= Buehlau =

Buehlau or Bühlau may refer to the following places in Saxony, Germany:

- Bühlau (Dresden), a quarter of Dresden
- Bühlau, a quarter of Großharthau in the district of Bautzen
