= Rudolf Dittrich (tenor) =

German opera singer

Rudolf Dittrich (12 February 1903 – 1990) was a German Kammersänger.

== Life ==
Dittrich was born in Prositz (today a district of Stauchitz) in the Kingdom of Saxony. Born into a farming family in the Riesa area and raised with hard farm work in Coschütz near Dresden, Dittrich is said to have shown his musical talent at an early age. In 1916, already at the age of 13, he entered the Gymnasium Dresden-Plauen at the behest of his father. In 1923, he successfully passed his examination and found employment in the school service. The training school, praised for its musical character as well as visits to the Dresden Semperoper, especially the performances of Smetana's The Bartered Bride with Richard Tauber, reinforced his desire to sing, which is why he tested his voice with the help of Czech baritone Hans Pokorny.

On New Year's Eve 1928, he auditioned for the Heldentenor of the Dresden State Opera, Kurt Taucher (i.e. Curt Taucher). Visibly impressed, the latter arranged an audition with Generalmusikdirektor Fritz Busch. He had prepared the cavatina from Gounod's Faust. Busch, who was already in tails because he was about to perform the "Palm Sunday Ninth" (Note: in the traditional manner, is not referring to the Palm Sunday cantata Himmelskönig, sei willkommen by J. S. Bach, but to Beethoven's Symphony No. 9. Since court conductor Richard Wagner helped the then still controversial work to a resounding success on Palm Sunday in 1846, the repetition of the event became a Dresden tradition. See klassik-heute.com and newsropa.de conducting should) (in which Dittrich himself would later be responsible for the tenor role), quickly put a stop to it, because the first notes already convinced him, he merely had his impression confirmed by intoning the High C.

In the middle of the 1928/29 season, namely in March 1929, the Quereinsteiger entered the opera business, despite the fact that his salary was not paid until 1 April. The pedagogue working in a closed classroom thus became, via the intermediate station of lyric tenor, a heroic tenor on the wide stage of the Dresden State Opera, which was equipped with a theatre ensemble of world reputation, consisting of Marta Fuchs, Friedrich Plaschke, Ivar Andresen, Kurt Böhme, Paul Schöffler, Max Lorenz, Erna Berger and now Rudolf Dittrich. He began with small parts such as the First Prisoner in Fidelio (1929) and came across Max in Der Freischütz (1930) and Don José in Carmen to the great parts of the youthful heroic fach. Later he was entrusted with the great parts of Wagner's operas, so at Easter time 1932 for the first time Parsifal. Contemporary operas were as close to his heart as the immortal classics. He sang in Machinist Hopkins, in Münchhausen and in 1940 in Sutermeister's Romeo and Juliet alongside Maria Cebotari and directed by Karl Böhm. Despite everything, his favourite piece remained the tenor solo in Beethoven's Symphony No. 9. He often performed it outside Dresden under famous conductors such as Furtwängler, Knappertsbusch, Clemens Krauss and Willem Mengelberg. He already experienced a special ennoblement in the inaugural year 1929 by Richard Strauss, who had chosen him for his performances of his own works Salome and Die ägyptische Helena. Dittrich gave guest performances in Berlin, Hamburg, Vienna, Munich, Barcelona and Geneva, to name only the most famous opera cities.

In the 1940s, an overdose of a drug led to damage to his vocal cords, as a result of which he had to slowly take his leave of the opera stage. (Note: The course of the disease was probably progressive, as indicated by the many different dates. (For exact sources, see individual references.) Die Union wrote on 2 April 1954: In 1942 a tragic accident took away the voice's precious peculiarity. The Sächsische Neueste Nachrichten on 19 April 1964: Towards the end of the last war, an accident put a sudden end to his singing career, which had been at its peak. The Sächsische Tageblatt on 11 February 1983: After 1945 [...] (had) to cut short this brilliant career prematurely through the misfortune of a drug overdose [...]. Der Morgen on the same day: [...] belonged to the forces of the first hour for several years after 1945, until his brilliant career was destroyed by a wrong drug treatment. And Horst Seeger in the Opern-Lexikon (Henschelverlag, Berlin 1978): [...] had to retire in 1950 as a result of a vocal cord burn [...].) In 1948, he only sang Narraboth in the Salome performance in the makeshift Kulturscheune Bühlau and Tamino in the first Mozart production in the newly created Kleines Haus. By then his repertoire totalled 76 roles. Generalintendant Martin Hellberg appointed the incapacitated opera star as performance master, voice teacher and opera consultant in 1949, he owes his specialisation in promoting young talent from 1954 onwards to general music director Franz Konwitschny and opera director Alfred Eichhorn. In the mid-1950s he also became Répétiteur. (Note: The exact year is given differently by the same newspaper (Die Union, see individual references): 1955 or 1957.)

His loyalty to his hometown was also expressed in the fact that instead of following appointments to Vienna or Munich he preferred to co-found the workers' opera Sachsenwerk Dresden-Niedersedlitz and served as its advisor. In his old age, the man appointed honorary member of the Dresden State Opera in 1967 never missed a premiere, and if he had anything to criticise or suggest beyond mere interest, he always found grateful open ears.

Grateful for their good education were Theo Adam (his pupil from 1946 to 1949), with whom he subsequently formed a friendship, Gerhard Stolze, Gisela Schröter, Marianne Fischer-Kupfer, Hajo Müller, Wilfried Krug, Nelly Ailakowa and many others. The city of Dresden also proved grateful once again shortly after his death when a street was named after him in the district of Nickern.

Dittrich died in Buehlau, Dresden and found his final resting place at the Bühlauer Friedhof.
