= Schönfeld Upland =

Plateau in Dresden, Germany

Coordinates: 51°02′30″N 13°53′45″E

The Schönfeld Upland (German: Schönfelder Hochland) is a plateau in Dresden. It is named after Schönfeld, the district of Dresden in the middle of the plateau. Up to 1950, when Pillnitz was incorporated into Dresden, the upland was known as the Pillnitzer Elbe Plateau.

== Location ==
The Schönfeld Upland is in the east of the Saxon capital of Dresden. It extends over an area of approximately 45 square kilometres to the edges of neighbouring Dürröhsdorf-Dittersbach in the rural district of Sächsische Schweiz-Osterzgebirge.

Places in the Schönfeld Upland include Borsberg, Cunnersdorf, Eichbusch, Eschdorf, Gönnsdorf, Helfenberg, Krieschendorf, Malschendorf, Pappritz, Reitzendorf, Rockau, Rosinendörfchen, Rossendorf, Schönfeld, Schullwitz, Weißig and Zaschendorf. The Dresden districts of Rochwitz, Oberwachwitz (where the Dresden TV Tower is located) and Bühlau are also part of the landscape of the Schönfelder Upland.

The Schönfeld Upland is part of the West Lusatian Highlands, making it part of the foothills of the Sudetes. It is over 250 metres above sea level on the Lusatian Plateau. The highest points in the Schönfeld Upland are the Triebenberg, the highest mountain in Dresden, and the Borsberg in the south of the upland, at 383 and 361 metres above sea level, respectively, followed by the 344-metre-high (1,129 ft) Napoleonstein ("Napoleon Rock") between Weißig and Rossendorf.

In the south and southwest the upland is bordered by the Dresden Elbe valley, running along the Lusatian fault, where the elevation steeply falls 200 metres to the Dresden Elbe valley. In the Northwest near Weißig, the Schönfeld Upland transitions into the Dresden Heath. The northeast border is marked by the flat, grassy hollow on the upper reaches of the Prießnitz. The upland's northeastern neighbour is the Harthe, the forested area including the Dresden-Rossendorf Research Centre. The transitions to the east and southeast are fluid—here the ground level leisurely drops towards the Wesenitz.

== Landscape ==
Typical of the upland are gently rolling to hilly areas, featuring a fragmented and variable structure with long ridges, low crests and shallow valleys. In the southwestern periphery, deep, narrow valleys cut into the plateau, where steep streams flow to the Elbe. These valleys are, from northwest to southeast the Wachwitzgrund near Wachwitz, the Helfenberger Grund and Preßgrund near Niederpoyritz, the Keppgrund near Hosterwitz, the Vogelgrund and the Friedrichsgrund near Pillnitz and the Tiefe Grund between Oberpoyritz and Graupa. The most important water course draining the upland to the east is the Schullwitzbach.

The broad fields and meadows are punctuated by villages but forested areas are absent. Despite belonging to the city of Dresden, the Schönfeld Upland is still dominated by agriculture. There are approximately 2600 hectares of arable land in the upland. In the GDR, various LPGs farmed the area. Today, it is mostly farmed by the Agrarproduktionsgesellschaft ('Agricultural Production Company') Schönfelder Hochland. Continuing the farming tradition is, among others, the smallholding museum Reizendorf.

== Protection ==
Together with the Dresden Elbe valley, parts of the Schönfeld Upland have formed a contiguous protected area since 4 July 1974.

== Trivia ==
The local transport company Hochlandexpress, located in Weißig, and the Hochlandverlag (publishing house) in Pappritz are both named after the Schönfeld Upland. The former Dürrörsdorf-Weißig railway line was also known as the Upland Railway and, today, has been converted into a popular bike path. The Hochlandfest ("Upland Festival") takes place every year and, every month the Hochland-Kurier ("Upland Courier") is published.
