= Bühlau (Dresden) =

Coordinates: 51°03′40″N 13°50′55″E

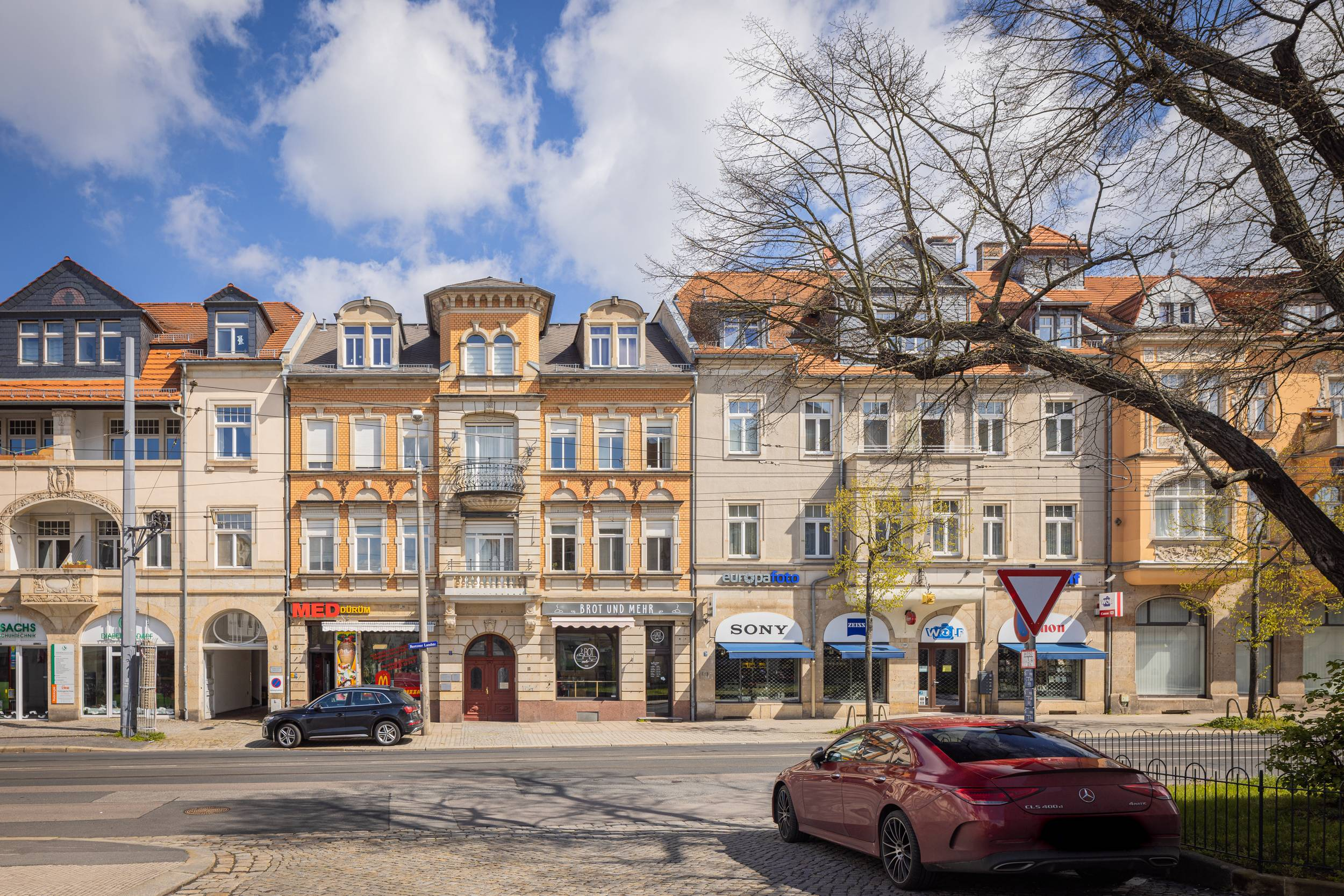
Bautzner Landstraße in Bühlau

Bühlau (German pronunciation: [ˈbyːlaʊ]) is a quarter in the east of the Saxon capital Dresden and belongs to the statistical quarter Bühlau/Weißer Hirsch. It lies in the outside of the Elbe valley between the Dresden Heath and the Schoenfeld Upland. It was first mentioned in 1349, in 1839 it formed a country commune together with Quohren and in 1921 it became incorporated into Dresden. Today, Buehlau is part of one of the Dresden villa quarters.

== Geography ==
Buehlau is located seven kilometres to the east of Dresden's city centre, the Inner Old Town (Innere Altstadt). It lies an average altitude of about 240 metres above sea level, although the terrain is very bumpy. The lowest point of Buehlau is located at the Loschwitzgrund (lit. Loschwitz Ground) at abundant 200 metres above sea level. In the southeast of the municipal area, the land rises to more than 300 metres above sea level at the Schoenfeld Upland. In the north, Buehlau matches up to the edge of the Dresden Heath, where the Buehlau wood gardens (Bühlauer Waldgärten) are. In the west it is bordered along the Nachtfluegelweg (lit. Night Wings Way) to the Weisser Hirsch (lit. White Deer) and amounting to Neugersdorfer Strasse (lit. Neugersdorf Street) to Oberloschwitz. In the southwest it borders to Rochwitz. South of the municipal area lies Goennsdorf (Gönnsdorf); which is part of the district Schoenfeld-Weissig (Schönfeld-Weißig); in the east of Buehlau it borders at Weissig (Weißig). Together with the Weisser Hirsch, Rochwitz, and parts of Loschwitz, Bühlau forms the statistical district Buehlau/Weisser Hirsch, which belongs to the borough of Loschwitz.

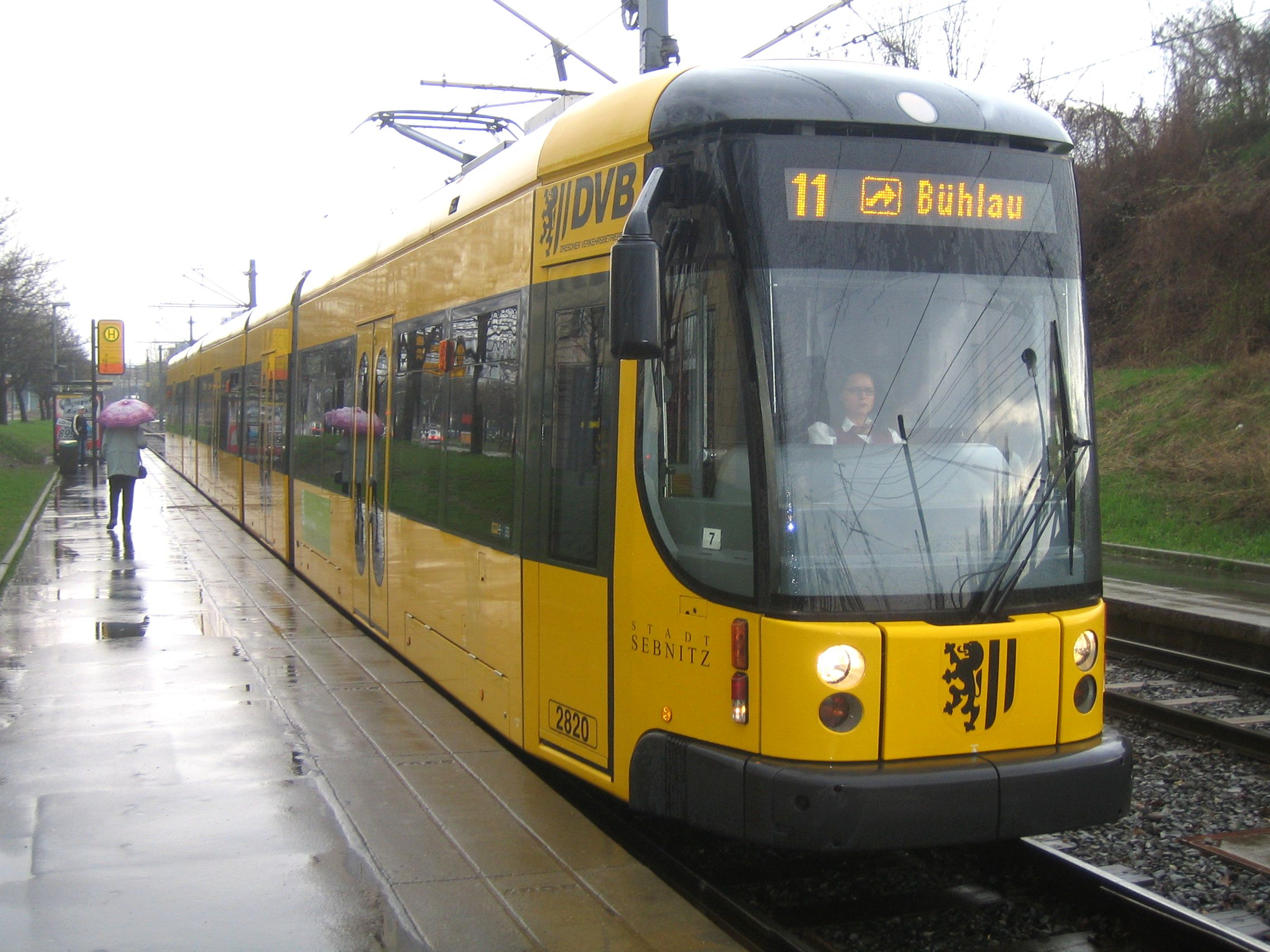
A tram of line 11 onto Buehlau

Bühlau's municipal area is divided into multiple parts. In the southeast is the former quarter Quohren. In the centre, at the Ullersdorfer Platz/Quohrener Strasse (lit. Ullersdorf Place/Quohren Street) is the village core located in a shallow hollow, the old Oberdorf (altes Oberdorf). With the neighbouring village of Quohren, it enjoys a common protection status because of the still existing ancient village buildings in the "preservation statute for historic village centres in the city of Dresden." The residential area (villa quarter) of New Buehlau (Neubühlau) is located in the north and west.

The most important street of the quarter is the Bautzner Landstrasse (lit. Bautzen Land Street), which runs as Bundesstrasse 6 (lit. State Street 6) in east–west direction through Bühlau unto the Mordgrundbruecke (lit. Murder Ground Bridge), where it is called then called Bautzner Strasse (lit. Bautzen Street). It is served by the tram line 11. On the Ullersdorfer Platz, the Ullersdorfer Landstrasse (lit. Ullersdorf Land Street) branches off (Staatsstraße 181) off in the direction of Radeberg. A more major road link is the basic Road downhill leading miracle as Staatsstrasse 167 (lit. State Street 167) through the Loschwitzgrund to Loschwitz to the Blue Wonder (Blaues Wunder). Several bus routes, including the 61 and 84 of the DVB, as well as several lines of Müller Busreisen and the RVD head for Bühlau.

== History ==
=== Population development ===
year	population
1552	16 besessene Mann, 9 Inwohner
1764	19 besessene Mann, 1 gardener, 31 Haeusler
1834	587
1871	880
1890	1715
1910	3541
1925	4949

== Bibliography ==
- Roland Lorenz: Stadtteilgeschichten Bühlau, Hochland-Verlag Pappritz, ISBN 3-934047-24-6
- Roland Lorenz: Begegnungen mit Bühlau, Hochland-Verlag Pappritz, ISBN 3-934047-41-6.
- Roland Lorenz: Impressionen von Bühlau, Hochland-Verlag Pappritz, ISBN 3-934047-30-0.
- Folke Stimmel, Reinhardt Eigenwill et al.: Stadtlexikon Dresden, Verlag der Kunst, Dresden 1994.
