= Johannstadt Neustadt Ferry =

Ferry on the Elbe River in Germany

Coordinates: 51.062301°N 13.766137°E

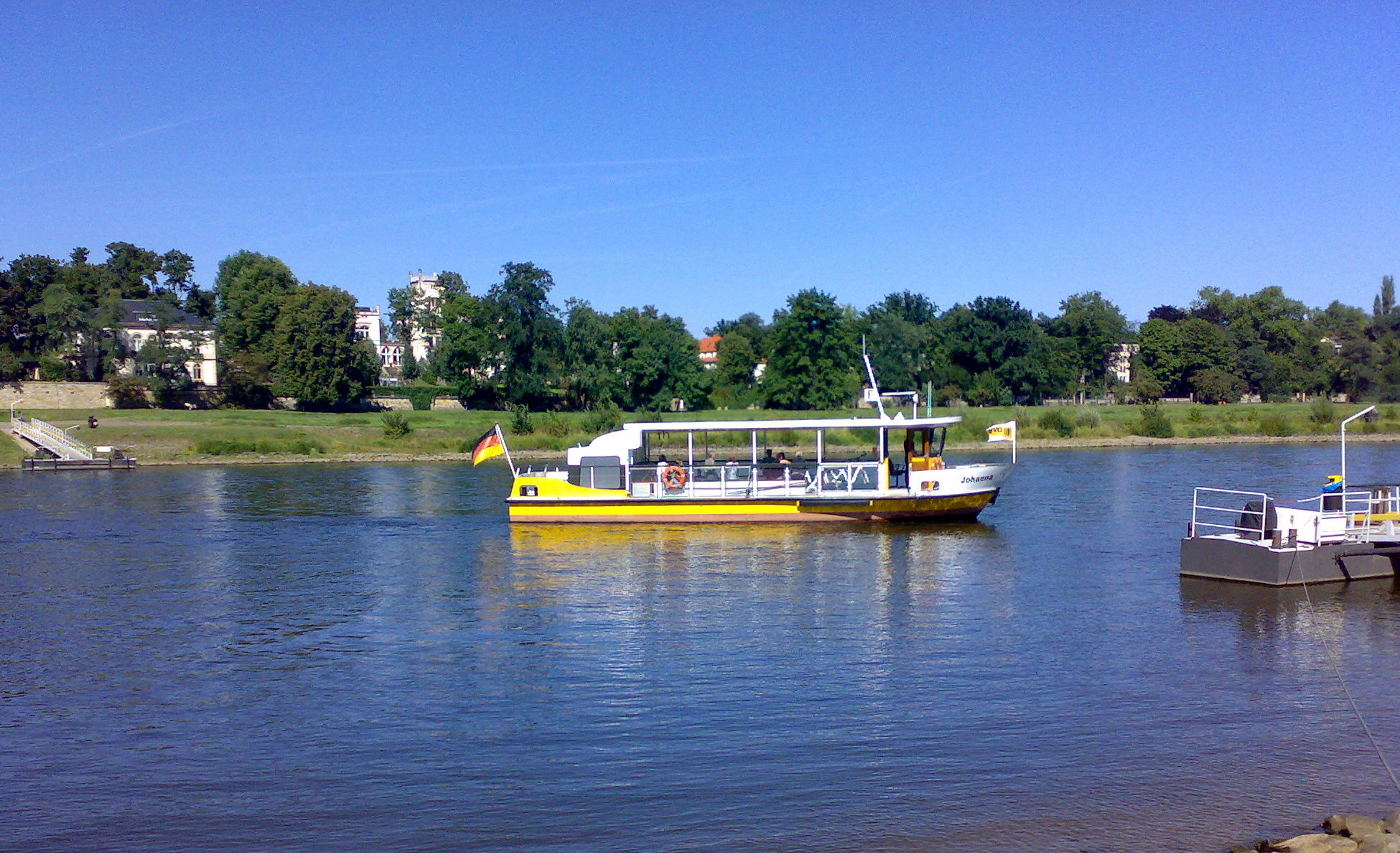
Ferry boat Johanna on the ferry

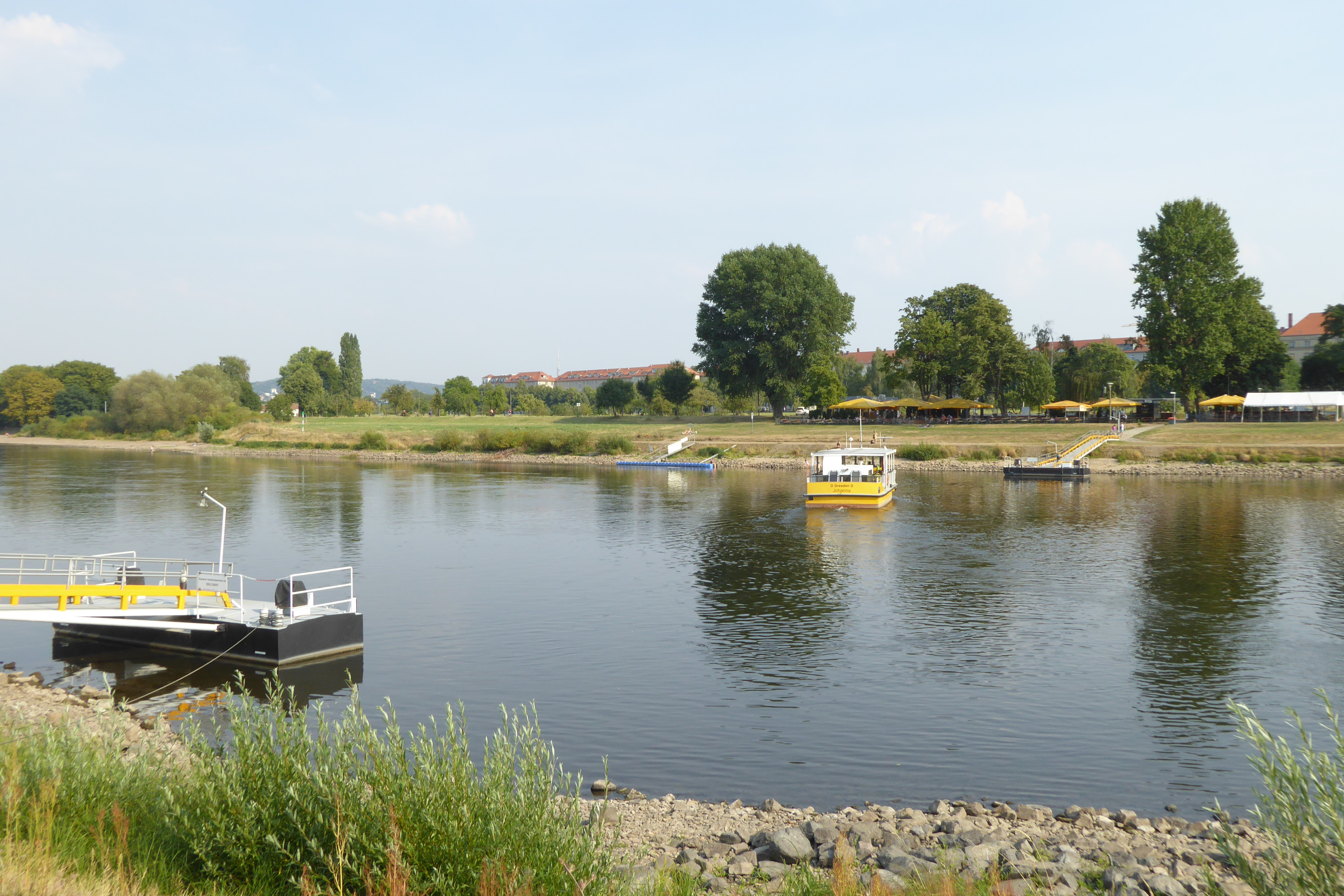
The Johannstadt Neustadt ferry route

The Johannstadt Neustadt Ferry is a passenger ferry across the Elbe river in Germany. It crosses between the districts of Johannstadt and Neustadt in the city of Dresden.

The ferry service is operated by the Dresdner Verkehrsbetriebe (DVB), Dresden's municipal transport authority, running every 10 to 15 minutes throughout the day. The service is normally maintained by the Johanna, one of the DVB's fleet of five ferries, but other vessels may substitute if necessary. The Johanna can carry up to 75 passengers and is painted in the DVB's yellow and white livery.
