= Trams in Dresden =

Tram network in Saxony, Germany

Coordinates: 51°03′03″N 13°44′00″E

Dresden tramway network
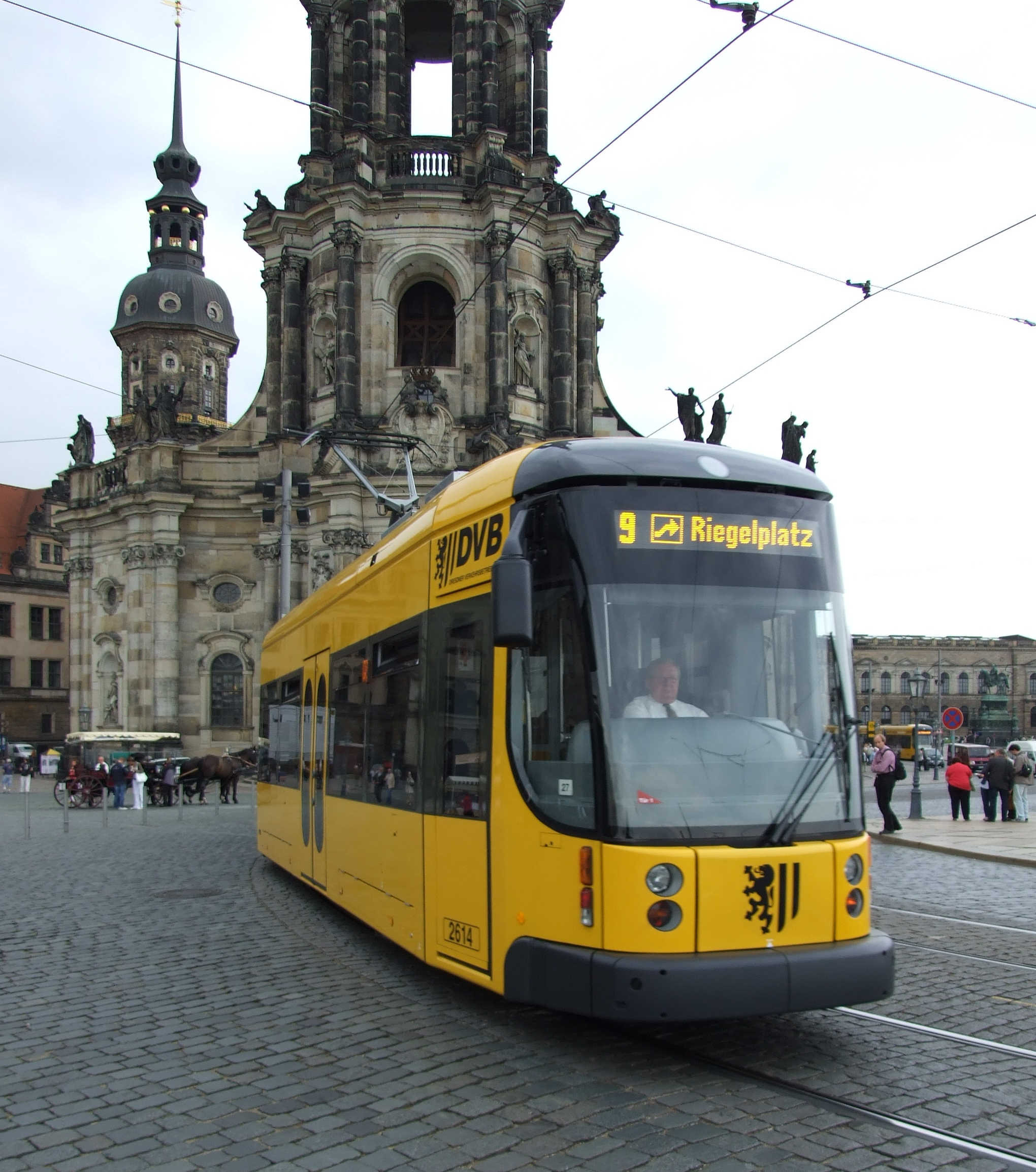
- A tram in front of the Dresden Cathedral, 2008

Operation
- Locale: Dresden, Saxony, Germany

Statistics
Horsecar era: 1872–ca. 1900
- Status: Converted to electricity
- Track gauge: 1,450 mm (4 ft 9 3/32 in)
- Propulsion system: Horses
Electric tram era: since 1893
- Status: Operational
- Operators: Dresdner Verkehrsbetriebe (DVB); (since 1993)
- Track gauge: 1,450 mm (4 ft 9 3/32 in)
- Propulsion system: Electricity
- Electrification: 600 V DC
- Route length: 134.0 km (83.3 mi)
- Dresden tramway network, 2025
- Website: http://www.dvb.de/en/Homepage/ Dresdner Verkehrsbetriebe (in English)

The Dresden tramway network (German: Straßenbahnnetz Dresden) is a network of tramways forming the backbone of the public transport system in Dresden, a city in the federal state of Saxony, Germany. Opened in 1872, it has been operated since 1993 by Dresdner Verkehrsbetriebe (DVB), and is integrated in the Verkehrsverbund Oberelbe (VVO).

As of 2008, the network comprised 12 tram lines, with a total line length of approximately 210 kilometres (130 mi) and a total route length of 132.7 kilometres (82.5 mi). There was 291.6 kilometres (181.2 mi) of track, which translated into 132.7 kilometres (82.5 mi) of actual tram line, serving 154 tram stops.

== History ==
1872-1906

The origins of the Dresden tramway network can be traced back to the year 1872, when the first horse-drawn line opened between the city centre and the former village of Blasewitz, now a borough of Dresden. London based entrepreneur Arnold von Etlinger acquired the licence to build and operate the line that remained the only tram line in Dresden until 1880. In that year, British entrepreneur Alfred Parrish successfully negotiated with the city of Dresden for the concession to expand the city's tram network. In the following years, his enterprise 'Tramway Company of Germany Limited' build several new tram lines. A competing tram line company was founded in 1889. The 'Deutsche Straßenbahngesellschaft in Dresden' (German Tramline Company in Dresden) opened its first line in 1892. Dresden's first electric tram line from Blasewitz to Laubegast was opened in 1893. Between 1893 and 1900, all of the horse-tram lines were substituted for electric ones. By 1906, both tram companies had been bought by the city of Dresden to be merged into the 'Städtische Straßenbahnen zu Dresden'. At the highpoint of their usage, up to 1455 horses were used at the same time as part of the cities horsetram network.

== Lines ==
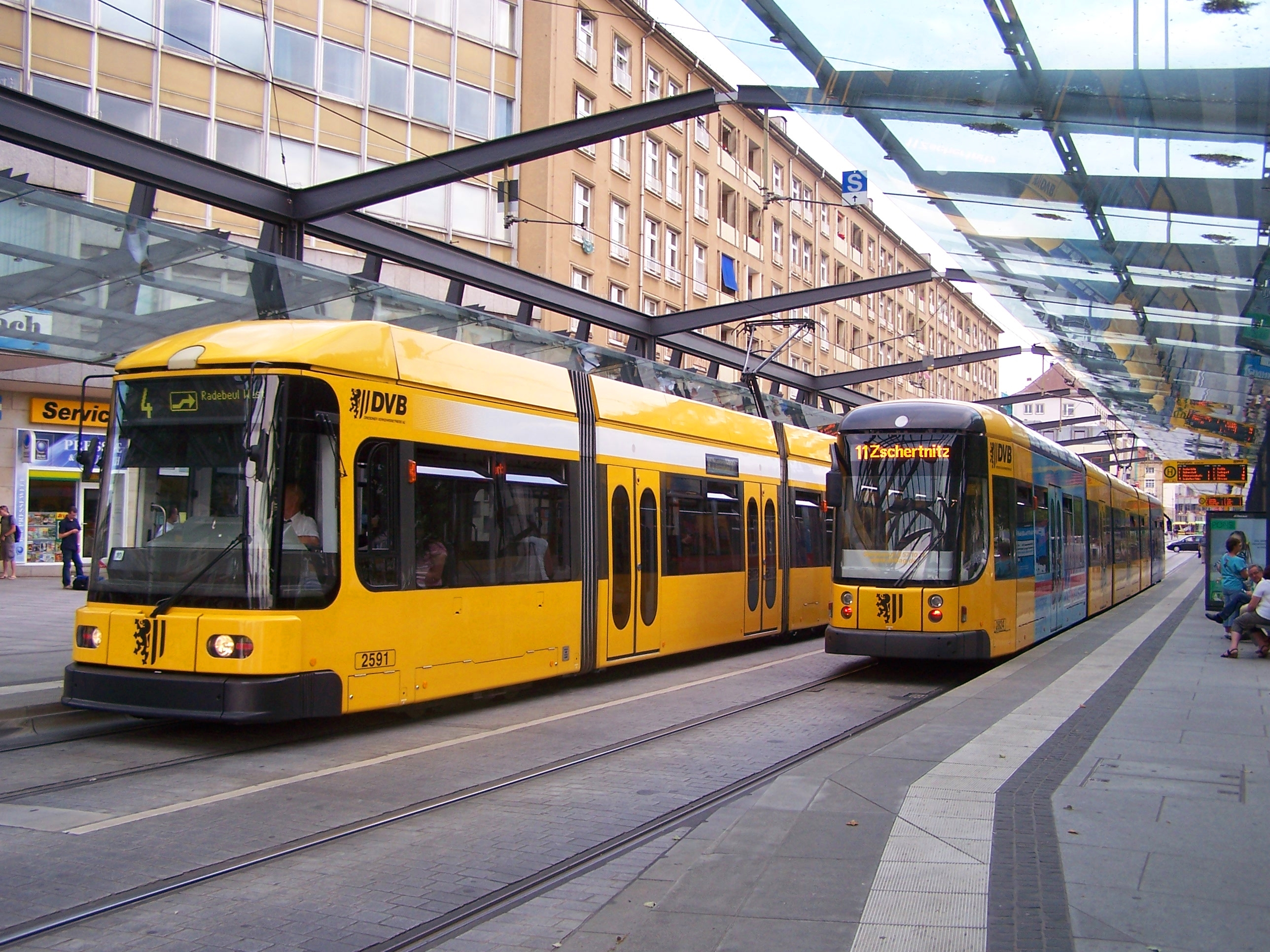
Dresden trams at Postplatz, 2008

The Dresden tramway network is a mixed system of traditional street running, especially in the inner city boroughs close to the city centre, and modern light rail. The network uses the unique gauge of 1,450 mm (4 ft 9 3/32 in), which is just 15 mm or 19/32 inch wider than 1,435 mm (4 ft 8 1/2 in) standard gauge. This gauge is sometimes called the Dresden Gauge.

In recent years, street running has been replaced by independent right-of-way arrangements wherever possible, and new extensions created in the same form. In November 2008, a 2.8-kilometre (1.7 mi) extension of line 7 was opened from Gorbitz to Pennrich, in Dresden's south eastern suburbs. In May 2011, a 1.6-kilometre (0.99 mi) extension of line 10 opened from Friedrichstrasse to the city's Messe or exhibition centre, involving construction of a 315-metre (1,033 ft 6 in) long, 15-metre (49 ft 3 in) wide and 5.4-metre (17 ft 9 in) high bridge across the floodplain of the River Elbe. In July 2019, routes 9 and 13 were realigned along a 1.1-kilometre (0.68 mi) section to provide better connections with regional trains at Dresden-Strehlen station.

Unlike various other German cities of comparable size, no stadtbahn style tunnel sections or high platform stops have been created. Many tram stops have been rebuilt so as to be fully accessible to physically disabled persons, and to allow level boarding to the newer low floor trams that now operate most services.

Different lines can be identified by a line number and a colour code. As of 2017 the lines are:

Line	Route	Length	Time	Stops
1	Prohlis – Gruna – Straßburger Platz – Postplatz – Bahnhof Mitte – Friedrichstadt – Leutewitz	15.4 kilometres (9.6 mi)	47 min	34
2	Kleinzschachwitz – Gruna – Straßburger Platz – Postplatz – Bahnhof Mitte – Cotta – Gorbitz	18.2 kilometres (11.3 mi)	55 min	38
3	Coschütz – Plauen – Hauptbahnhof – Pirnaischer Platz – Albertplatz – Bahnhof Neustadt – Trachenberge – Wilder Mann	11.9 kilometres (7.4 mi)	38 min	25
4	Laubegast – Striesen – Straßburger Platz – Postplatz – Mickten – Radebeul – Coswig – Weinböhla	28.9 kilometres (18.0 mi)	79 min	56/57
6	Niedersedlitz – Blasewitz – Albertplatz – Bahnhof Neustadt – Bahnhof Mitte – Löbtau – Wölfnitz (– Gorbitz)	22.0 kilometres (13.7 mi)	67 min	44/45 (48/49)
7	Pennrich – Gorbitz – Löbtau – Hauptbahnhof – Pirnaischer Platz – Albertplatz – Klotzsche – Weixdorf	23.2 kilometres (14.4 mi)	63 min	43/44
8	Südvorstadt – Hauptbahnhof – Postplatz – Albertplatz – Hellerau	13.4 kilometres (8.3 mi)	40 min	27
9	Prohlis – Strehlen – Zoo – Hauptbahnhof – Postplatz – Mickten – Kaditz	17.0 kilometres (10.6 mi)	51 min	40
10	Striesen – Straßburger Platz – Hauptbahnhof – Bahnhof Mitte – Vorwerkstraße (Friedrichstadt) – Messe Dresden	11 kilometres (6.8 mi)	36 min	23
11	Zschertnitz – Hauptbahnhof – Postplatz – Bahnhof Neustadt – Albertplatz – Weißer Hirsch – Bühlau	15.9 kilometres (9.9 mi)	48 min	31
12	Striesen – Blasewitz – Straßburger Platz – Postplatz – Löbtau – Cotta – Leutewitz	14.5 kilometres (9.0 mi)	49 min	32/33
13	Prohlis – Strehlen – Zoo – Straßburger Platz – Neustadt – Pieschen – Mickten (– Kaditz)	14.7 kilometres (9.1 mi)	48 min	37 (43)
20	Messe Dresden – Maxstraße – Postplatz – Webergasse		12 min	

Future plans, as part of the Stadtbahnprogramm 2020, include 14.9 kilometres (9.3 mi) of new tram line, with work starting in 2014. Some 10.5 kilometres (6.5 mi) would be on reserved track, and the new lines would replace bus lines 61 and 62, some of the city's busiest, with an estimated cost of 223 million euros. The new lines comprise:

- Prager Str to Plauen Bhf via Budapester Str and Chemnitzer Str
- Großer Garten to Löbtau via Technische Universität
- City Center to Fetscherplatz via Pillnitzer Str and Striesener Str
- Sachsenallee to Max-Planck-Institute via Johannstadt
- Bühlau to Weißig

On all tram lines except lines 4 and 11, a general 10-minute headway is offered on weekdays, extending to 15 minutes on Saturday, Sunday and in the evening. On the main routes through the inner city, where different lines intertwine, vehicles run up to every two minutes. Line 4, which extends a considerable distance beyond the city boundary to the towns of Radebeul, Coswig and Weinböhla, operates the standard 10 or 15 minute interval service as far as Radebeul West, and a 30-minute service beyond that to Coswig and Weinböhla. Line 11 is running every 7 to 8 minutes during peak hours.

== Rolling stock ==
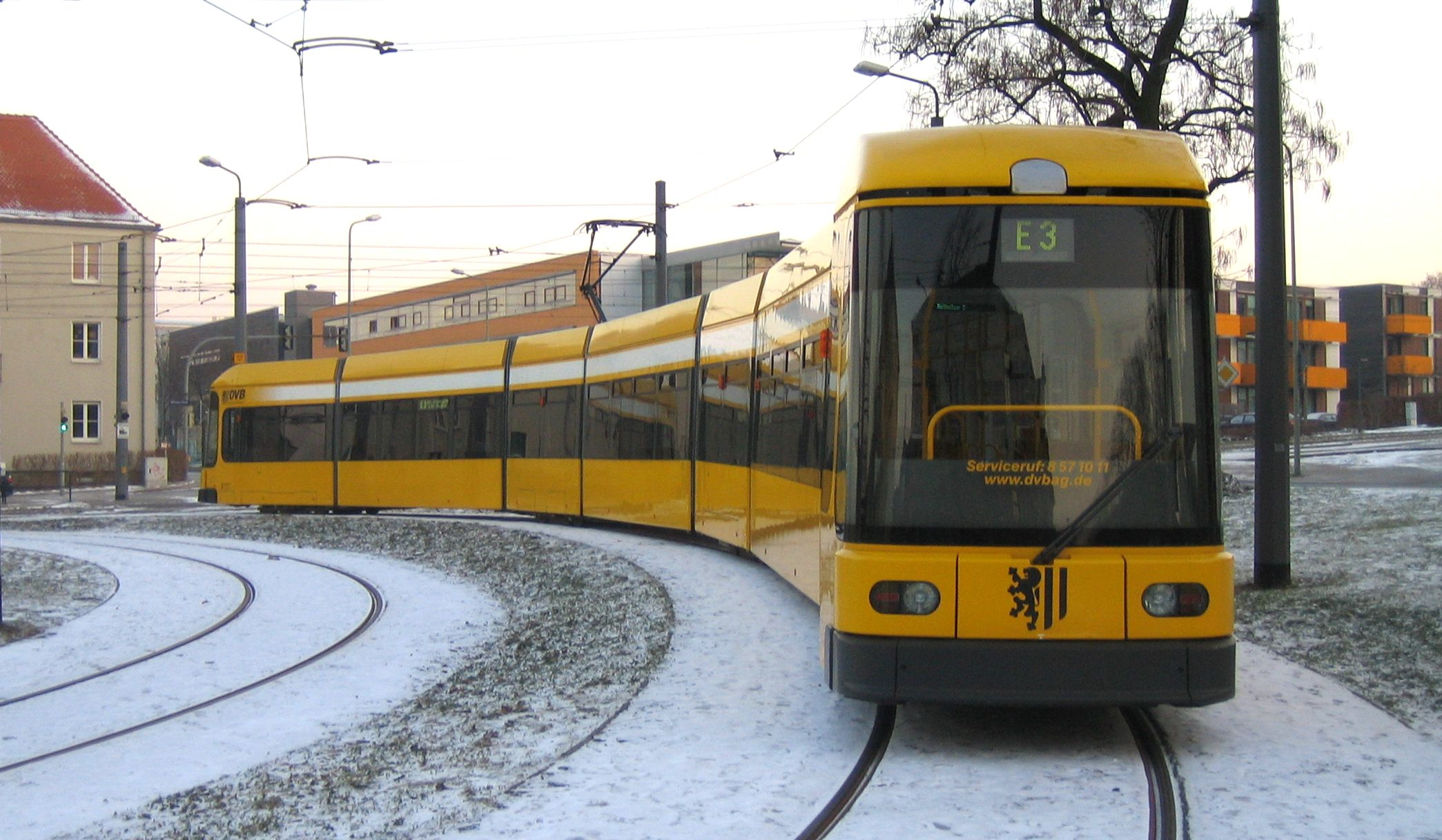
A Deutsche Waggonbau 8-axle car in the snow

As of 2023, Dresden's tram fleet is made up of 199 modern tramsets. All trams operating in Dresden are articulated low floor cars, of two different basic designs, each of which has several variants.

The first generation of low floor cars was built by Deutsche Waggonbau in Bautzen between 1995 and 2002; both 6 and 8 axle variants exist. The second generation of low floor cars have been built since 2003 are Bombardier Flexity Classics; 8, 10 and 12 axle variants exist. The articulated cars vary in length from 30 to 45 metres (98 ft 5 in to 147 ft 8 in) long; all run as single car sets.

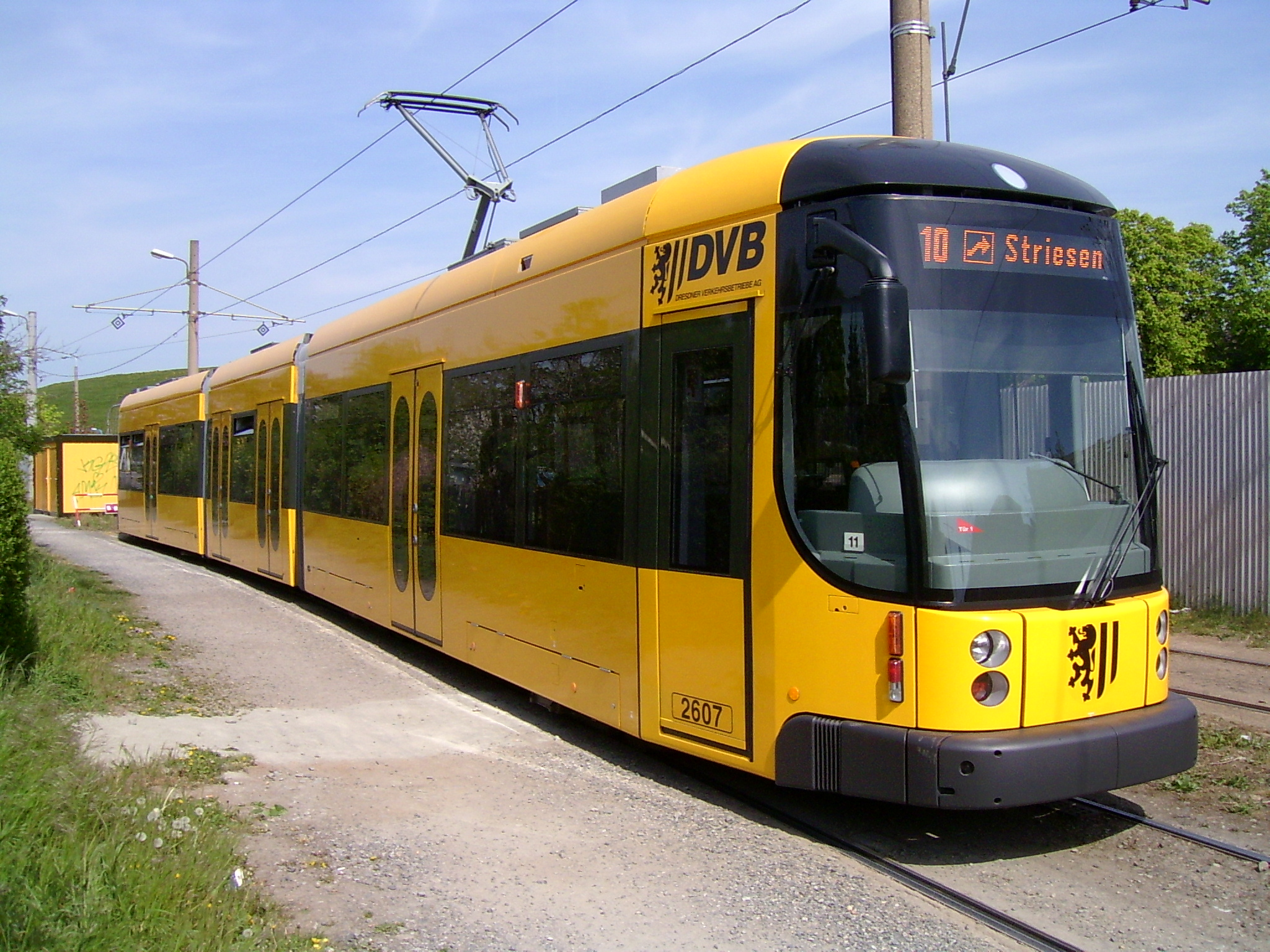
A Bombardier 8-axle car at the Friedrichstadt terminus

The fleet used to be composed of ČKD Tatra trams that provided service towards the end of the GDR era. In total, 572 T4D motor cars and 246 B4D trailers were delivered to Dresden from 1967 onwards, as well as 4 T6A2 motor cars and 2 B6A2 trailers, used from 1990. The last Tatra T4D cars were put out of service after a farewell ceremony on 3 June 2023. Two refurbished T4D-MT cars as well as one refurbished TB4D-MT trailer were handed over to the city's tram museum, in addition to two original T4D cars already exhibited there.

The DVB tram fleet operates out of three depots; at Gorbitz on routes 2,6 and 7 in south west Dresden, at Trachenberge on route 3 in the north-west, and Reick on routes 1, 9 and 13 in the south-east. Gorbitz is new facility opened in 1996 and includes a new central workshops. Trachenberge and Reick are older facilities that have both been heavily rebuilt to similar standards, whilst several other older depots have been closed. The former central workshops at Trachenberge, adjacent to the current depot, now house the Dresden Tram Museum, which has a collection including examples of many former Dresden trams.

== CarGoTram ==
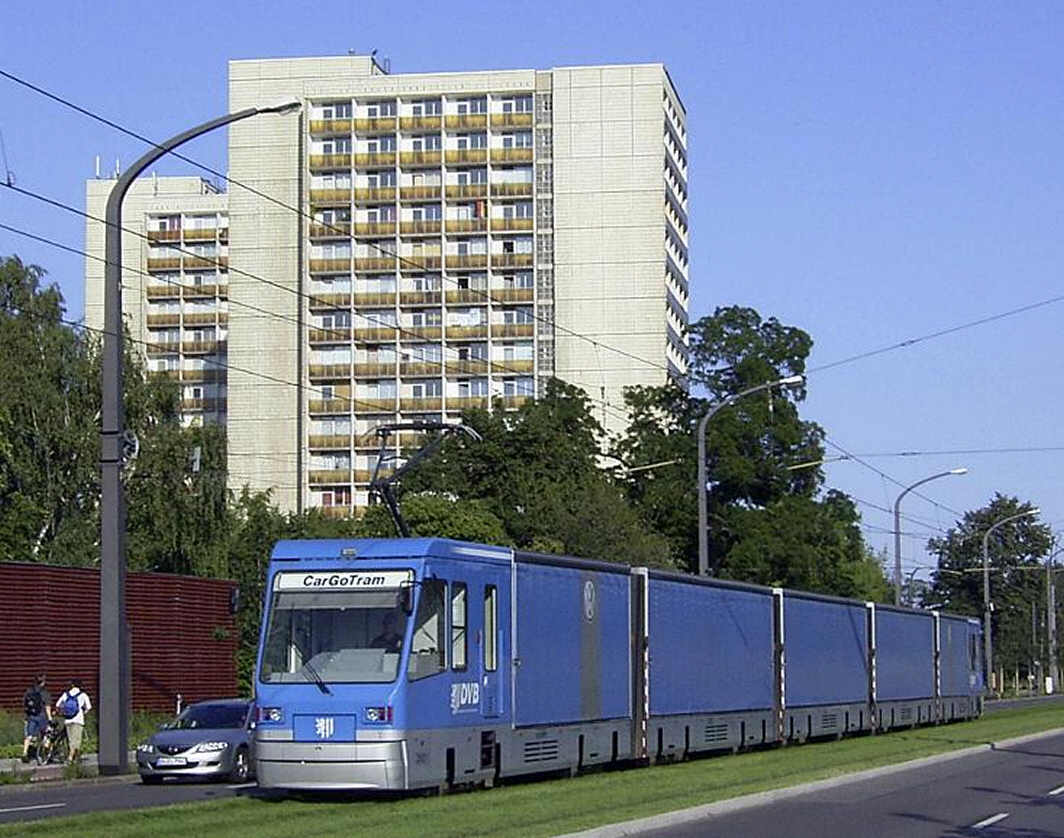
A CarGoTram on one of the grassed sections of track

The CarGoTram was a freight carrying tram that supplied Volkswagen's Transparent Factory, crossing the city. The two trams, up to 60 metres (200 ft) long, was the longest vehicles allowed to use roads in Dresden. The connection by tram was established to reduce the number of trucks used. The factory is located to the east of the city centre, next to the Großer Garten, whilst the distribution depot that loads the parts is to the west of the city centre.

== See also ==
- List of town tramway systems in Germany
- Trams in Germany
