= Carl Maria von Weber Museum =

Museum

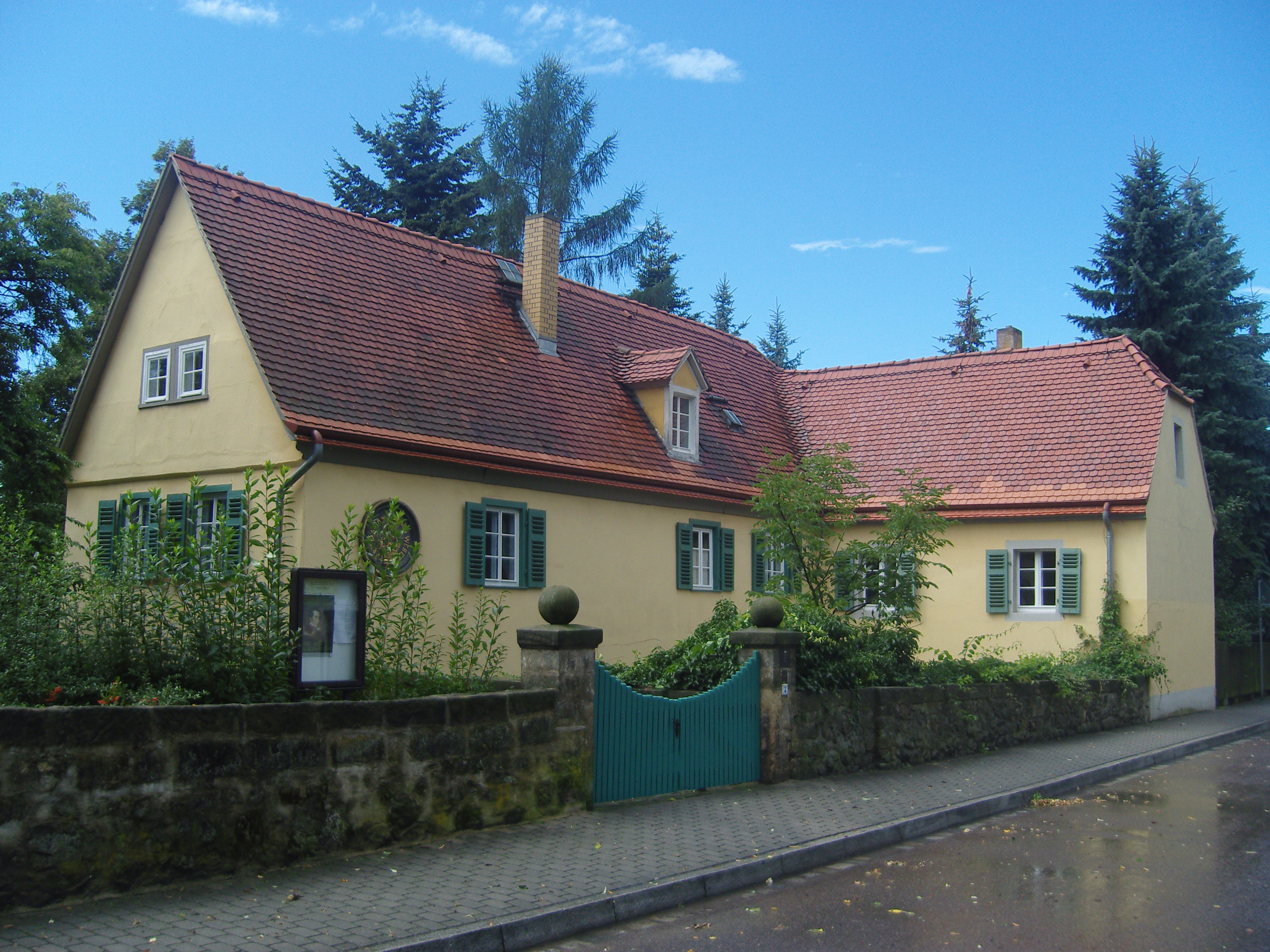
- Interactive map of Carl Maria von Weber Museum

General information
- Location: Dresdner Straße 44; 01326 Dresden, Hosterwitz, Germany
- Coordinates: 51°1′0.5″N 13°51′52.2″E

The Carl Maria von Weber Museum is a cultural site in Dresden, in Saxony, Germany. The composer Carl Maria von Weber (1786–1826) lived here during part of his career; the house is now a museum about his life and work.

== History ==
=== Weber in Hosterwitz ===
The building is the only home of the composer still in existence. It is in Hosterwitz, at that time a village, now part of Dresden, and was originally a vine-grower's house. It was rented by Weber from Gottfried Felsner; during the summer months from 1818 to 1819, and 1822 to 1824, the composer and his family lived here.

He regarded his times here as the happiest of his life; he liked to take walks in the Keppgrund, a rural area nearby. He received at the house guests including the composers Louis Spohr and Johann Nepomuk Hummel, and the soprano Wilhelmine Schröder-Devrient.

A room on the upper floor (now furnished in the fashion of his day) was Weber's composing room. He wrote here large parts of his operas Der Freischütz and Euryanthe, the outline of his opera Oberon, and Invitation to the Dance.

=== The museum ===
After the death of the composer's great-granddaughter Mathilde von Weber in 1956, who made her estate available, rooms of the building were opened to the public in 1957 with an exhibition. The building was renovated from 1973 to 1976. Since 1995 it has been a branch of the Dresden City Museum.

There are letters, music manuscripts, pictures and other items relating to Carl Maria von Weber, and furniture of the day. Concerts, lectures and other events are held here.
