= Pillnitz Kleinzschachwitz Ferry =

Ferry in Dresden, Germany

Coordinates: 51.010393°N 13.862933°E

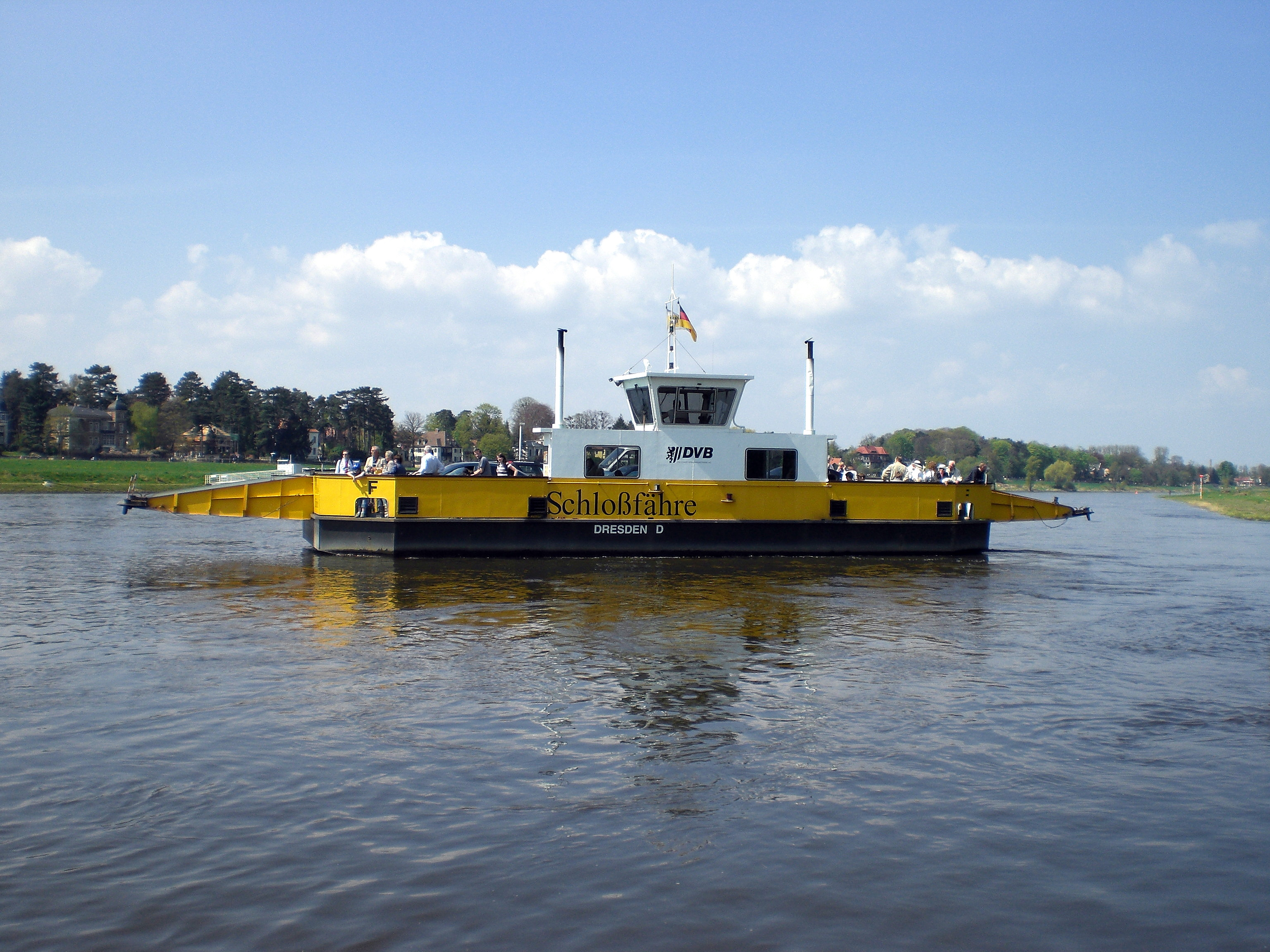
The ferry in mid-channel.

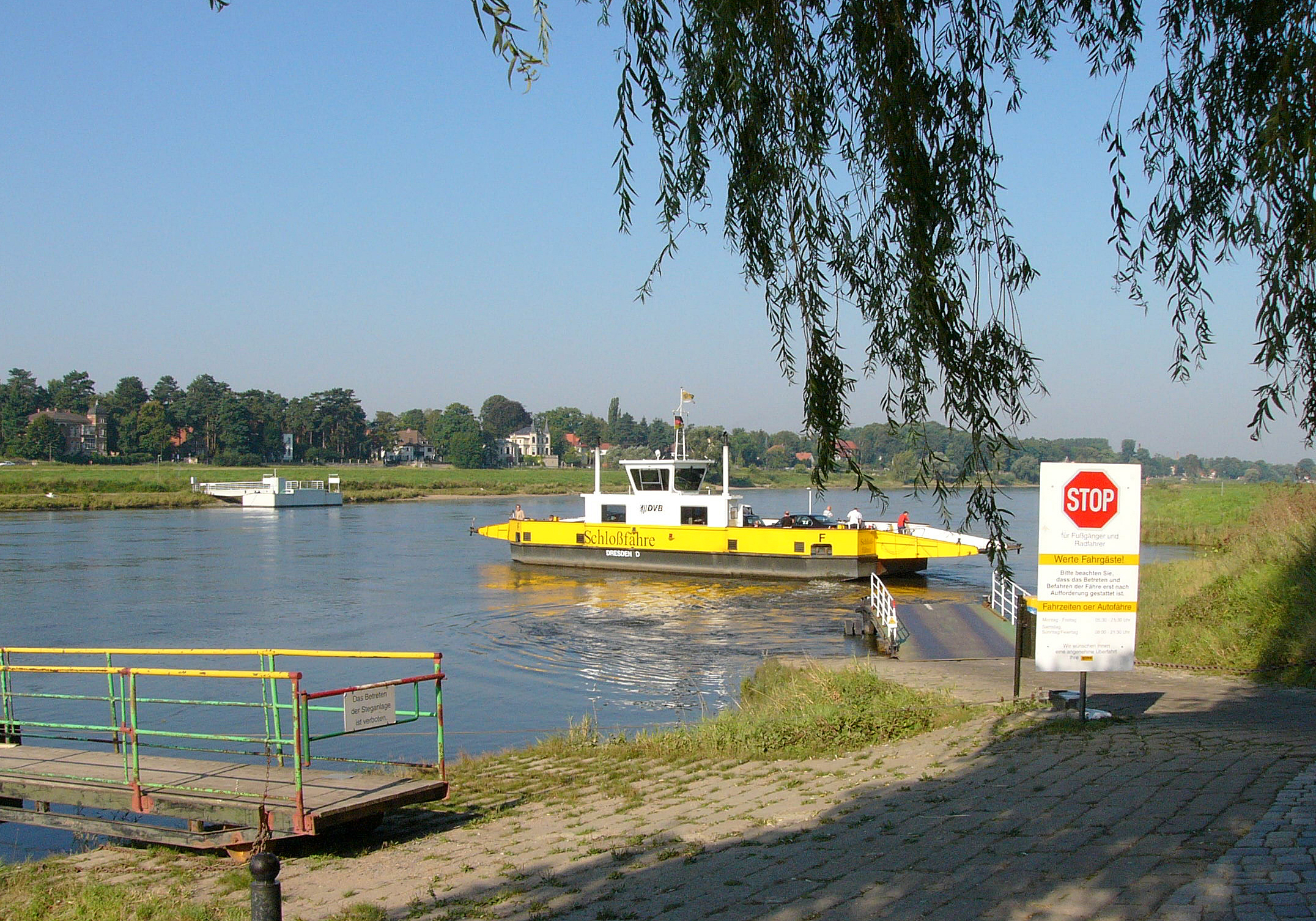
The ferry at the Pillnitz bank.

The Pillnitz Kleinzschachwitz Ferry, also known as the Schlossfähre, is a ferry across the Elbe river in Germany. It crosses between the districts of Pillnitz and Kleinzschachwitz in the city of Dresden, close to the former's collection of palaces that give the ferry its alternate name. It carries both passengers and cars.

The ferry service is operated by the Dresdner Verkehrsbetriebe (DVB), Dresden's municipal transport authority, and carries the number F14 in the Verkehrsverbund Oberelbe route numbering scheme. It operates every 15 minutes throughout the day. It is the only vehicle ferry operated by DVB, although they also operate a fleet of smaller passenger ferries.

The car used on the service is named Schloßfähre, is diesel powered, and is propelled using Schottel pump jets. It has a length of 29 metres (95 ft) and a width of 8.6 metres (28 ft). It can carry 140 passenger and 8 cars, or 350 passengers if no cars are carried. If necessary, vessels from the DVB's fleet of four passenger-only ferries may also be used on the crossing.

== See also ==
- Pillnitz Castle
- Pillnitz
