= Laubegast Niederpoyritz Ferry =

Passenger ferry in Germany

Coordinates: 51.031955°N 13.838589°E

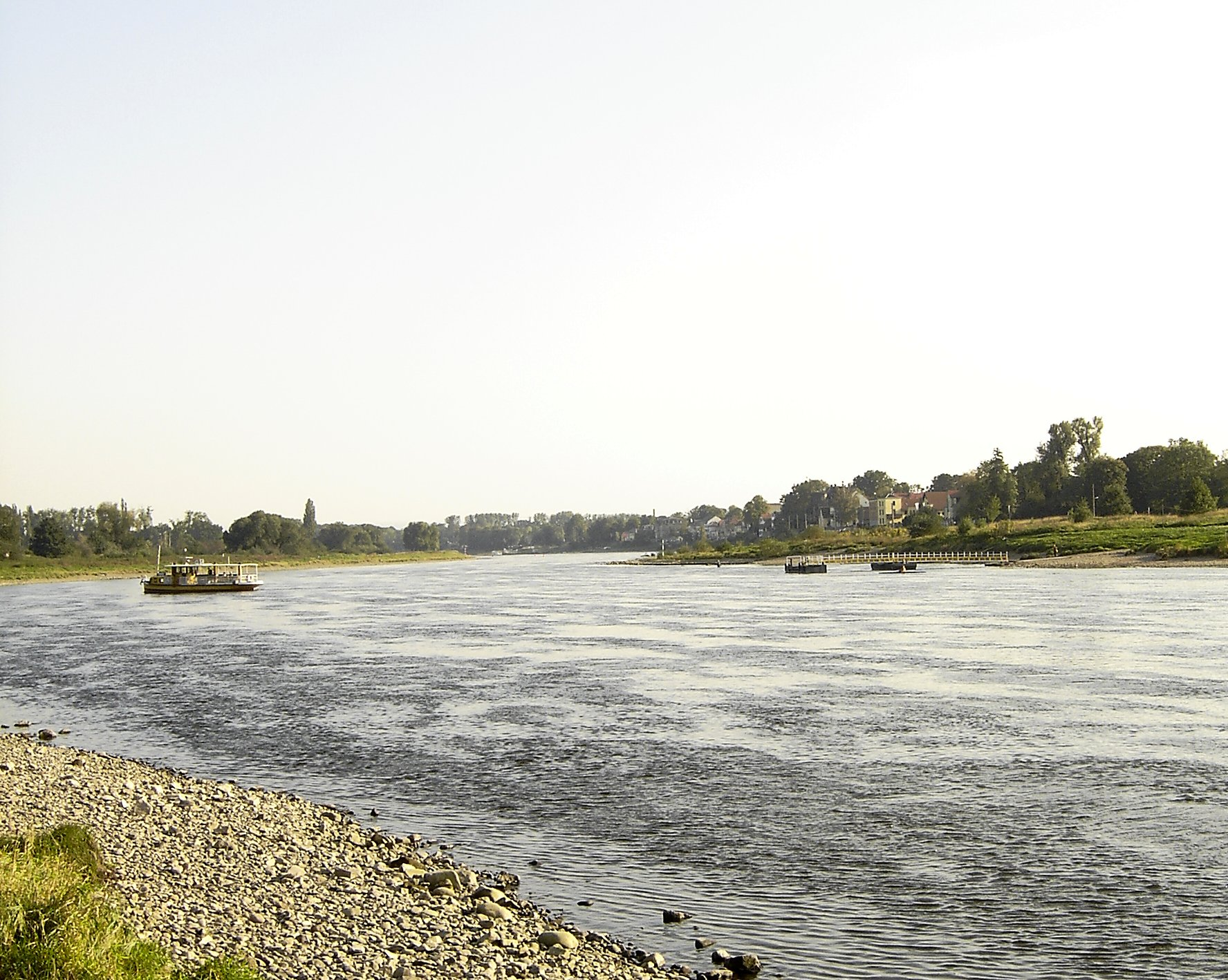
The Laubegast Niederpoyritz Ferry

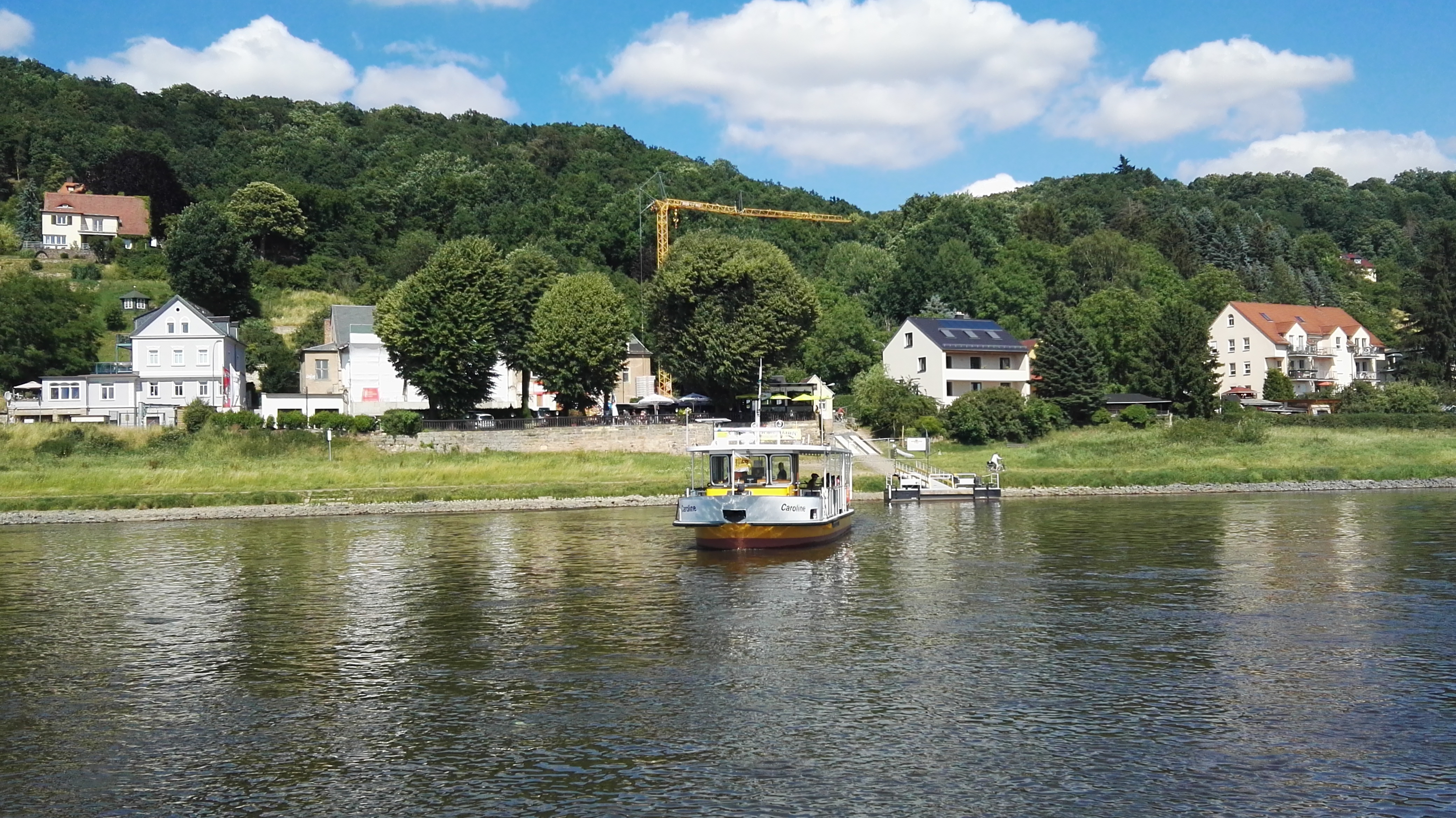
The Laubegast Niederpoyritz Ferry

The Laubegast Niederpoyritz Ferry is a passenger ferry across the Elbe river in Germany. It crosses between the districts of Laubegast and Niederpoyritz in the city of Dresden.

The ferry service is operated by the Dresdner Verkehrsbetriebe (DVB), Dresden's municipal transport authority, running every 10 to 15 minutes throughout the day. The service is normally maintained by Caroline, one of the DVB's fleet of five passenger ferries, but other vessels may substitute if necessary. The Caroline can carry up to 75 passengers and is painted in the DVB's yellow and white livery.
