= Keppgrund =

Coordinates: 51°1′21.0″N 13°52′18.5″E

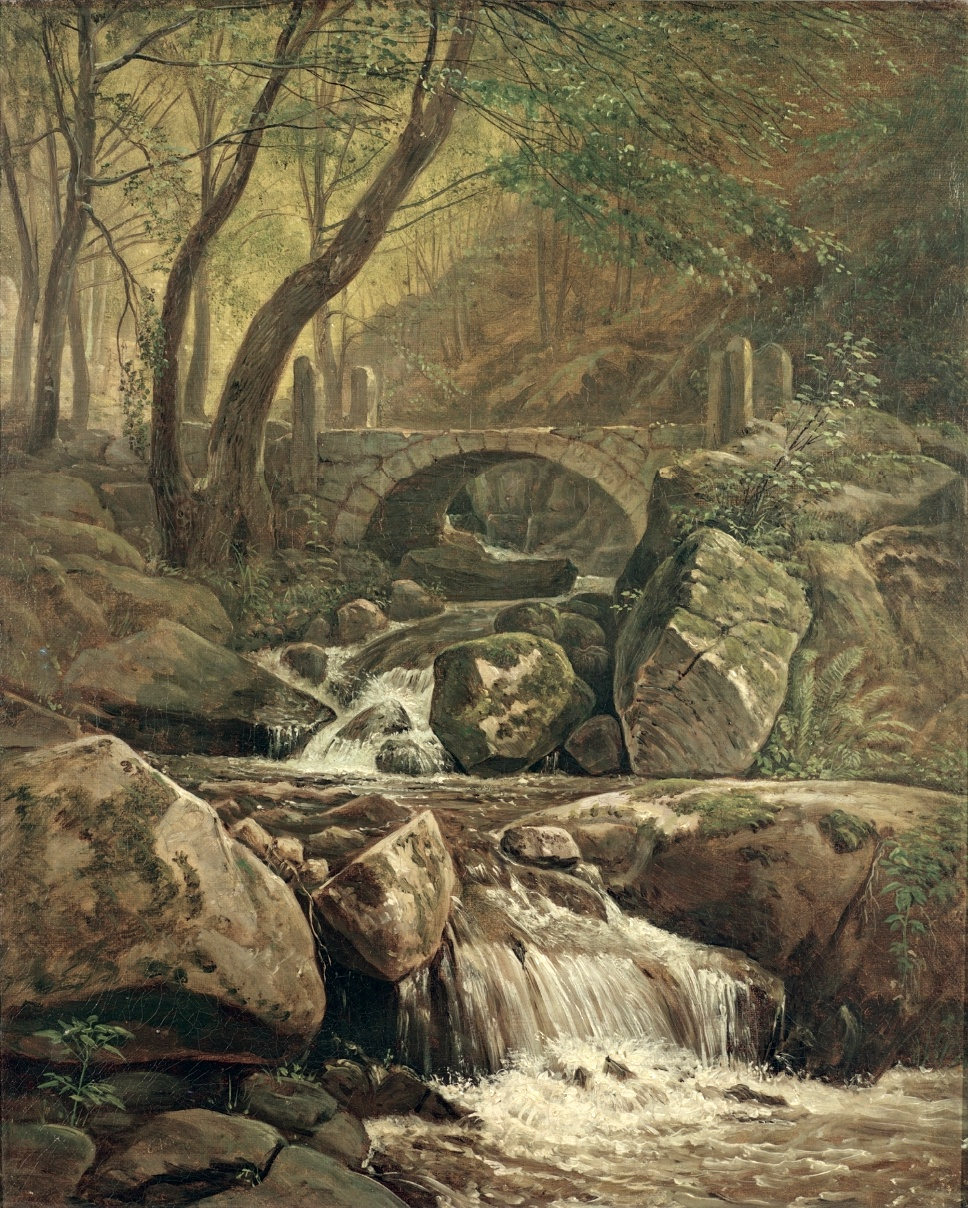
The Keppgrund near Hosterwitz, painting by Carl Gustav Carus c. 1850

The Keppgrund is a wooded side valley of the River Elbe between Loschwitz and Pillnitz, near Dresden in Saxony, Germany. It is part of the conservation area Elbhänge Dresden – Pirna. The Keppbach, a brook rising in the Schönfeld Upland and about 5 kilometres (3.1 mi) long, flows through the valley into the Elbe.

In the lower part of the Keppgrund is the Keppmühle, a former watermill, the only one remaining of four mills that were here in 1721. It is thought there was a mill on the site in the 12th century; the present half-timbered building dates from 1781. By the 19th century the Keppgrund had become a popular place for excursions, and a restaurant opened at the Keppmühle. Milling ceased in 1902, and the restaurant closed in 1984.

The composer Carl Maria von Weber lived nearby, during summer months in the 1820s, in Hosterwitz, at that time a vine-growing village, now a part of Dresden. He often took evening walks through the Keppgrund and visited the Keppmühle. A plaque was placed on the building in 1963 to commemorate his visits.

== See also ==
- Dresden Elbe Valley
- Carl Maria von Weber Museum
