= Dresdner Verkehrsbetriebe =

Municipal transport company of Dresden

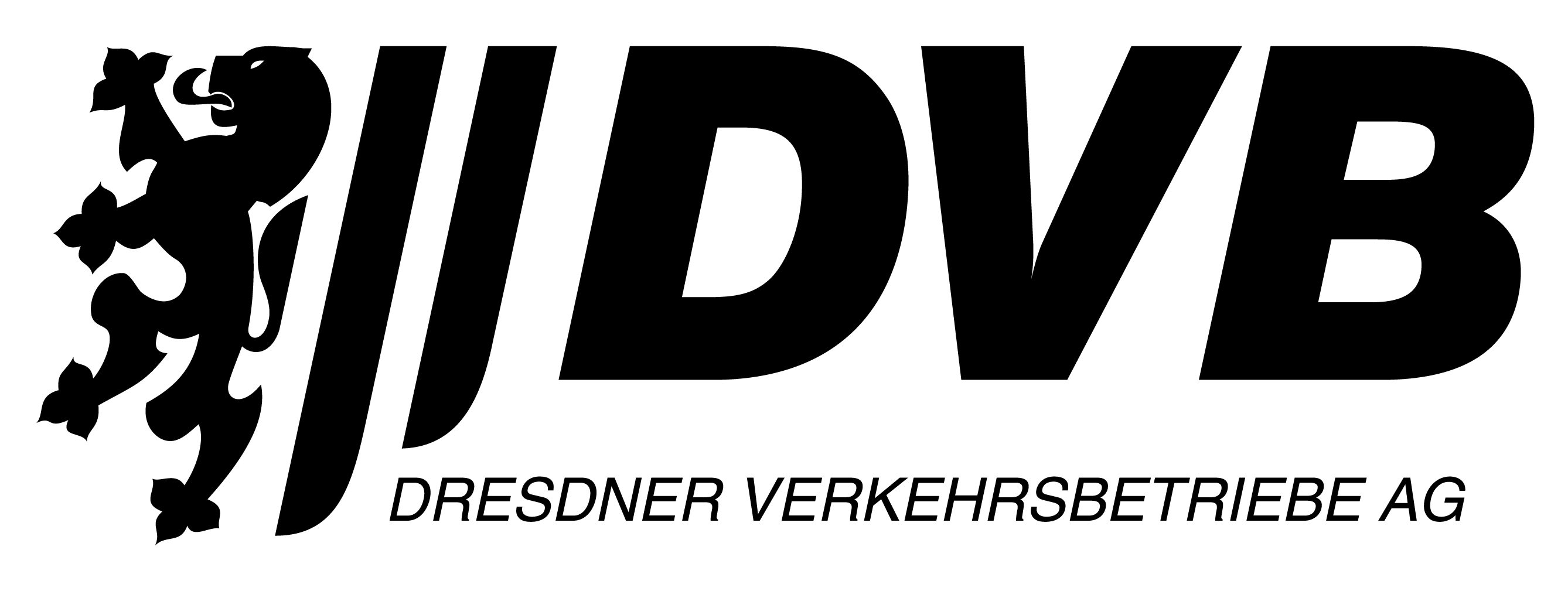
Logo Dresdner Verkehrsbetriebe

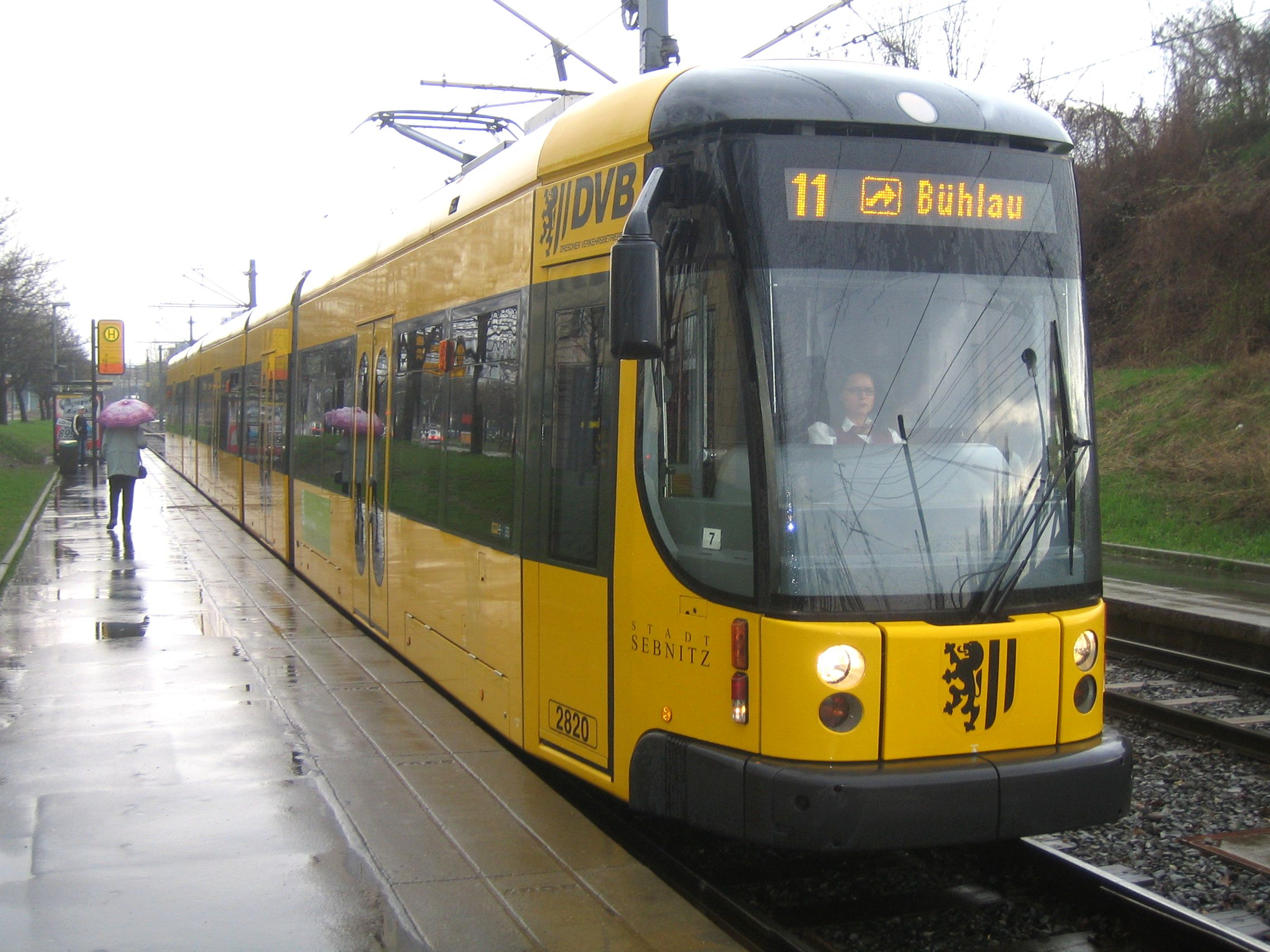
The longest trams set a record in length

Dresdner Verkehrsbetriebe AG (DVB) is the municipal transport company of the city of Dresden in Germany. It is a member of the Verkehrsverbund Oberelbe transport association that manages a common public transport structure for Dresden and its surrounding areas. The DVB operates the Dresden tram network comprising 12 tram lines, with a total line length of approximately 210 kilometres (130.5 mi) and a total route length of 132.7 kilometres (82.5 mi) (as of 2008), and 28 bus lines, with a total line length of approximately 306 kilometres (190.1 mi). It is also responsible for two funicular railways and three ferries across the River Elbe.

The DVB network carries some 142 million passenger journeys each year. In 2007, it generated €96.5m of revenue, covering 76% of costs.

== Tramways ==
Tramway network as at August 2025

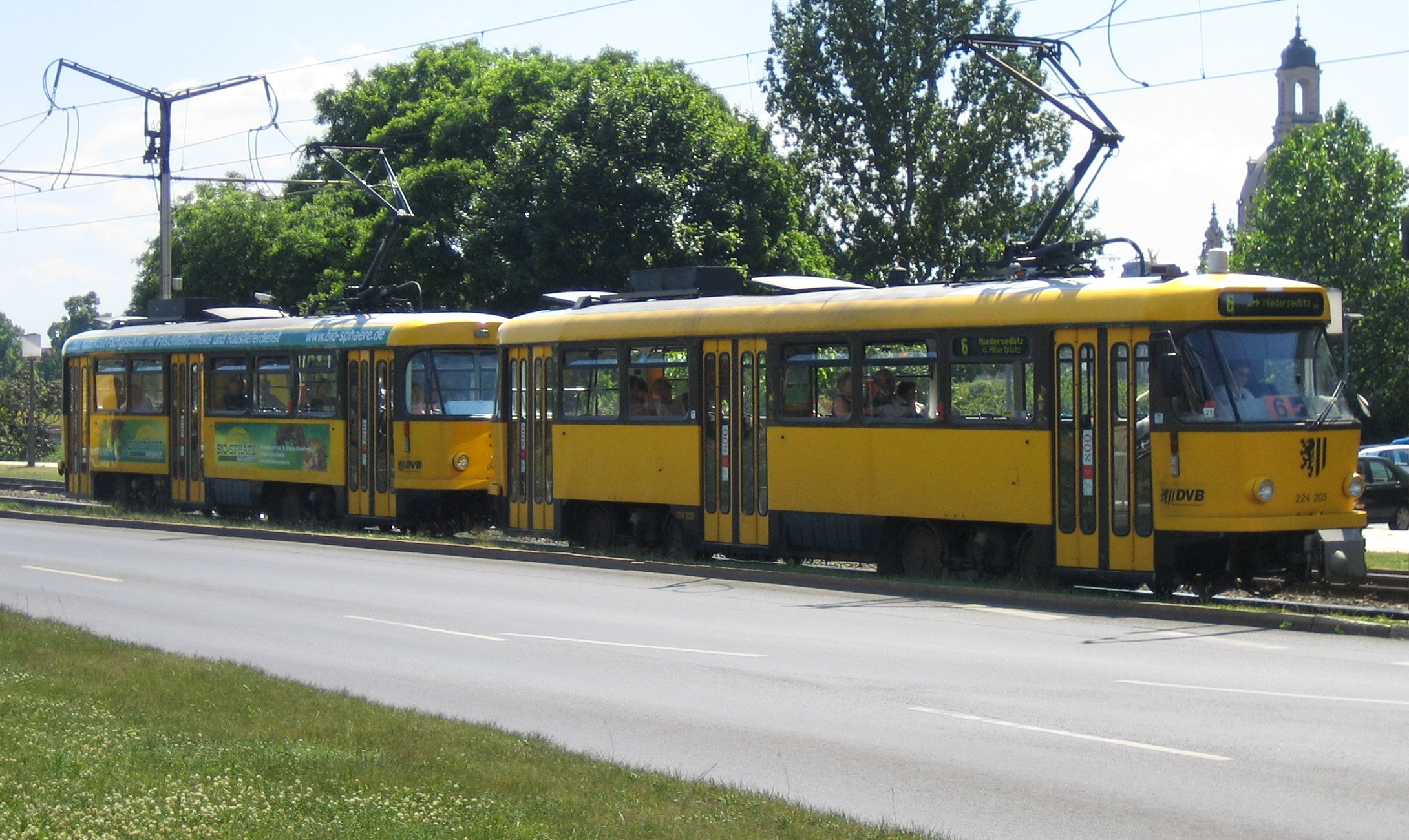
A two car Tatra T4 tram set

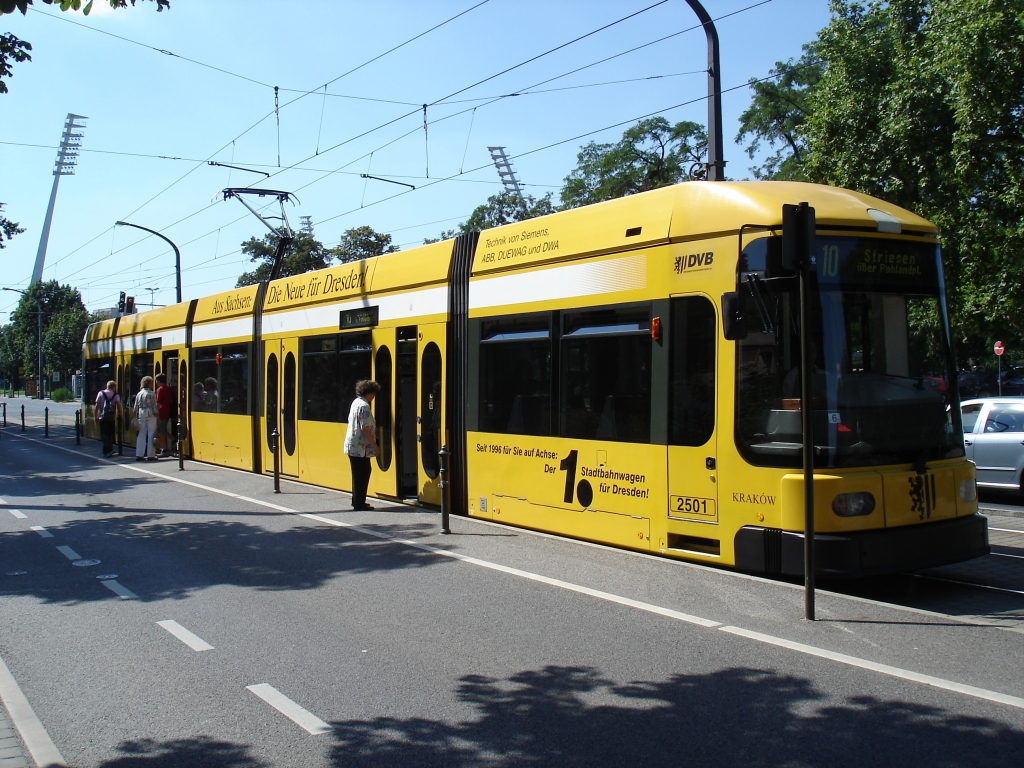
A DW 6-axle car at a tram stop; note the level boarding between stop and car

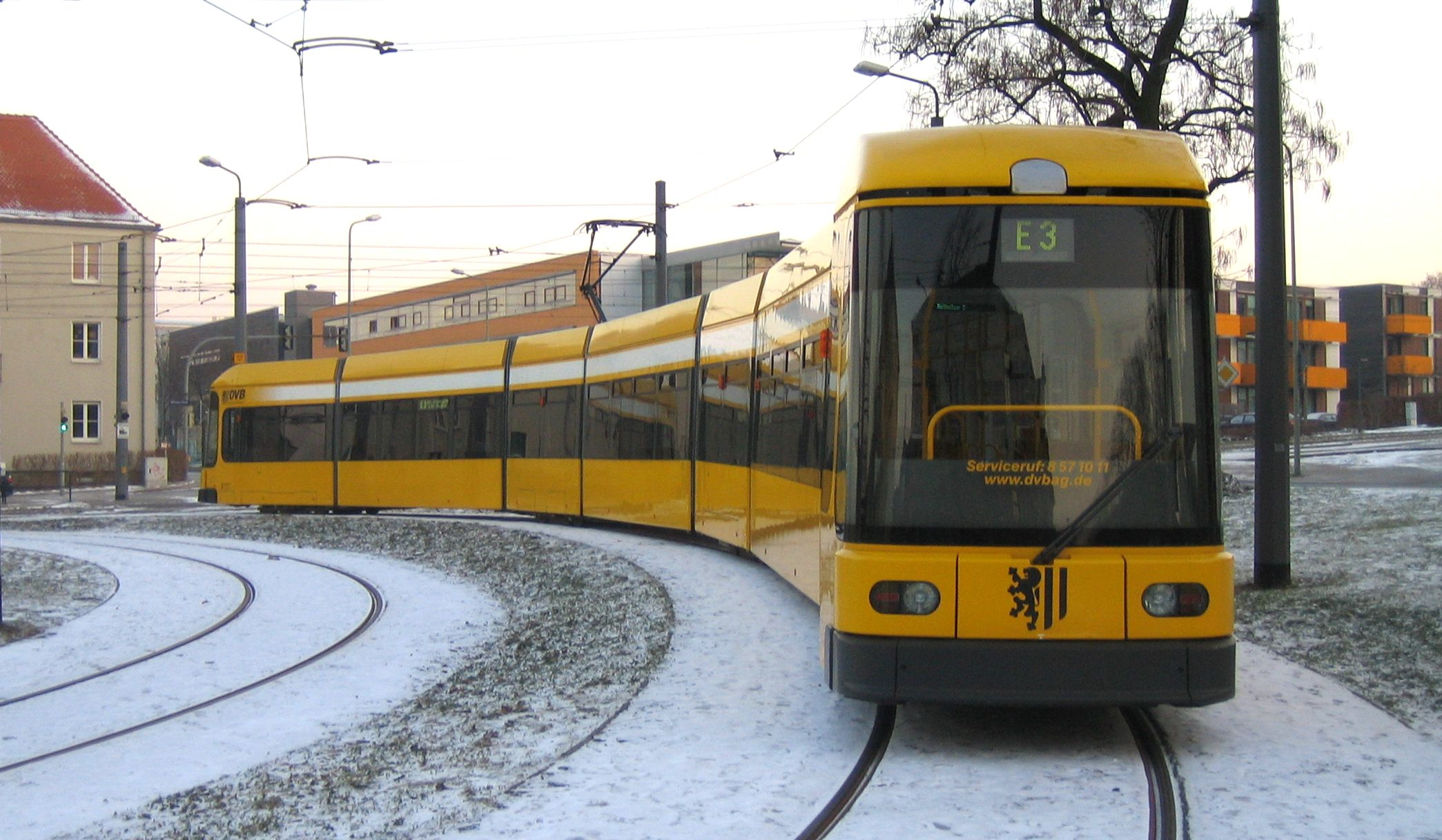
A DW 8-axle car in the snow

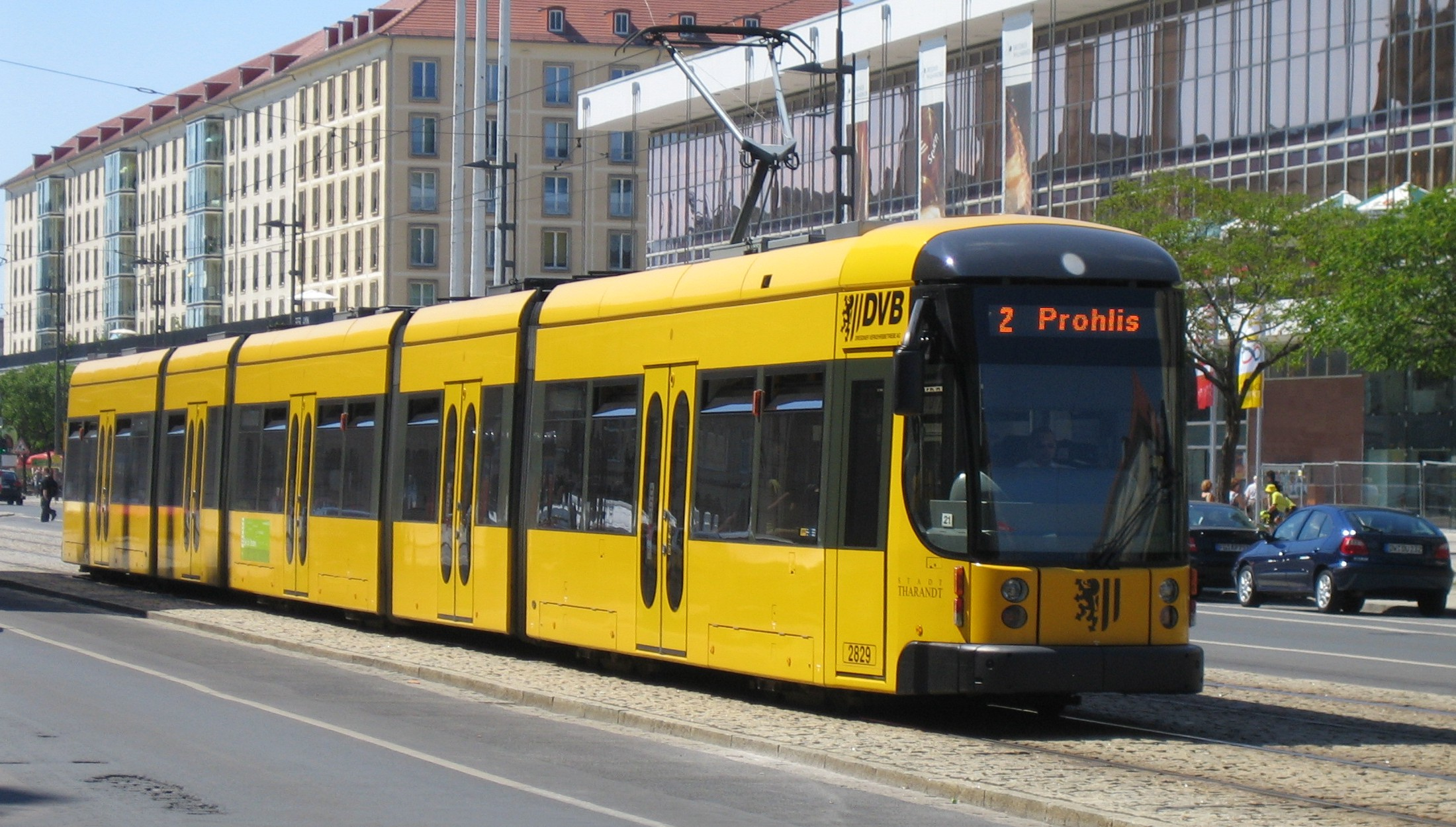
A Bombardier 12-axle car at Altmarkt in the city centre

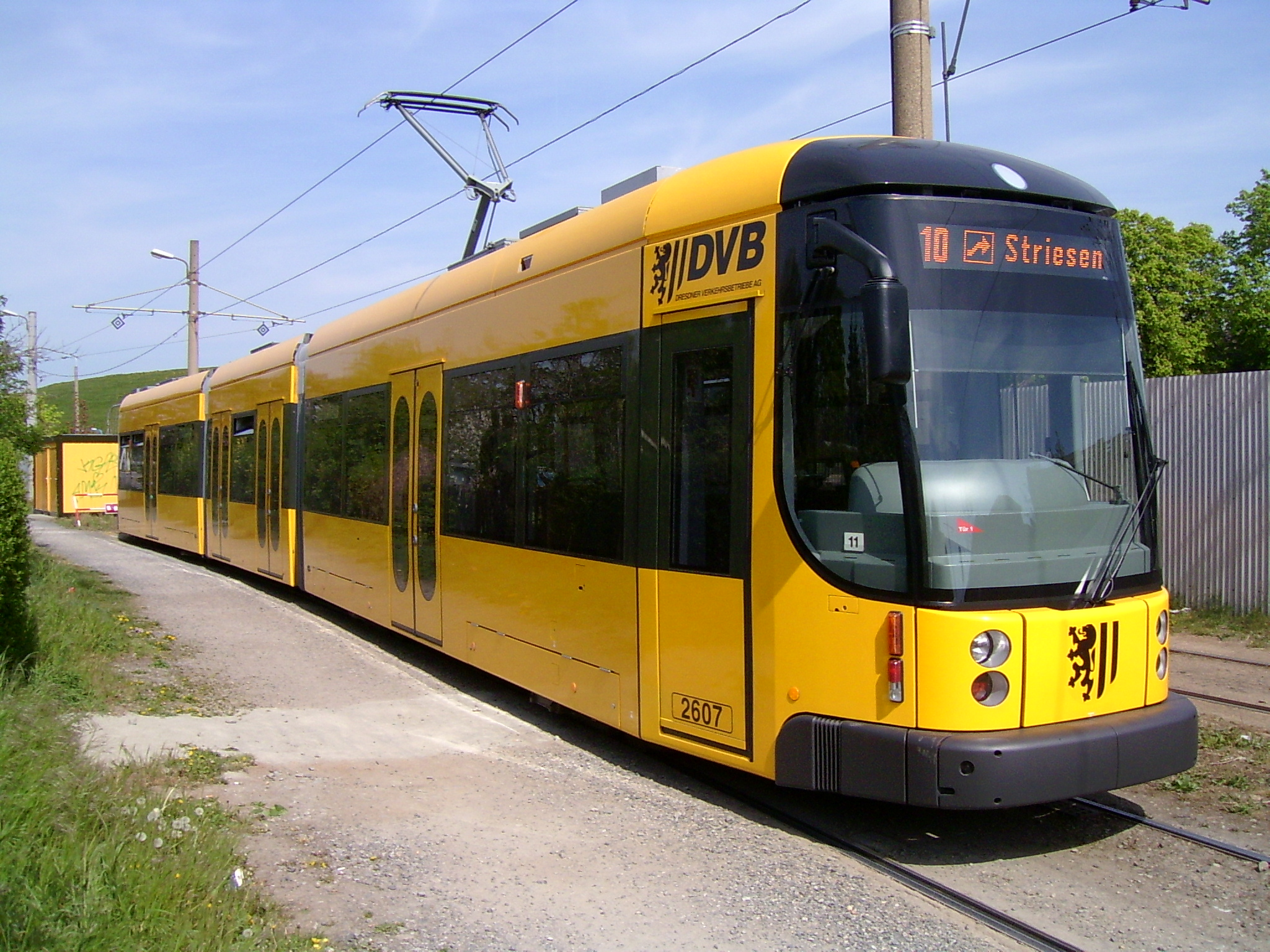
A Bombardier 8-axle car at the Friedrichstadt terminus

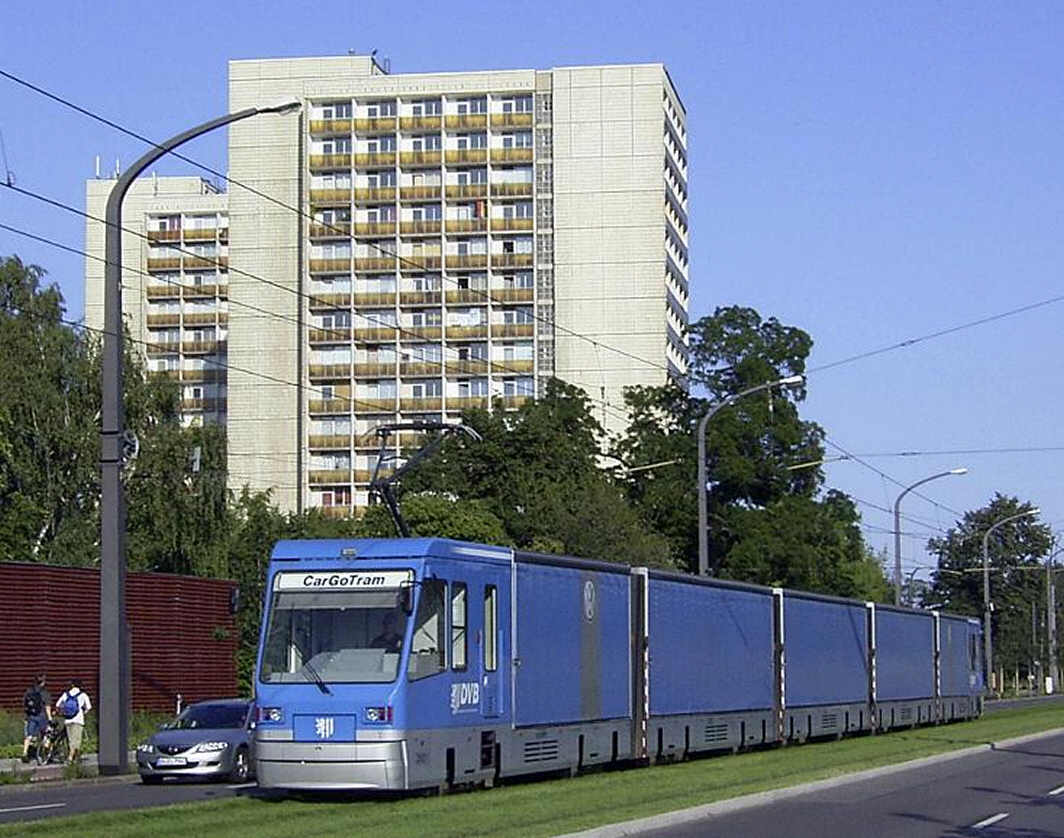
A CarGoTram on one of the grassed sections of track

The Dresden tramway system is the backbone of public transport in Dresden. DVB operates twelve tram routes, with a current total combined line length of 210 km (130.5 mi). As of 2008, there was 291.6 kilometres (181.2 mi) of track, which translated into 132.7 kilometres (82.5 mi) of actual tram route, serving 154 tram stops. The tram fleet is made up of 166 modern tramsets (with 31 older trams).

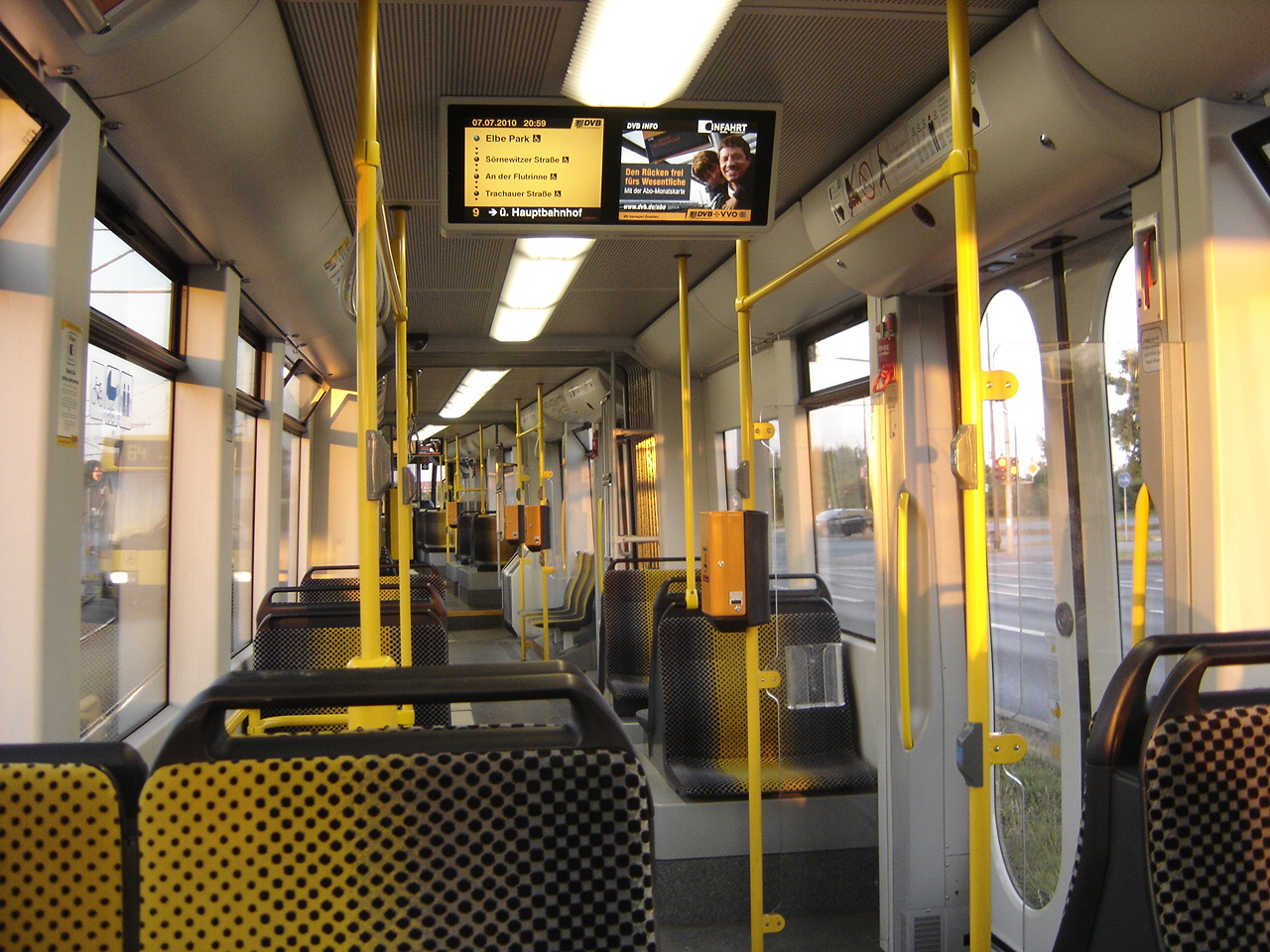
Interior of a tram

The origins of the Dresden tramway can be traced back to the year 1872, when the first horse-drawn line opened between the city centre and the former village of Blasewitz, now a borough of Dresden.

=== Tram network ===
The Dresden tramway is a mixed system of traditional street running, especially in the inner city boroughs close to the city centre, and modern light rail lines. The tramway uses the unusual and completely unique track gauge of 1,450 mm (4 ft 9 3/32 in), which is just 15 mm or 19/32 in wider than 1,435 mm (4 ft 8 1/2 in) standard gauge.

In recent years, street running has been replaced by independent right-of-way arrangements wherever possible, and new extensions created in the same form. In November 2008, a 2.8-kilometre (1.7 mi) extension of route 7 was opened from Gorbitz to Pennrich, in Dresden's south eastern suburbs. In May 2011, a 1.6-kilometre (0.99 mi) extension of route 10 opened from Friedrichstrasse to the city's Messe or exhibition centre, involving construction of a 315-metre (1,033 ft 6 in) long, 15-metre (49 ft 3 in) wide, and 5.4-metre (17 ft 9 in) high bridge across the floodplain of the River Elbe.

Unlike various other German cities of comparable size, no stadtbahn style tunnel sections or high platform stations have been created. However, many tram stops have been rebuilt so as to be fully accessible to physically disabled persons, and to allow level boarding to the low floor trams that now operate most services.

Different routes can be identified by a route number and a colour code. The current routes are:

Number	Route	Length	Time	Stops
1	Prohlis – Gruna – Straßburger Platz – Postplatz – Bahnhof Mitte – Friedrichstadt – Leutewitz	15.4 kilometres (9.6 mi)	47 min	34
2	Kleinzschachwitz – Gruna – Straßburger Platz – Postplatz – Bahnhof Mitte – Cotta – Gorbitz	18.2 kilometres (11.3 mi)	55 min	38
3	Coschütz – Plauen – Hauptbahnhof – Pirnaischer Platz – Albertplatz – Bahnhof Neustadt – Trachenberge – Wilder Mann	11.9 kilometres (7.4 mi)	38 min	25
4	Prohlis – Strehlen – Zoo – Hauptbahnhof – Postplatz – Mickten – Radebeul – Coswig – Weinböhla	30.3 kilometres (18.8 mi)	84 min	62/63
6	Niedersedlitz – Blasewitz – Albertplatz – Bahnhof Neustadt – Bahnhof Mitte – Löbtau – Wölfnitz (– Gorbitz)	22.0 kilometres (13.7 mi)	67 min	44/45 (48/49)
7	Pennrich – Gorbitz – Löbtau – Hauptbahnhof – Pirnaischer Platz – Albertplatz – Klotzsche – Weixdorf	23.2 kilometres (14.4 mi)	63 min	43/44
8	Südvorstadt – Hauptbahnhof – Postplatz – Albertplatz – Hellerau	13.4 kilometres (8.3 mi)	40 min	27
9	Laubegast – Striesen – Straßburger Platz – Postplatz – Mickten – Kaditz	15.3 kilometres (9.5 mi)	47 min	37
10	Striesen – Straßburger Platz – Hauptbahnhof – Bahnhof Mitte – Vorwerkstraße (Friedrichstadt) – Messe Dresden	11 kilometres (6.8 mi)	36 min	23
11	Zschertnitz – Hauptbahnhof – Postplatz – Bahnhof Neustadt – Albertplatz – Weißer Hirsch – Bühlau	15.9 kilometres (9.9 mi)	48 min	31
12	Striesen – Blasewitz – Straßburger Platz – Postplatz – Löbtau – Cotta – Leutewitz	14.5 kilometres (9.0 mi)	49 min	32/33
13	Prohlis – Strehlen – Zoo – Straßburger Platz – Neustadt – Pieschen – Mickten (– Kaditz)	14.7 kilometres (9.1 mi)	48 min	37 (43)

Future plans, as part of the Stadtbahnprogramm 2020, include 14.9 kilometres (9.3 mi) of new tram route, with work starting in 2014. Some 10.5 kilometres (6.5 mi) would be on reserved track, and the new routes would replace bus routes 61 and 62, some of the city's busiest, with an estimated cost of 223 million euros. The new routes comprise:

- Prager Str to Plauen Bhf via Budapester Str and Chemnitzer Str
- Großer Garten to Löbtau via Technische Universität
- City Center to Fetscherplatz via Pillnitzer Str and Striesener Str
- Sachsenallee to Max-Planck-Institute via Johannstadt
- Bühlau to Weißig

Part of the work for Stadtbahnprogramm 2020 has been completed. Routes 9 and 13 were realigned along a 1.1-kilometre (0.68 mi) section to provide better connections with regional trains at Dresden-Strehlen station in July 2019.

On all tramway routes except routes 4 and 7, a general 10-minute headway is offered on weekdays, extending to 15 minutes on Saturday, Sunday and in the evening. On the main lines through the inner city, where different routes intertwine, vehicles run up to every two minutes. Route 4, which extends a considerable distance beyond the city boundary to the towns of Radebeul, Coswig and Weinböhla, operates the standard 10 or 15 minute interval service as far as Radebeul West, and a 30-minute service beyond that to Coswig and Weinböhla. Route 7, the busiest line, has reduced its frequency to every 20 minutes on its outer section between Gorbitz and Pennrich.

=== Tram fleet ===
Most of the trams operating in Dresden are articulated low floor cars, of two different basic designs, each of which has several variants. The first generation of low floor cars was built by Deutsche Waggonbau (DW) in Bautzen between 1995 and 2002; both 6 and 8 axle variants exist. The second generation of low floor cars have been built since 2003 by Bombardier Transportation, also in Bautzen, and are of that manufacturer's Flexity Classic design; both 8 and 12 axle variants exist. The articulated cars vary in length from 30 to 45 metres (98 ft 5 in to 147 ft 8 in) long; all run as single car sets.

The fleet used to be composed of ČKD Tatra trams that provided service towards the end of the GDR era. At present some Tatra T4 cars built between 1968 and 1984 are still in service, but it is intended that they will all be replaced by 2010. The Tatra cars are all high floor, precluding level boarding from tram stops, and run in two car sets with a set length of some 30 metres (98 ft).

The DVB tram fleet operates out of three depots; at Gorbitz on routes 2,6 and 7 in south west Dresden, at Trachenberge on route 3 in the north-west, and Reick on routes 1, 9 and 13 in the south-east. Gorbitz is new facility opened in 1996 and includes a new central workshops. Trachenberge and Reick are older facilities that have both been heavily rebuilt to similar standards, whilst several other older depots have been closed. The former central workshops at Trachenberge, adjacent to the current depot, now house the Dresden Tram Museum, which has a collection including examples of many former Dresden trams.

=== CarGoTram ===
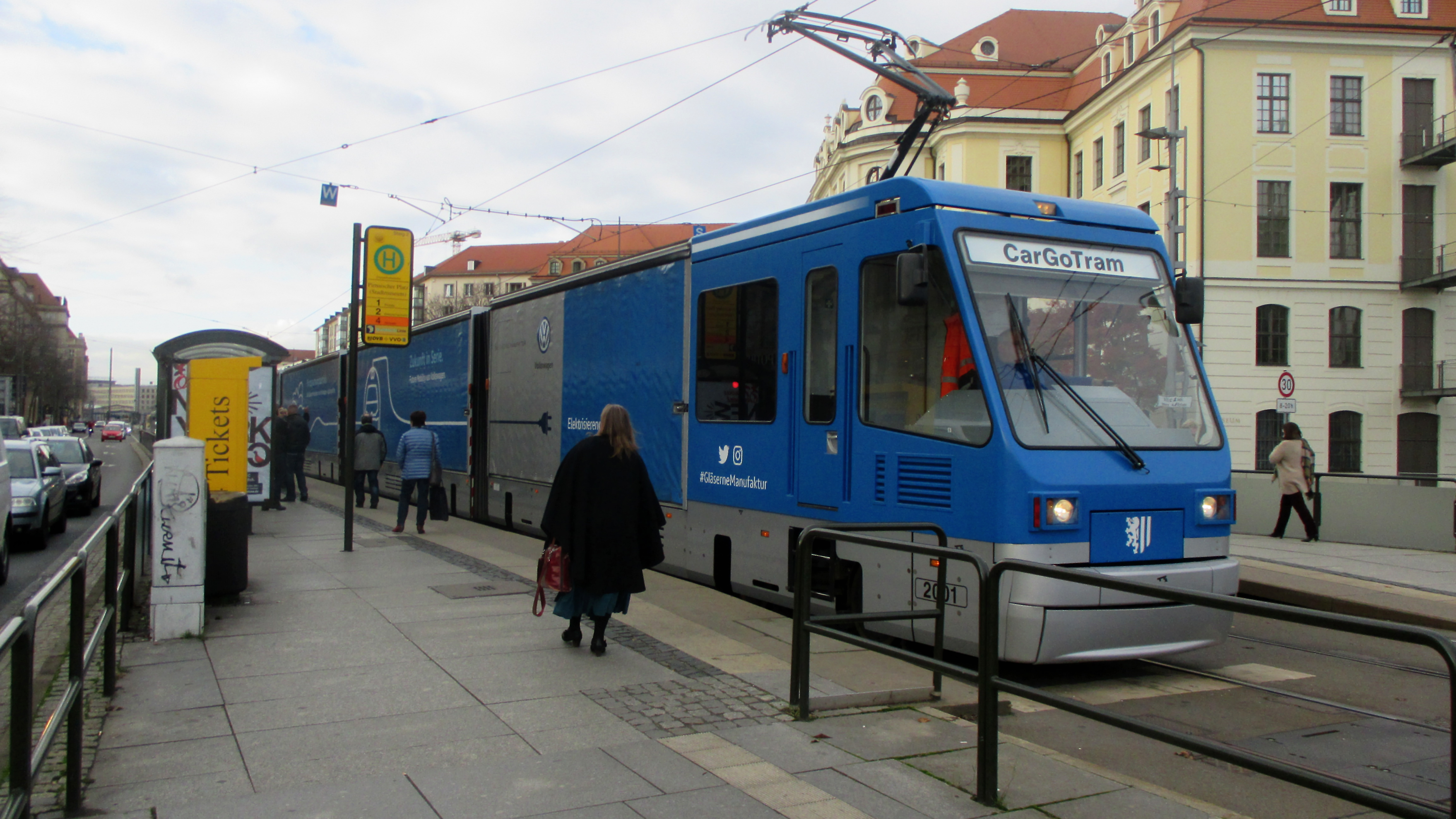
CarGoTram - Pirnaischer Platz - Dresden

The CarGoTram is a freight carrying tram that supplies Volkswagen's Transparent Factory, crossing the city. The two trams, up to 60 metres (200 ft) long, are the longest vehicles allowed to use roads in Dresden. The connection by tram was established to reduce the number of trucks used. The factory is located to the east of the city centre, next to the Großer Garten, whilst the distribution depot that loads the parts is to the west of the city centre.

== Buses ==
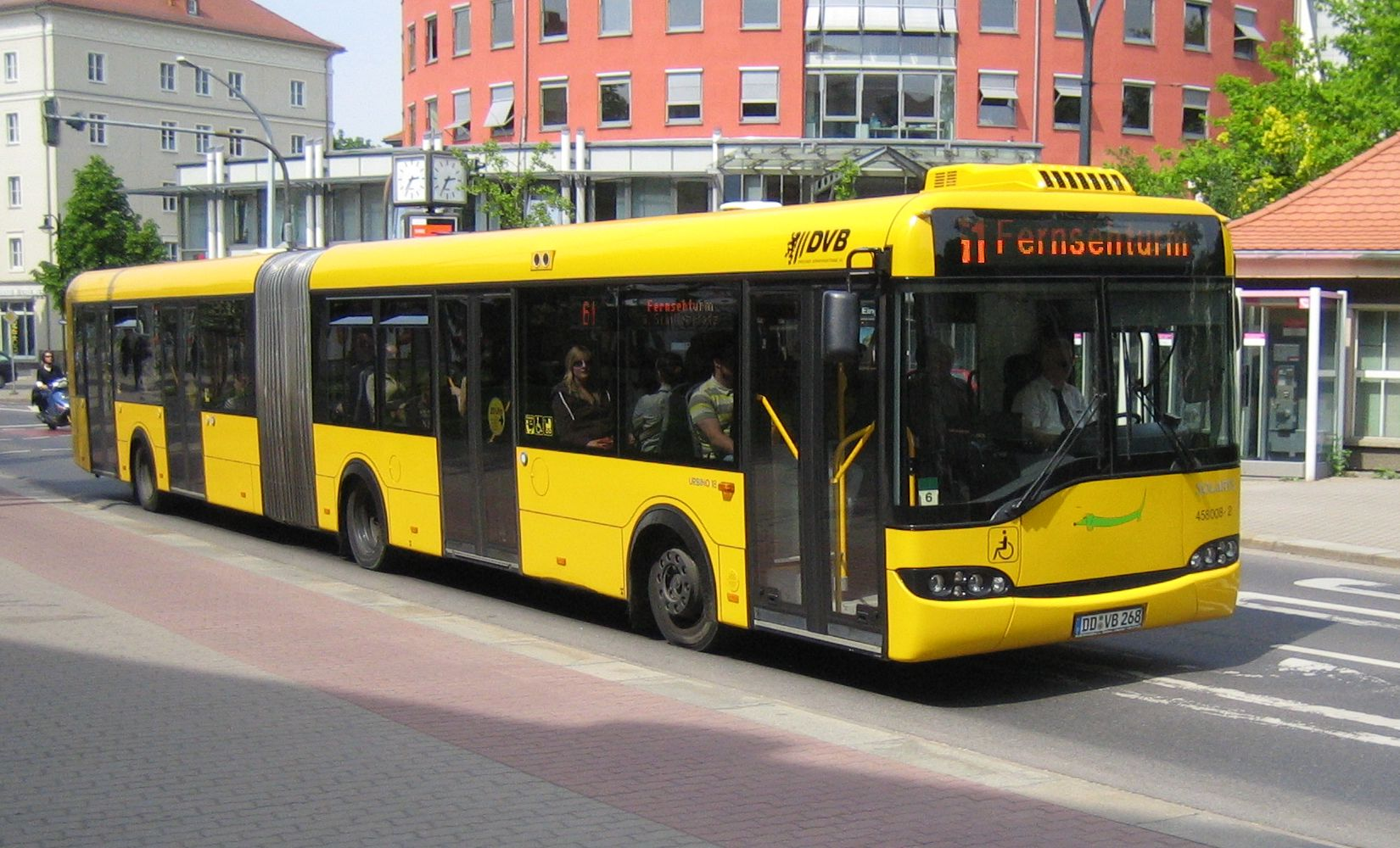
Solaris Urbino 18 articulated bus on route 61

The DVB operates 28 city bus routes, with a total route length of about 306 kilometres (190 mi). The routes are operated by a fleet of 145 buses.

Two of the city bus routes, the 75 and 62, provide trunk cross-city service, serving parts of Dresden not served tram routes. Most of the remaining bus routes are intended as a supplement to the tramway network, and are designed to cross the main radial tram routes at a right or oblique angle.

The modernization of the bus fleet has been significantly faster than that of the tram fleet. By 2001 the last GDR era Ikarus bus had been retired. Today, the DVB uses a fleet of buses manufactured by EvoBus (under the Mercedes-Benz bus brand), MAN and Solaris. The whole fleet has a low floor, and over 100 of the buses are articulated. By now, 18 hybrid busses are operated.

Most of the DVB's bus fleet operate out of the central bus depot at Gruna, south-east of the inner city. However some 30 to 40 vehicles are kept at the Trachenberge tram depot.

=== Night buses ===
DVB provides a night service named GuteNachtLinie ('goodnight line'), which operates every day of the week (Monday-Sunday), although the frequency of the buses is greater on Friday, Saturday and before holidays when the routes run every 30 minutes between 22:45 and 04:45. DVB also provides an extension taxi service called Anruflinientaxi (or 'alita' for short) where taxis run on certain routes as a replacement for regular trams and buses at times of very low demand. Alita trips are considered normal public transport trips and do not cost more than a bus ticket. The customer can order one of these special taxis themselves, or, between 10 p.m. and 4 a.m. can request one from the tram or bus driver who is driving them, who will contact an alita taxi to wait at the passengers intended exit stop to facilitate their onward journey. Postplatz is the most important hub for night-time travel in Dresden. Most GuteNachtLinie routes meet here at the same time to allow people to switch routes. Further night travel in the Upper Elbe region is provided by VVO.

== Other modes ==
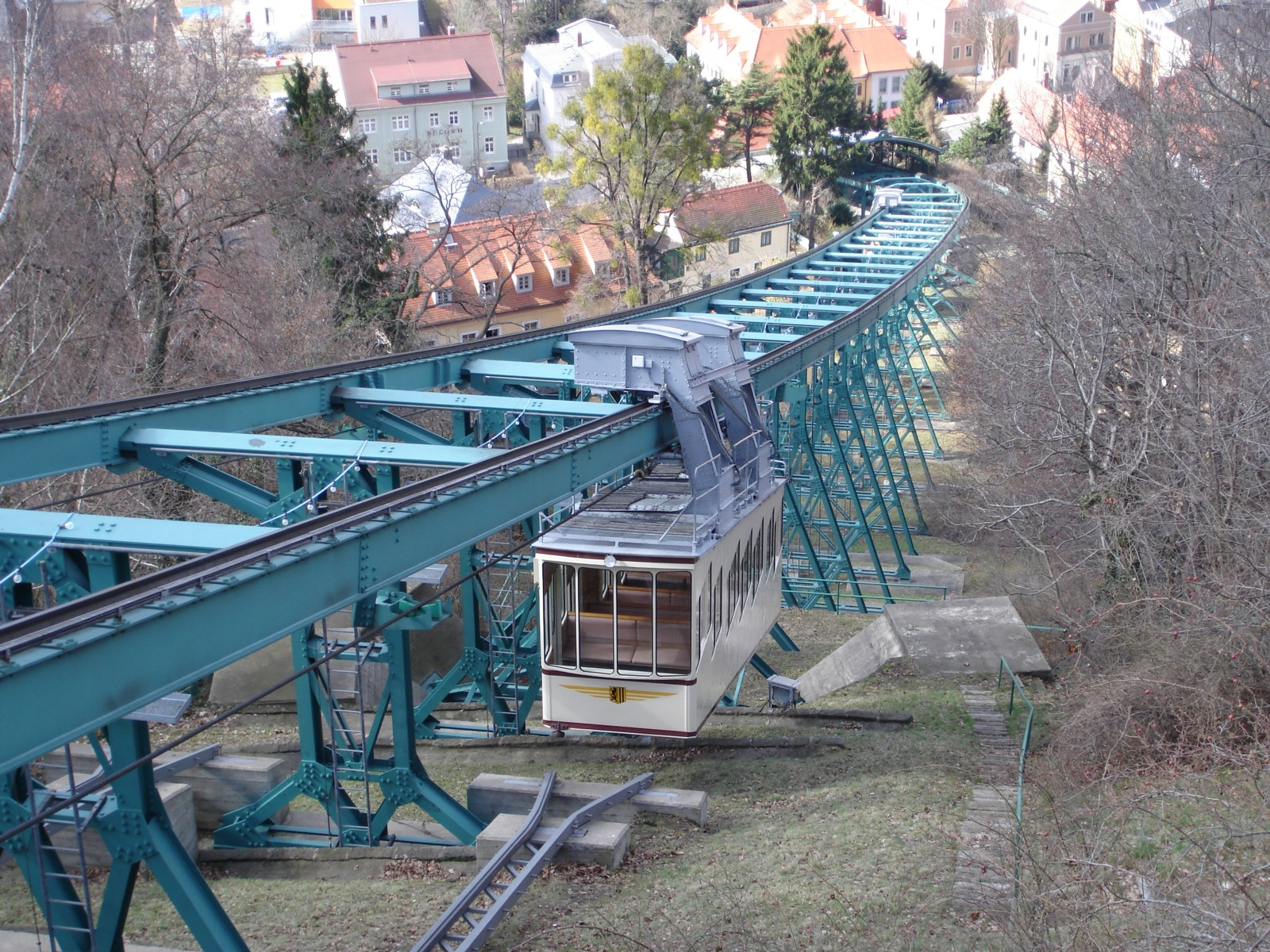
Schwebebahn Dresden

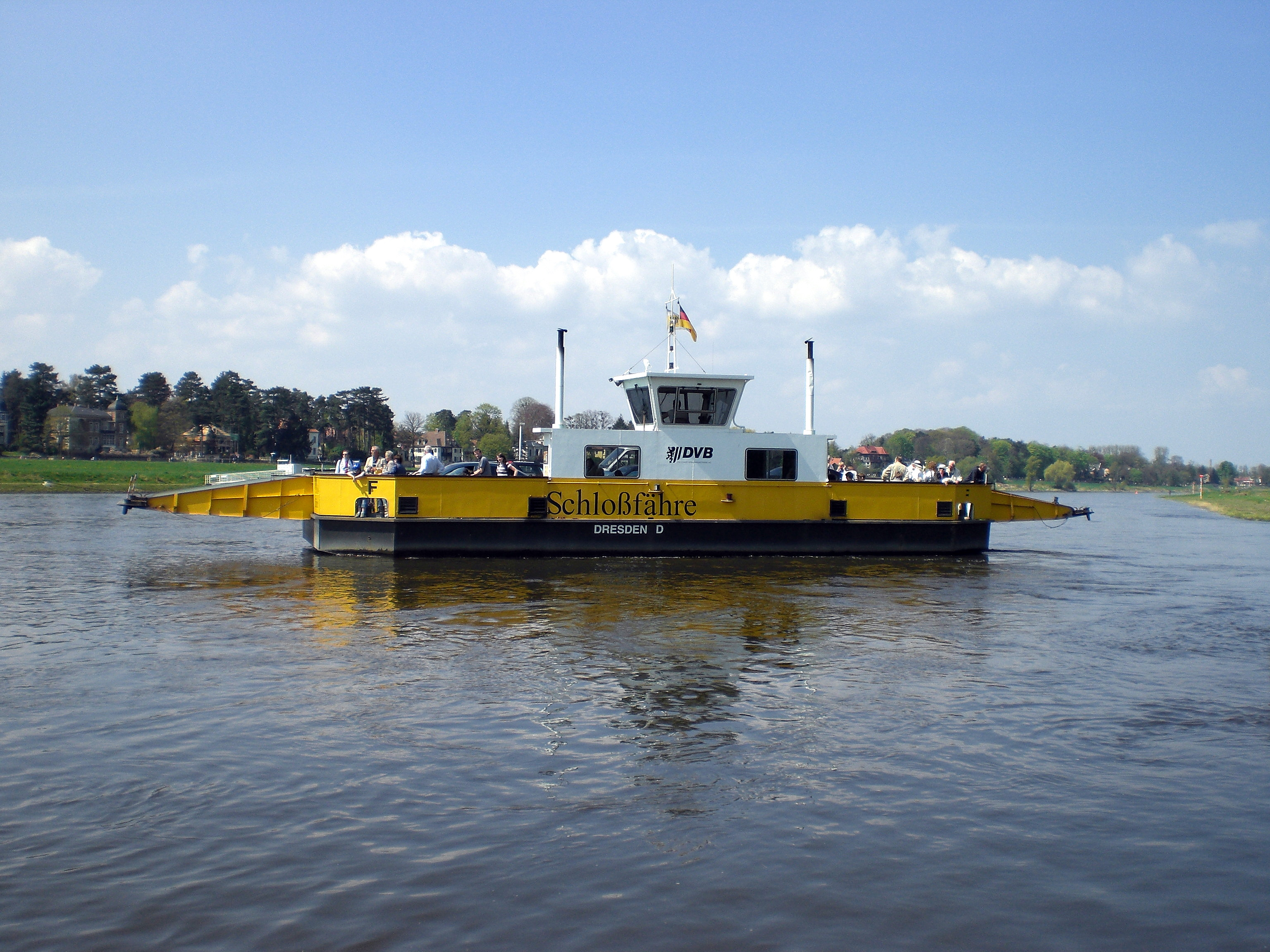
The Pillnitz to Kleinzschachwitz Ferry

Besides the tram and bus networks, common to many German cities, the DVB also operates two less common modes of city transportation.

=== Funicular railways ===
The DVB operates two very different funicular railways within Dresden. Both start from lower terminals close to each other, in the district of Loschwitz and near to the famous Blue Wonder bridge over the River Elbe. The Standseilbahn Dresden is a conventional funicular that runs some 500 metres (1,600 ft) to Weißer Hirsch. The Dresden Suspension Railway is a unique cable-operated suspension railway, a kind of hanging monorail, that covers about 250 metres (820 ft) to Oberloschwitz.

Both funiculars are operated by two cars, which counterbalance each other. The Standseilbahn is single track with a passing loop, whilst the Schwebebahn has two parallel 'tracks' on its substantial elevated structure. Both are electrically propelled.

=== Ferries ===
The DVB operates three ferry services across the River Elbe in Dresden. The Pillnitz to Kleinzschachwitz Ferry carries both passengers and cars. The Laubegast to Niederpoyritz Ferry and Johannstadt to Neustadt Ferry are both pedestrian only.

The ferry services are maintained by a fleet of four passenger-only ferries and one car and passenger ferry. All the vessels are diesel propelled but of different designs. The oldest ferry dates from 1927 and the most recent from 2012. The smallest ferry carries a maximum of 60 passengers, whilst the largest passenger ferry carries up to 120. The car ferry can carry 140 passenger and 8 cars, or 350 passengers if no cars are carried. All ferries are painted in the DVB's yellow and white livery.
