= Pappritz =

Pappritz is a German surname. Notable people with the surname include:

- Anna Pappritz (1861–1939), German writer and suffragist
- Erica Pappritz (1893–1972), German civil servant and writer
- Julie Pappritz, the wife of Carl Friedrich Zelter
