= Postplatz (Dresden) =

Square in Dresden, Germany

Coordinates: 51.0516°N 13.7325°E

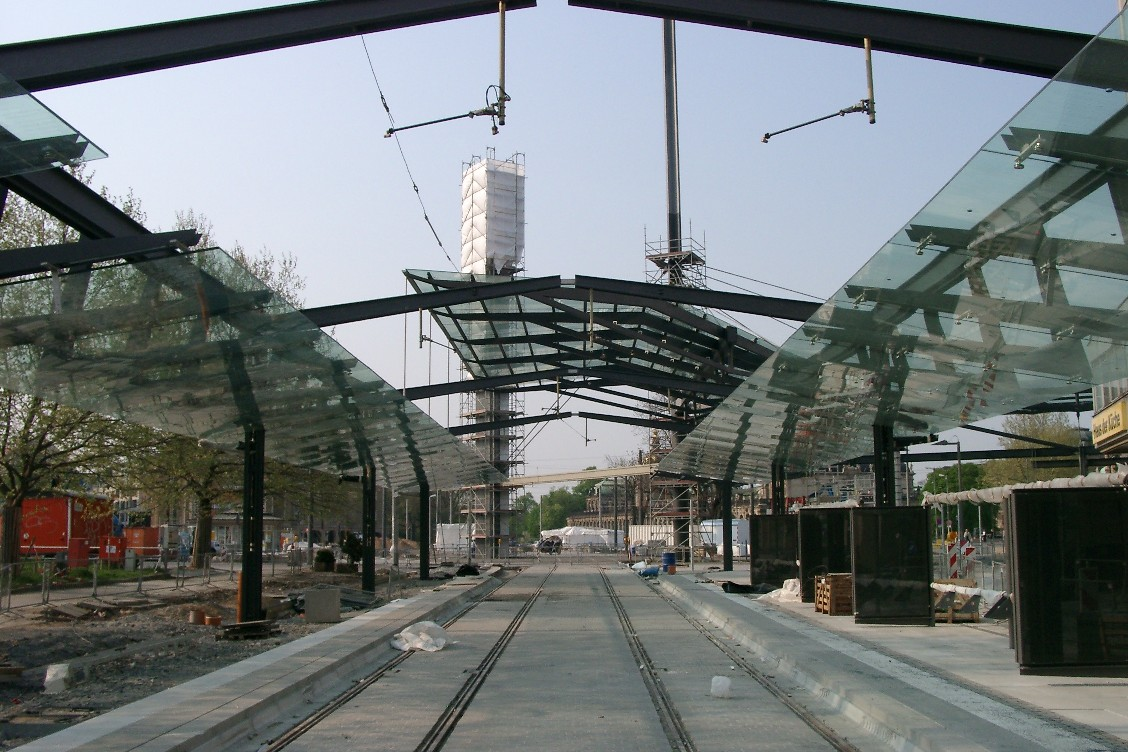
Construction work in 2006.

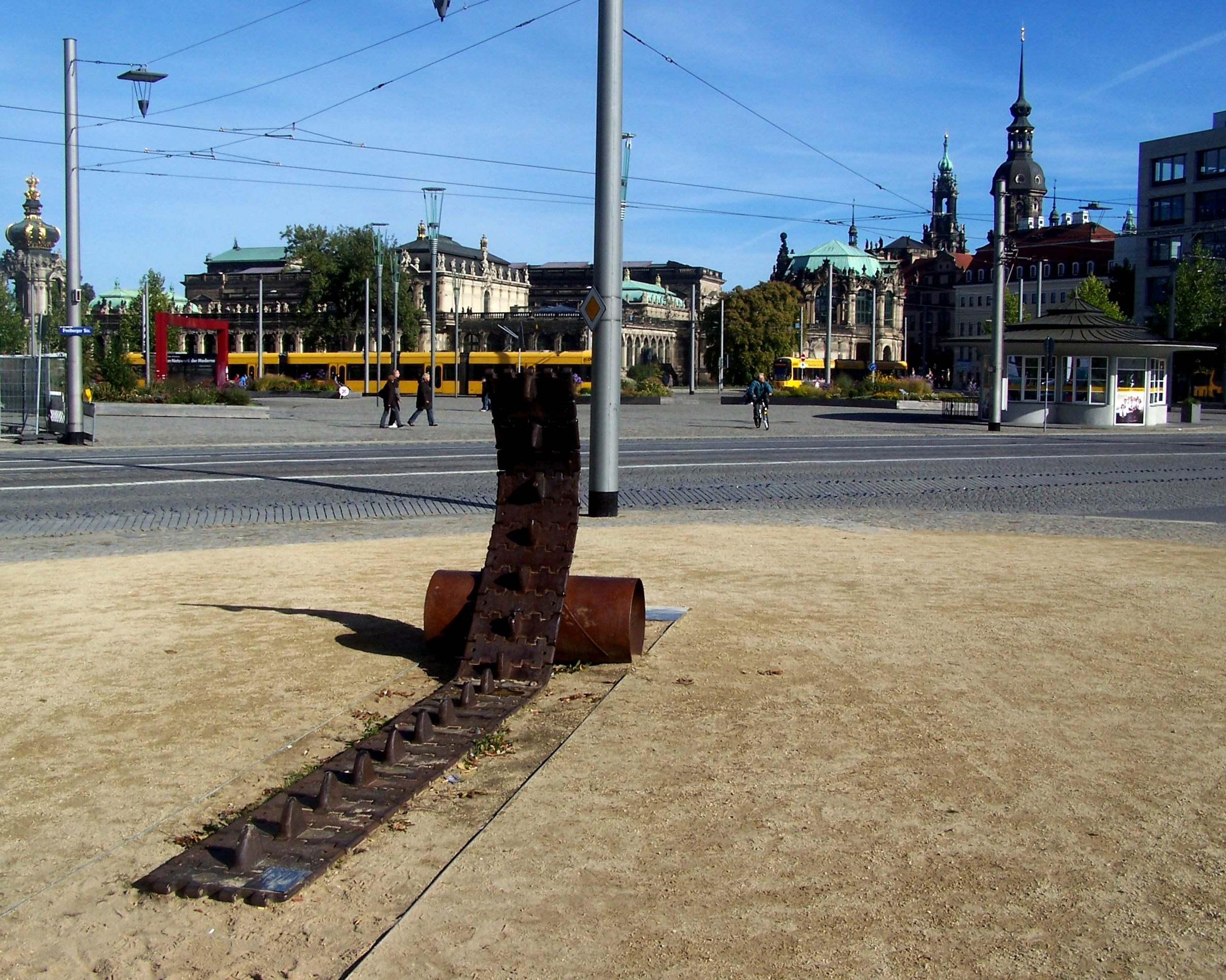
Memorial to the East German uprising of 1953.

The Postplatz is a central square in Dresden and an important traffic junction, especially for local public transport. It is located in the old town not far from the Zwinger.

Most routes of the night bus service GuteNachtLinie operated by DVB meet here at the same time to allow people to switch routes.
