= Inwohner =

Inwohner is a German expression for lower-ranking inhabitants of a populated place. The exact significance varies regionally, but the word generally refers to lodgers without real property.

In the Middle Ages and the early modern period in places such as in southern Germany, in Saxony and in Austria the word meant inhabitants of a town or a village who generally did not possess real property and therefore did not enjoy full civic rights. Of similar meaning are the expressions Inste and Instleute who were also lodgers in rural communities. Likewise, similarities exist to the expression Einlieger for day labourers without real property who rented living room from farmers. An Inwohner must be distinguished from a member of the household who was either related to the home owner or was a direct employee (e.g. a maid or a servant) of the latter.

== Regional variations ==
In Mecklenburg, inhabitants of towns were called [E]inwohner or Einlieger if they did not possess the status of a burgher nor any other specific privileges. According to the old country laws of Mecklenburg, burghers could only have one main occupation in trade, crafts, or services. Thus, special organisations similar to those of craftsmen also formed for those "farmer-burghers" who lived in the towns, but whose main occupation was agriculture. Their number, however, remained comparatively low in all Mecklenburg country towns.

In south-western Saxony, it became common around 1700 to speak of "propertied Inwohner". This could mean Hufners and other inhabitants of the villages who held real property, or home owners in towns. In this region as well as in the Vogtland, the sense of the word shifted towards today's Einwohner, meaning any inhabitant of a populated place.

In northern and north-eastern Germany, Instleute were day labourers contracted to work for certain landowners in exchange for living quarters, payment and wages in kind; they also had to provide a second labourer and acted thus as a kind of sub-contractors.

In Slovenia, so-called osabeniki were allocated living quarters in the wineyards where they worked.

In Switzerland, the expressions Beiwohner, Beisasse, medewohner and non-positus also refer to inhabitants of a municipality who do not possess full civic rights there, but have certain duties and enjoy certain rights according to the relevant regulations. These persons may nevertheless be of prominent financial standing.

== Rights and duties ==
Unpropertied inhabitants of medieval towns without full civic rights were called Inwohner. They were bound to work as day labourers for a master, e.g. a brewery, without being permanently employed. Inwohner in villages were dependent on the farmers in whose households they lodged, and were bound to perform a set amount of work for their landlords, thus providing a reserve of workers for busy times. Some earned an additional income from domestic trades such as shoe repair, broom making, or basket making.

Since the domicile of an Inwohner was not defined by real property, special rules had to be observed as to which clergymen were to perform marriage ceremonies among this class of inhabitants.

Regional laws fixed the duties of Inwohner and their landlords. For instance, the 1635 urbarium of Lustenfelden stipulates that, if a subject of the local lord had taken a person (Inman) as a tenant, both had to appear before the lord within a fortnight to record the Inman for whom the landlord had to pay a bond. An Inman who had left another lordship had to bring a letter of leave, to swear allegiance to the new lord, and to pay a fee of acceptance. After the Inman moved into the house of the landlord, a certain tax was payable every year which the landlord had to guarantee. An Inman who left had to request cancellation of the record, and had to pay a leaving fee, otherwise both landlord and tenant were liable to prosecution. Likewise, certain taxes were due upon the death of an Inman. Concealing the Inman status by a pretended employment was prohibited. However, the Inman was not liable for country taxes levied by the prince.

The increasing number of Inman relationships in the 17th and 18th centuries led to the erection of numerous tenements, e.g. in Linz, and to the development of an urban proletariat even under preindustrial circumstances.
