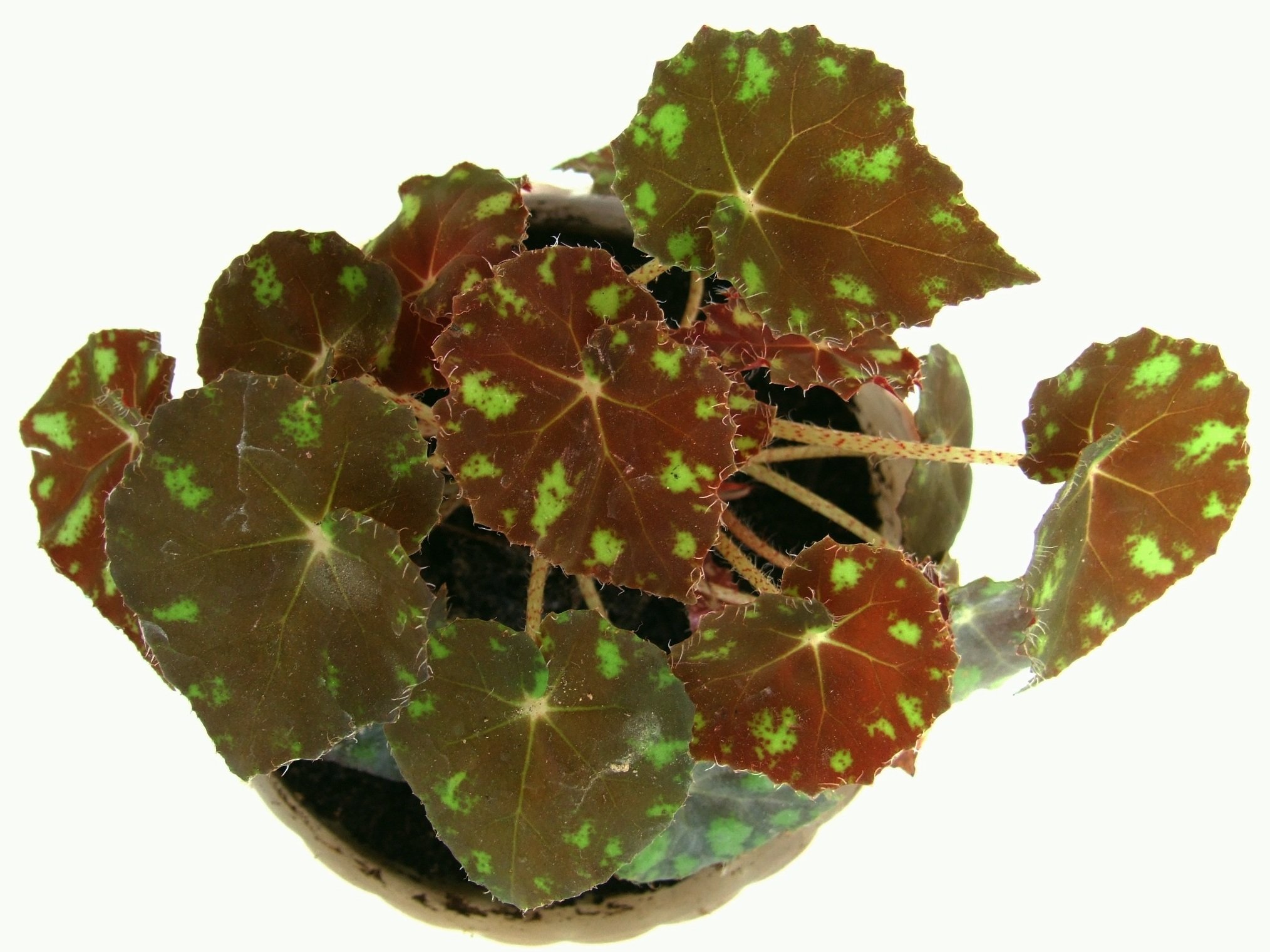
- Begonia bowerae 'Tiger' cultivar

Scientific classification
- Kingdom: Plantae
- Clade: Tracheophytes
- Clade: Angiosperms
- Clade: Eudicots
- Clade: Rosids
- Order: Cucurbitales
- Family: Begoniaceae
- Genus: Begonia
- Species: B. bowerae

Binomial name
- Begonia bowerae Ziesenh.

Synonyms
- Begonia bowerae var. major Ziesenh.; Begonia bowerae var. roseflora Ziesenh.

= Begonia bowerae =

Species of flowering plant

Begonia bowerae, the eyelash begonia, is a species of flowering plant in the family Begoniaceae, native to Oaxaca and Chiapas states of Mexico. A popular houseplant, a number of cultivars are available.

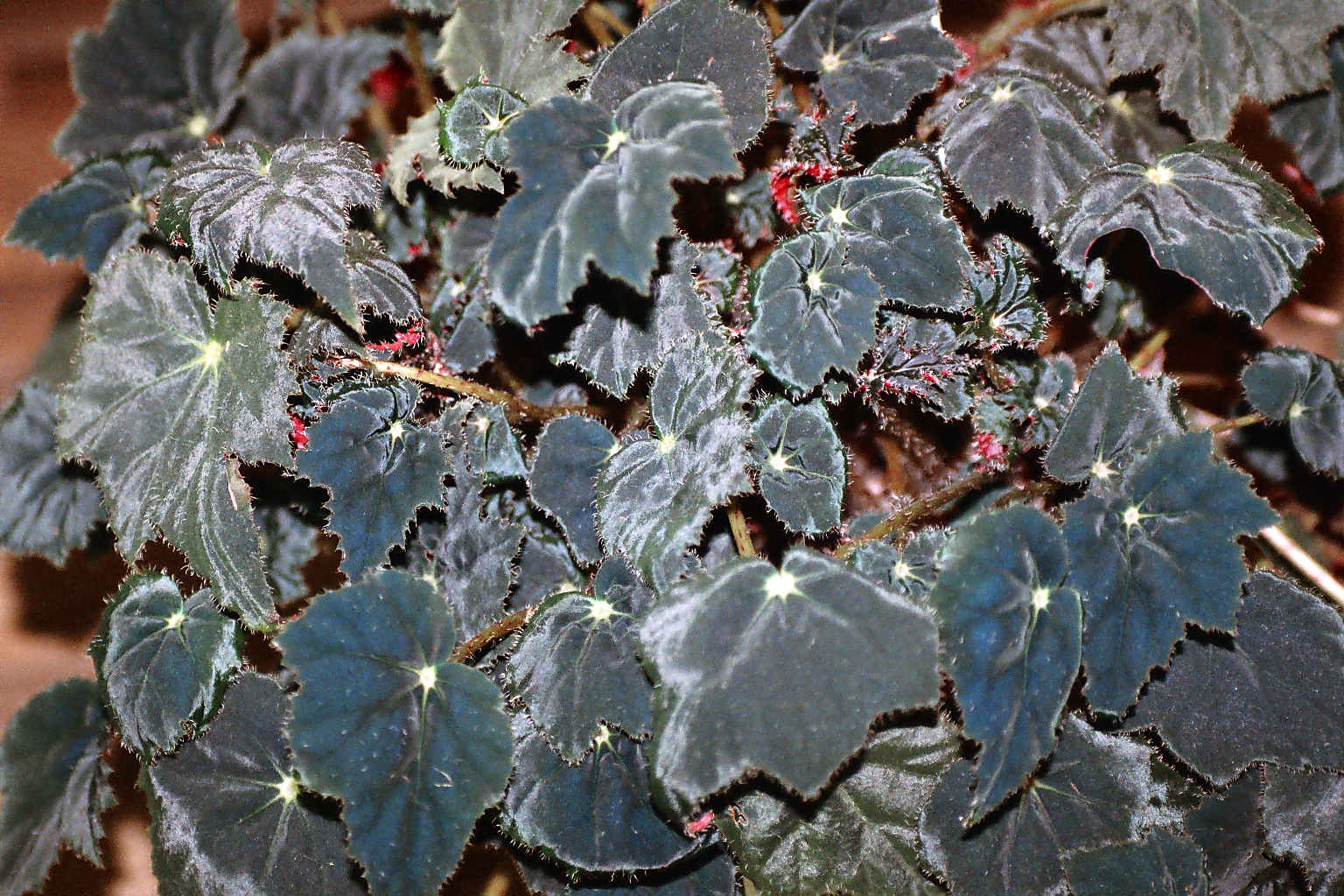
'Bethlehem Star' cultivar

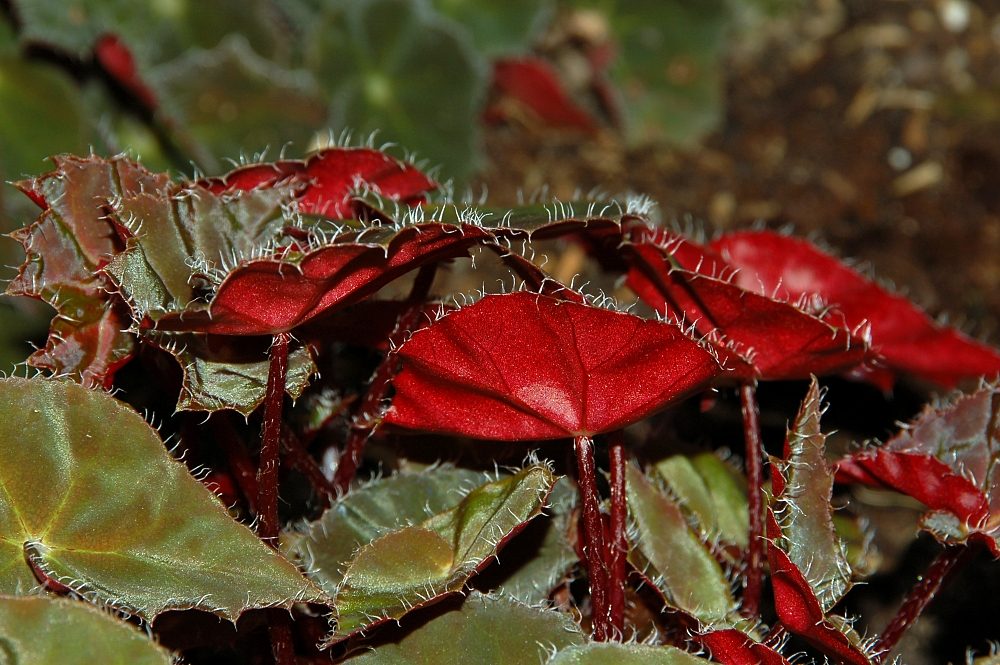
'Rubra' cultivar, showing "eyelashes"

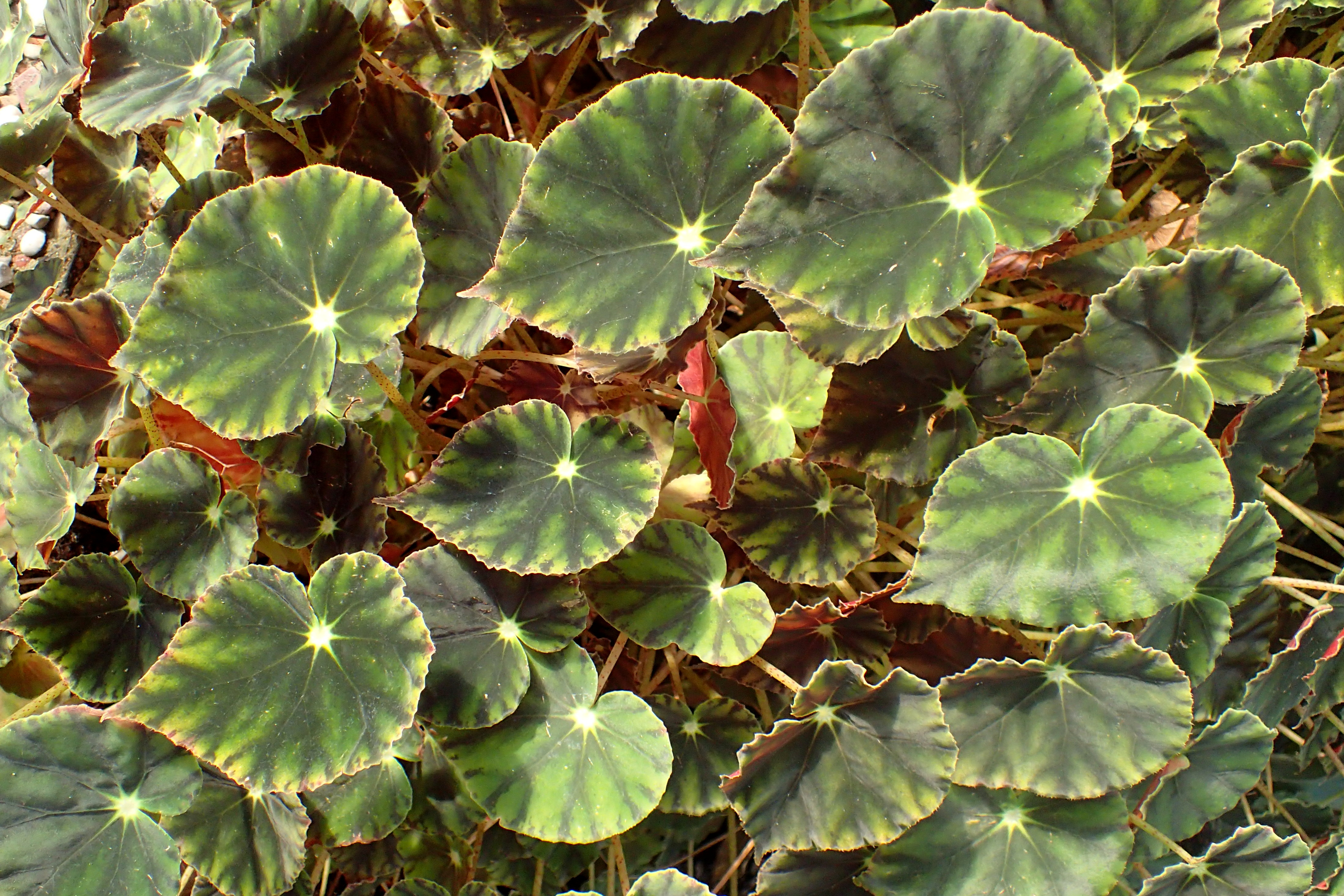
'Nigra Magra' cultivar

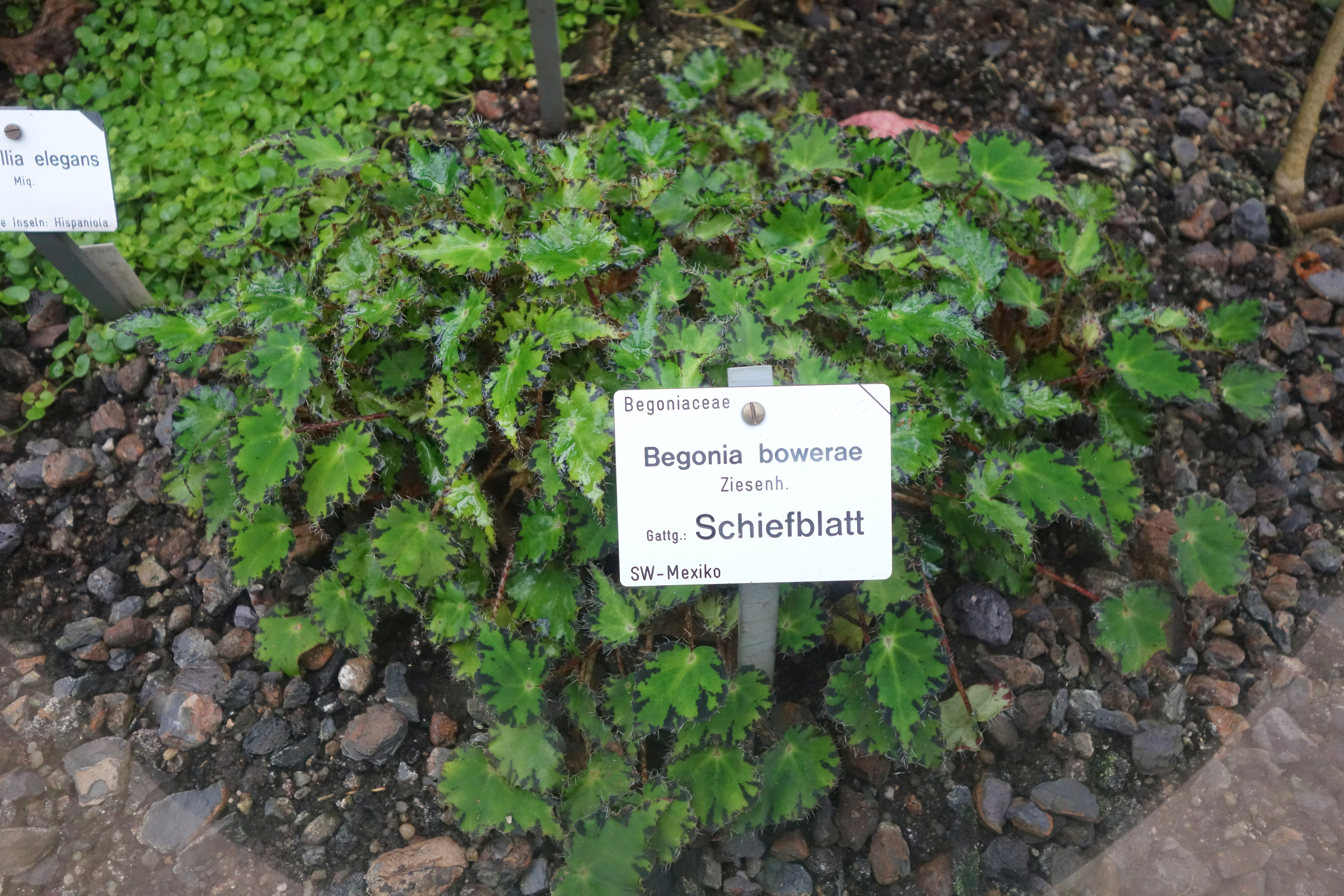
Wild-type at the Dresden Botanical Garden

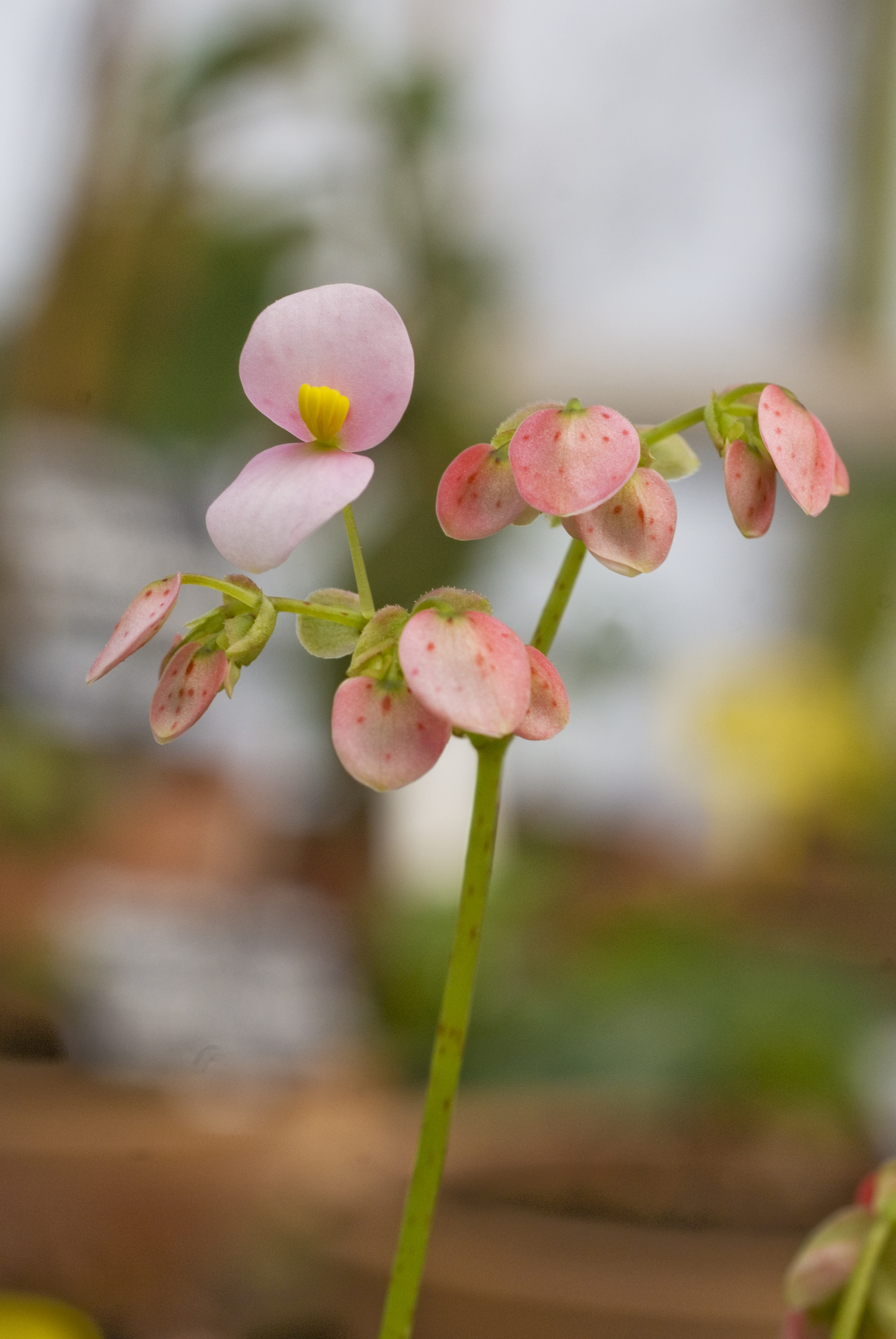
Flowers of putative variety roseflora

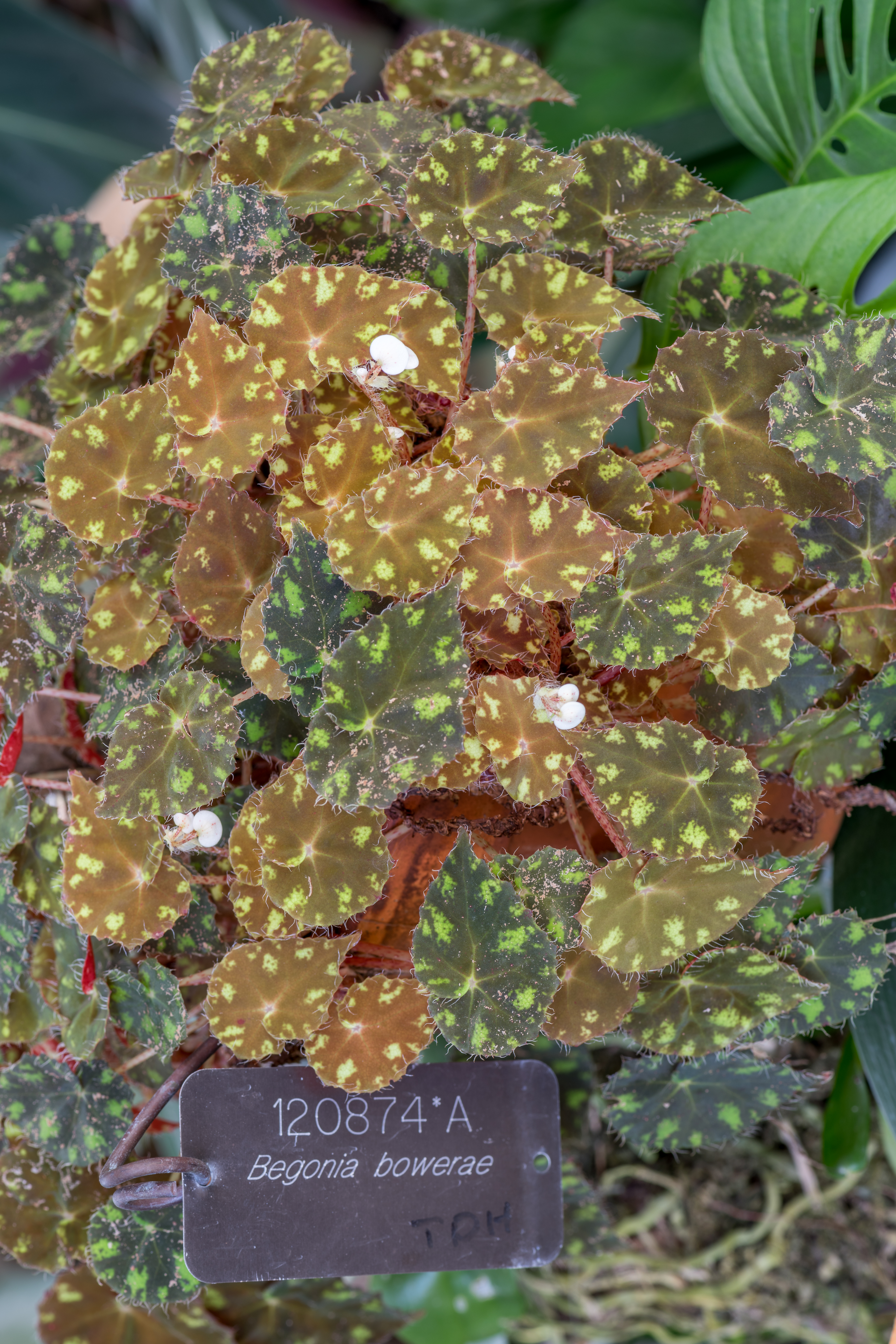
Younger leaves are redder.
