= Ludwig Reichenbach =

German botanist and ornithologist (1793–1879)

Heinrich Gottlieb Ludwig Reichenbach
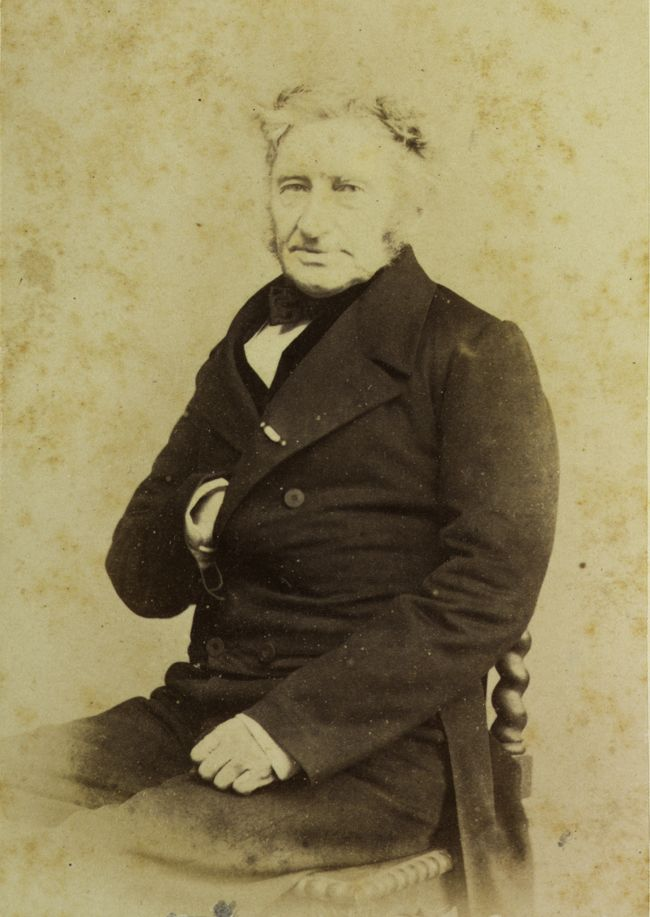
- Heinrich Gottlieb Ludwig Reichenbach
- Born: 8 January 1793; Leipzig, Germany
- Died: 17 March 1879 (aged 86)
- Scientific career
- Fields: botanist and ornithologist
- Author abbrev. (botany): Rchb.

Heinrich Gottlieb Ludwig Reichenbach (8 January 1793 – 17 March 1879) was a German botanist, ornithologist and illustrator. He was who first requested Leopold Blaschka to make a set of glass marine invertebrate models for scientific education and museum showcasing, the successful commission giving rise to the creation of the Blaschkas' glass sea creatures and, subsequently and indirectly, the more famous glass flowers.

== Early life ==
Born in Leipzig and the son of Johann Friedrich Jakob Reichenbach (the author in 1818 of the first Greek-German dictionary) Reichenbach studied medicine and natural science at the University of Leipzig in 1810, becoming a professor,and, eight years later, an instructor. In 1820, he was appointed the director of the Dresden natural history museum and a professor at the Surgical-Medical Academy in Dresden, where he remained for many years. Together with Carl Friedrich Heinrich Schubert, he started in 1822 to edit and distribute his first exsiccata work Lichenes exsiccati collecti atque descripti auctoribus L. Reichenbach et C. Schubert. Die Flechten in getrockneten Exemplaren, gesammelt und beschrieben von L. Reichenbach und C. Schubert. Later on he published several other exsiccatae, an example being Flora Germanica exsiccata sive Herbarium normale plantarum selectarum criticarumve, in Germania propria vel in adjacente Borussia, Austria et Hungaria, Tyroli, Helvetia Belgiaque nascentim, concinnatum editumque a Societate Florae Germanicae curante. For distributing and exchanging plant specimens he cooperated with many botanists, e.g., Friedrich Wilhelm Noë.

== Glass sea creatures ==
Director of the natural history museum in Dresden, Professor Reichenbach was faced with an annoying yet seemingly unsolvable problem of showing invertebrate marine life. Land-based flora and fauna were not an issue, exhibiting mounted and stuffed creatures such as gorillas and elephants was a relatively simple matter, with their lifelike poses attracting and exciting the museums' visitors. Invertebrates, however, by their very nature, posed a problem.

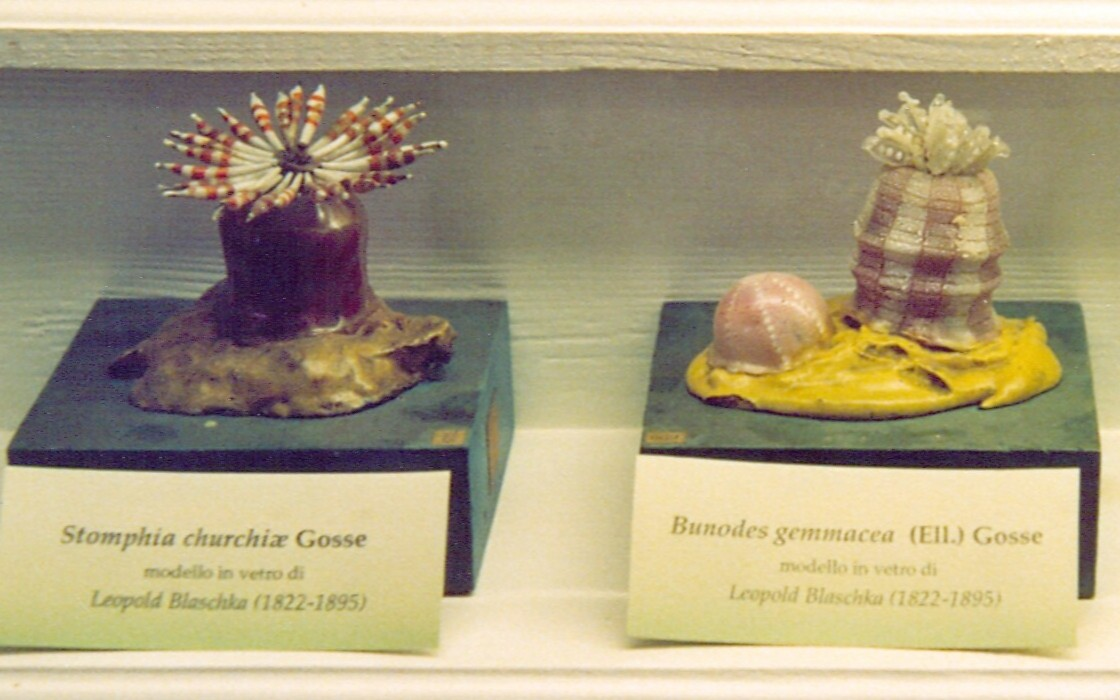
Blaschka model of sea anemones

In the 19th century, the only method practised for showcasing them was to take a live specimen and place it in a sealed jar of alcohol. This killed it, but more importantly, time and a lack of hard parts eventually rendered the specimen little more than a colorless floating blob of jelly, making it neither pretty nor an effective teaching tool. Prof. Reichenbach wanted something more, specifically three-dimensional, colored models of marine invertebrates that were both lifelike and able to endure. In 1863, he "saw an exhibition of highly detailed, realistic glass flowers created by a Bohemian lampworker, Leopold Blaschka, at an exhibition hosted by Prince Camille de Rohan;" and the Prince was who first introduced Reichenbach to Leopold Blaschka.

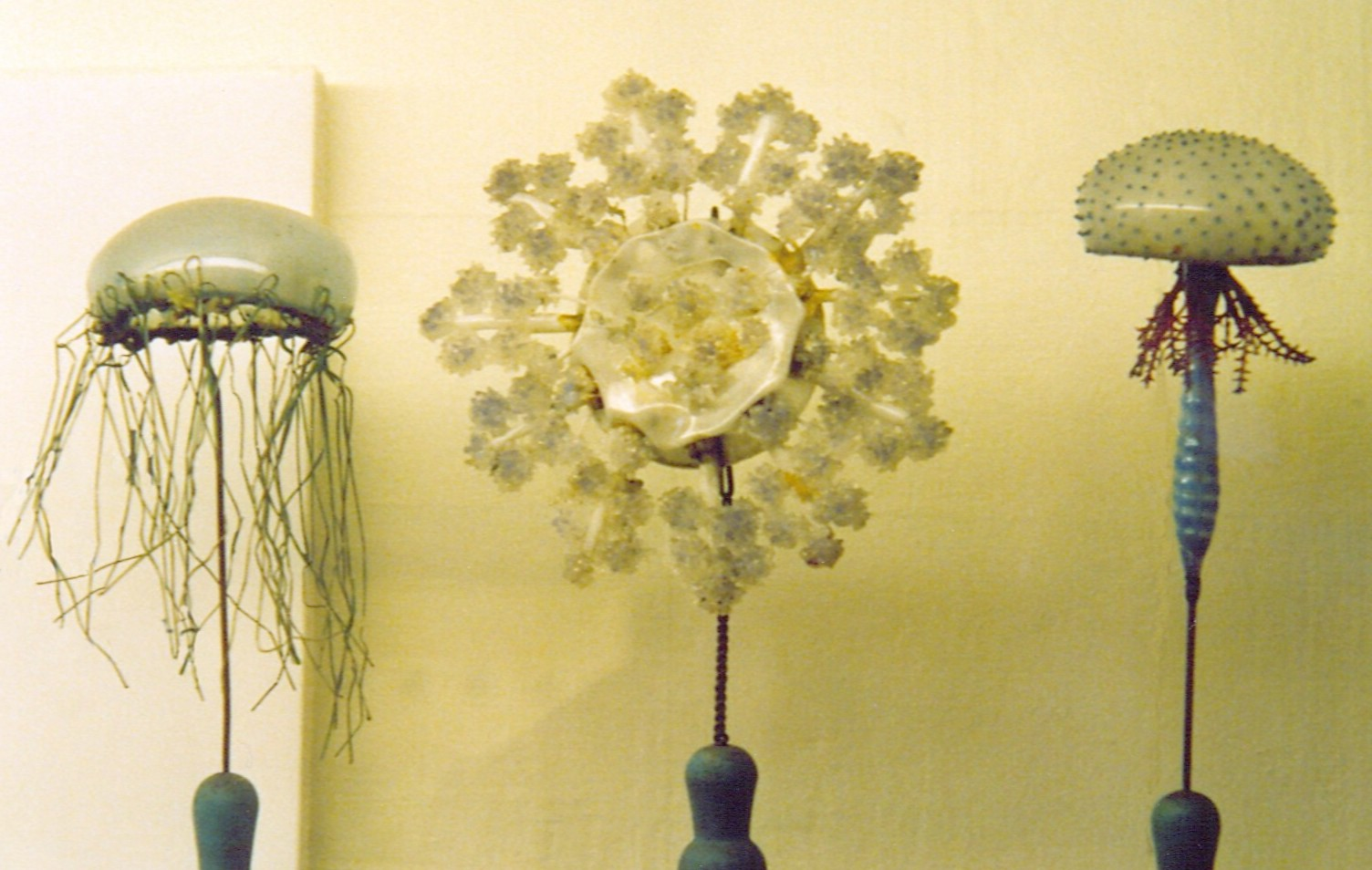
Blaschka model of jellyfish

Enchanted by the botanical models and positive that Leopold held the key to ending his own showcasing issue, in 1863 Reichenbach convinced and commissioned Leopold to produce 12 model sea anemones. These marine models, hailed as "an artistic marvel in the field of science and a scientific marvel in the field of art," were exactly what Prof. Reichenbach needed and, at last, provided an outlet for the wonder Leopold had felt all those years ago when observing the phosphorescent ocean life. The key fact, though, was that these glass marine models were, as would soon be acknowledged, "perfectly true to nature," and as such represented an extraordinary opportunity both for the scientific community and the Blaschkas themselves. Knowing this and thrilled with his newly acquired set of glass sea creatures, Reichenbach advised Leopold to drop his current and generations-long family business of glass fancy goods and the like in favor of selling glass marine invertebrates to museums, aquaria, universities, and private collectors. This advice later proved wise and fateful both economically and scientifically, for Leopold did as the Dresden natural history museum director suggested, a decision which swiftly sparked the Blaschkas' highly lucrative mail-order business of selling glass sea creatures to interested parties across the globe. Poetically, though Reichenbach did not know it, many years later, his showcasing problem and manner of finding the Blaschkas would be repeated by Harvard Professor George Lincoln Goodale - Goodale getting the idea for the creation of the Glass Flowers from Harvard's own collection of Glass sea creatures.

The original six glass sea anemones purchased by Ludwig Reichenbach in 1863, as well as the rest of that first collection, were destroyed in the bombing of Dresden in World War II.

== Later career ==
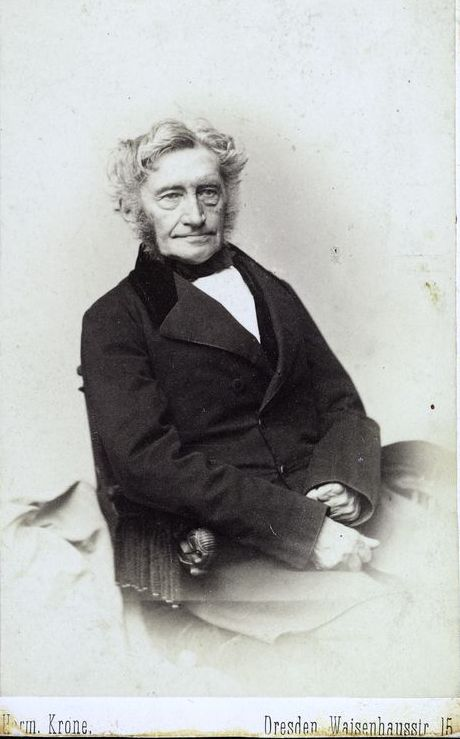

He was later the founder of the Dresden Botanical Gardens and joint founder of Dresden Zoo. The museum's zoological collection was almost completely destroyed by the fire in the Zwinger Palace during the constitutional crisis of 1849, but Reichenbach was able to replace it within only a few years. This collection is the basis of that seen in the museum today. Reichenbach was a prolific author and able botanical artist. His works included Iconographia Botanica seu Plantae criticae (1823–32, 10 vols.) and Handbuch der speciellen Ornithologie (1851–54).

=== Honors ===
He was honoured by having several plants and animals named after him, including Iris reichenbachii Heuff., Viola reichenbachiana Jord. ex Bor. (syn. V. sylvatica (Hartm.) Fr. ex Hartm. and V. sylvestris Lam. p.p.) (the slender wood violet). Dr. Reichenbach oversaw a world-famous botanical garden in Dresden with a great collection of cacti, and Echinocactus reichenbachii a beautiful cactus of the south-central U.S. and northern Mexico was named in his honour. Reichenbach's sunbird (Anabathmis reichenbachii) is also named after him. This botanist is denoted by the author abbreviation Rchb. when citing a botanical name. Finally, he was also the father of Heinrich Gustav Reichenbach, equally a botanist and an eminent orchid specialist.

== Death ==
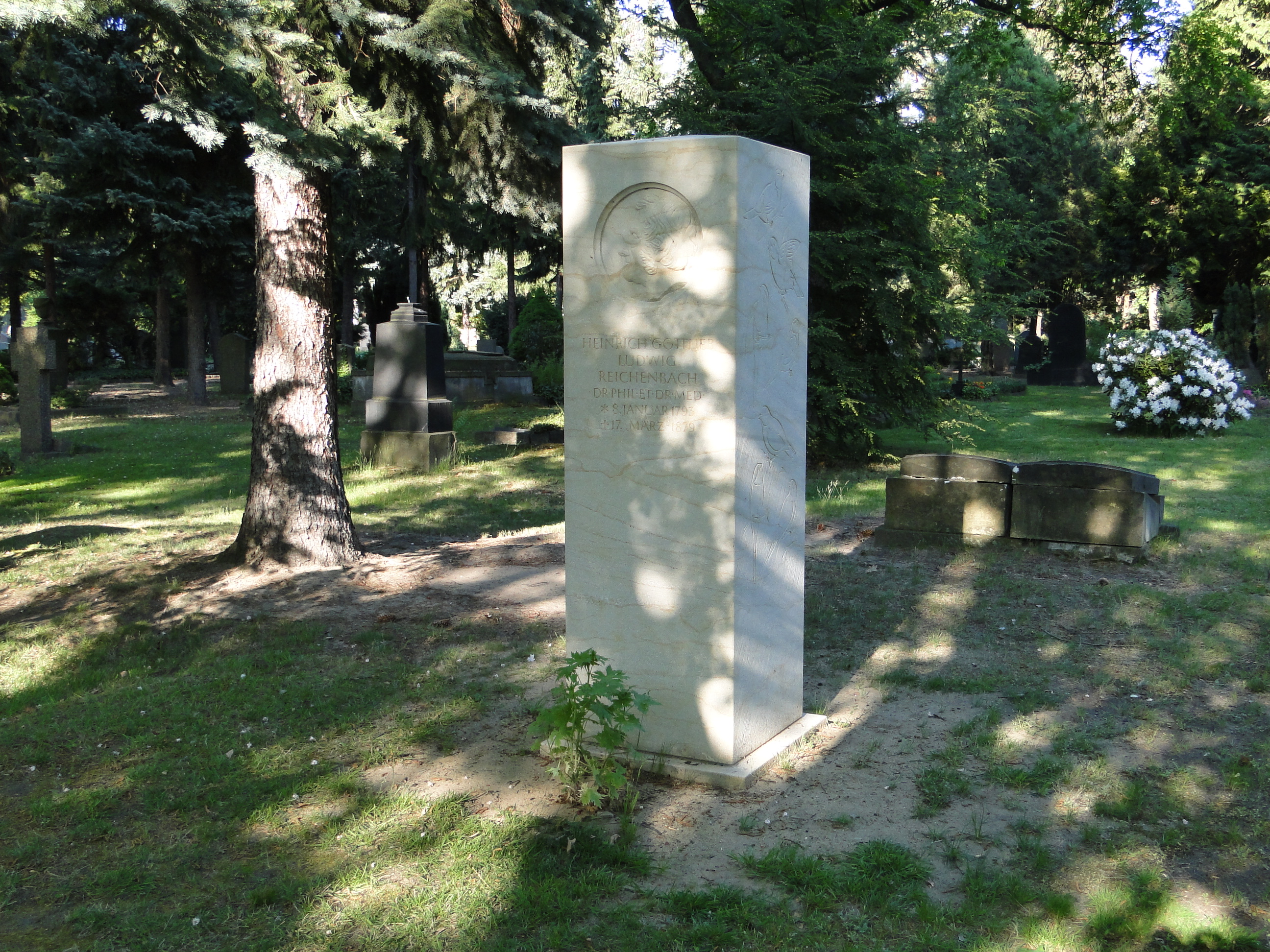
Memorial to Ludwig Reichenbach at the Trinitatisfriedhof in Dresden

Reichenbach died in 1879 and was interred in the Trinity Cemetery in Dresden Johannstadt. The tomb, however, was cleared after abandoning the right to use. However, the cemetery administration had not awarded the grave site, so that at the initiative of the Senckenberg Natural History Collections in Dresden, a stele was erected, which was unveiled on September 11, 2011.

== Publications ==
- Lepidoptera Jenaische Allgemeine Literatur-Zeitung (1817)
- Reichenbach, Heinrich Gottlieb Ludwig (1828). Conspectus regni vegetabilis per gradus naturales evoluti (in Latin). Leipzig: Carolum Cnobloch.
- Flora germanica excursoria (1830–32, 2 tomes)
- Flora exotica (1834–36)
- Flora germanica exsiccata (1830–45); Exsiccata
- Übersicht des Gewächsreichs und seiner natürlichen Entwickelungsstufen (1828)
- Handbuch des natürlichen Pflanzensystems (1837)
- Das Herbarienbuch (1841)
- Abbildung und Beschreibung der für Gartenkultur empfehlenswerten Gewächse (1821–26, with 96 plates)
- Monographia generis Aconiti (1820, with 19 plates)
- Illustratio specierum Aconiti generis (1823–27, with 72 plates)
- Iconographia botanica s. plantae criticae (1823-1832, with 1,000 plates)
- Iconographia botanica exotica (1827–30)
- Regnum animale (1834–36, with 79 plates)
- Deutschlands Fauna (1842, 2 tomes)
- Vollständigste Naturgeschichte des In- und Auslandes (1845–54, 2 volumes in 9 tomes with more than 1,000 plates)

== See also ==
- Category:Taxa named by Ludwig Reichenbach
