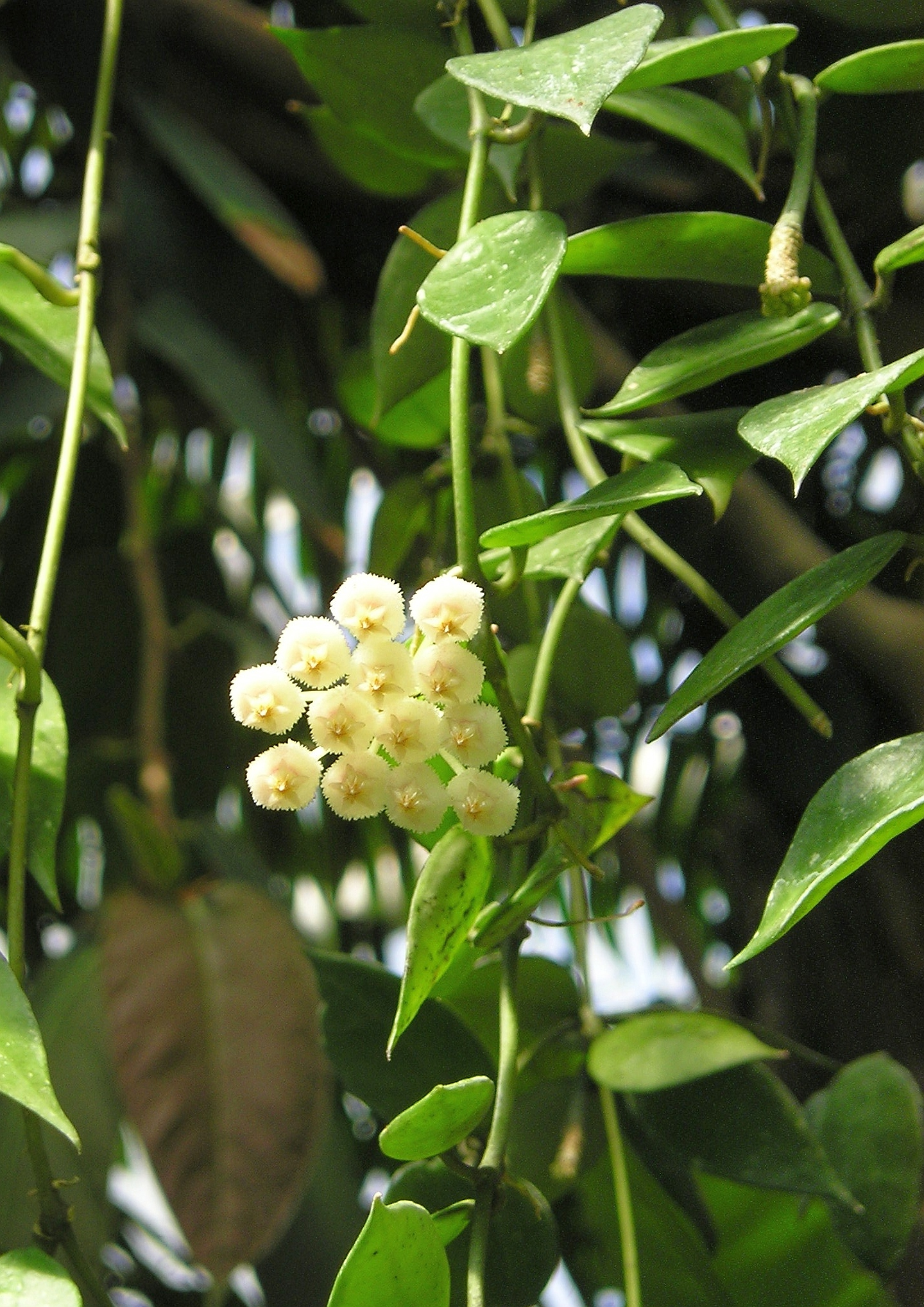
- Hoya lacunosa growing in the Dresden Botanical Garden

Scientific classification
- Kingdom: Plantae
- Clade: Tracheophytes
- Clade: Angiosperms
- Clade: Eudicots
- Clade: Asterids
- Order: Gentianales
- Family: Apocynaceae
- Genus: Hoya
- Species: H. lacunosa

Binomial name
- Hoya lacunosa Blume

= Hoya lacunosa =

Species of plant

Hoya lacunosa is a species of plant in the genus Hoya native to Southeast Asia.

== Distribution and habitat ==
Its native range is Thailand through Borneo, Java, Sumatra, and the Philippines, and it is introduced in other countries as well. Like most Hoya, it is an epiphytic vining climber. It has smooth ovate to lanceolate leaves, and flowers that are scented like cinnamon.
