= Kindereisenbahn =

Kindereisenbahn may refer to one of several children's railways in German speaking countries:

- Dresdner Kindereisenbahn
- Kindereisenbahn Košice

See also

- Children's railway
