= Großer Garten =

Park in Dresden, Germany

Coordinates: 51°02′15″N 13°45′47″E

Map of the park

The Großer Garten (English: Great Garden) is a Baroque style park in central Dresden. It is rectangular in shape and covers about 1.8 km^{2}. Originally established in 1676 on the orders of John George III, Elector of Saxony, it has been a public garden since 1814. Pathways and avenues are arranged symmetrically throughout the park. The Sommerpalais, a small Lustschloss is at the center of the park.

Originally established outside the old walls of the city, the park was surrounded by urban areas by the second half of the 19th century. Dresden Zoo and Dresden Botanical Garden were added late in the 19th century. A miniature railway, known as the Parkeisenbahn, operates in the park from April to October.

During World War II the Nazi Party banned Jews from entering Großer Garten, as well as other parks across Germany. After the war ended, the gardens were turned into vegetable plots.

Volkswagen's Transparent Factory is the newest building in the park, completed in 2002. It is on Straßburger Platz, in the northwest corner of the park.

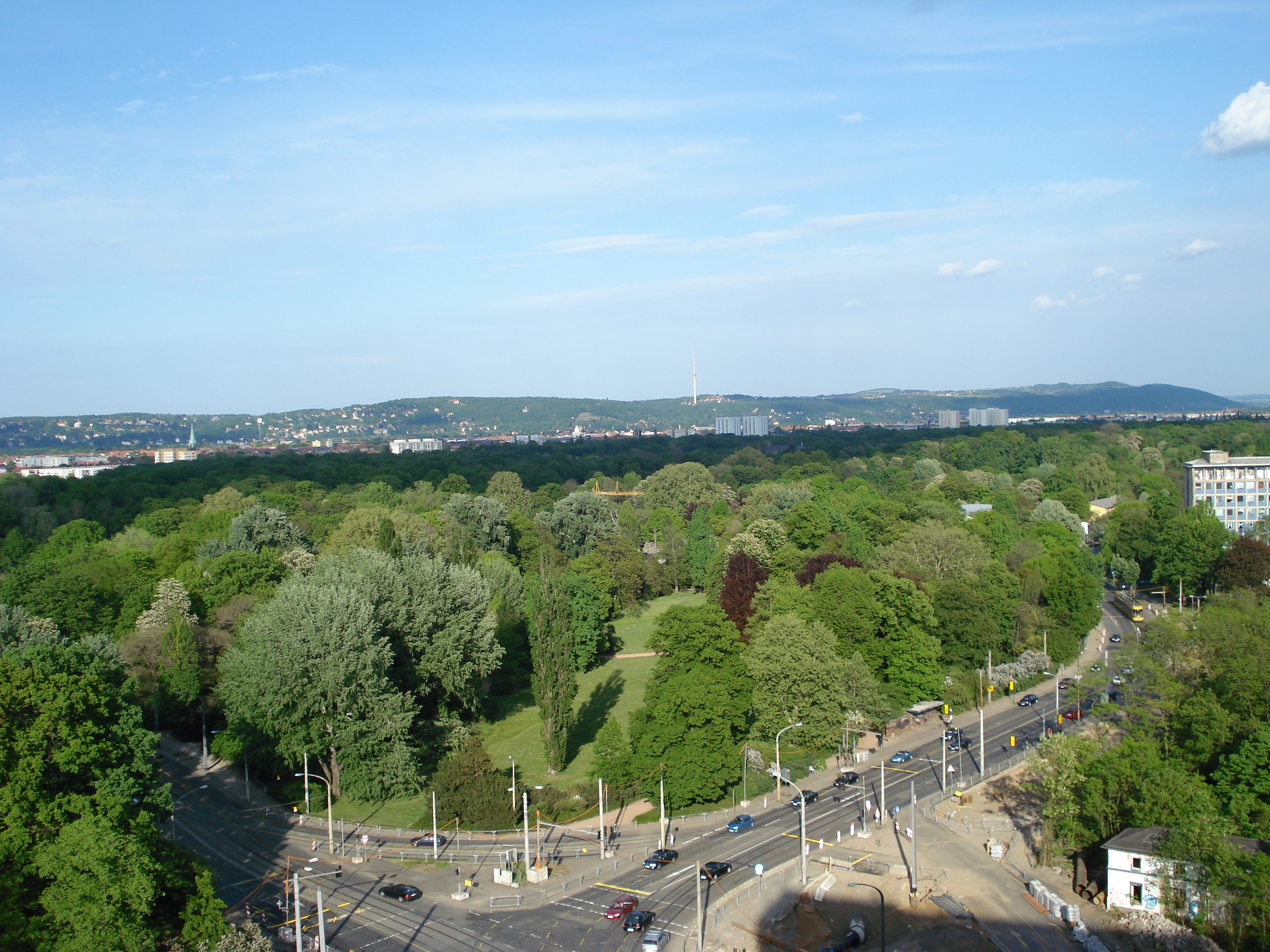
Park seen from the south-western corner

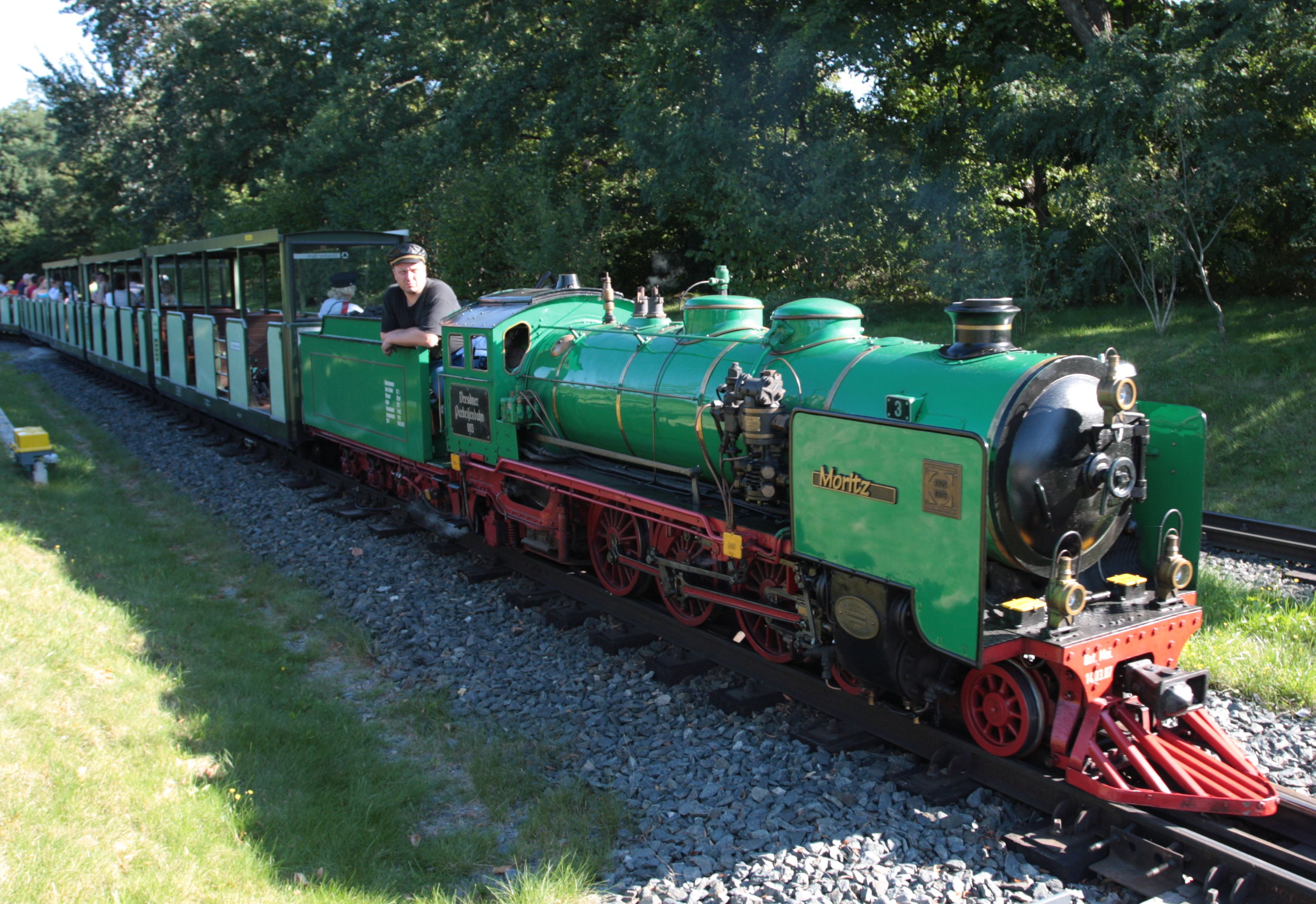
Park railway

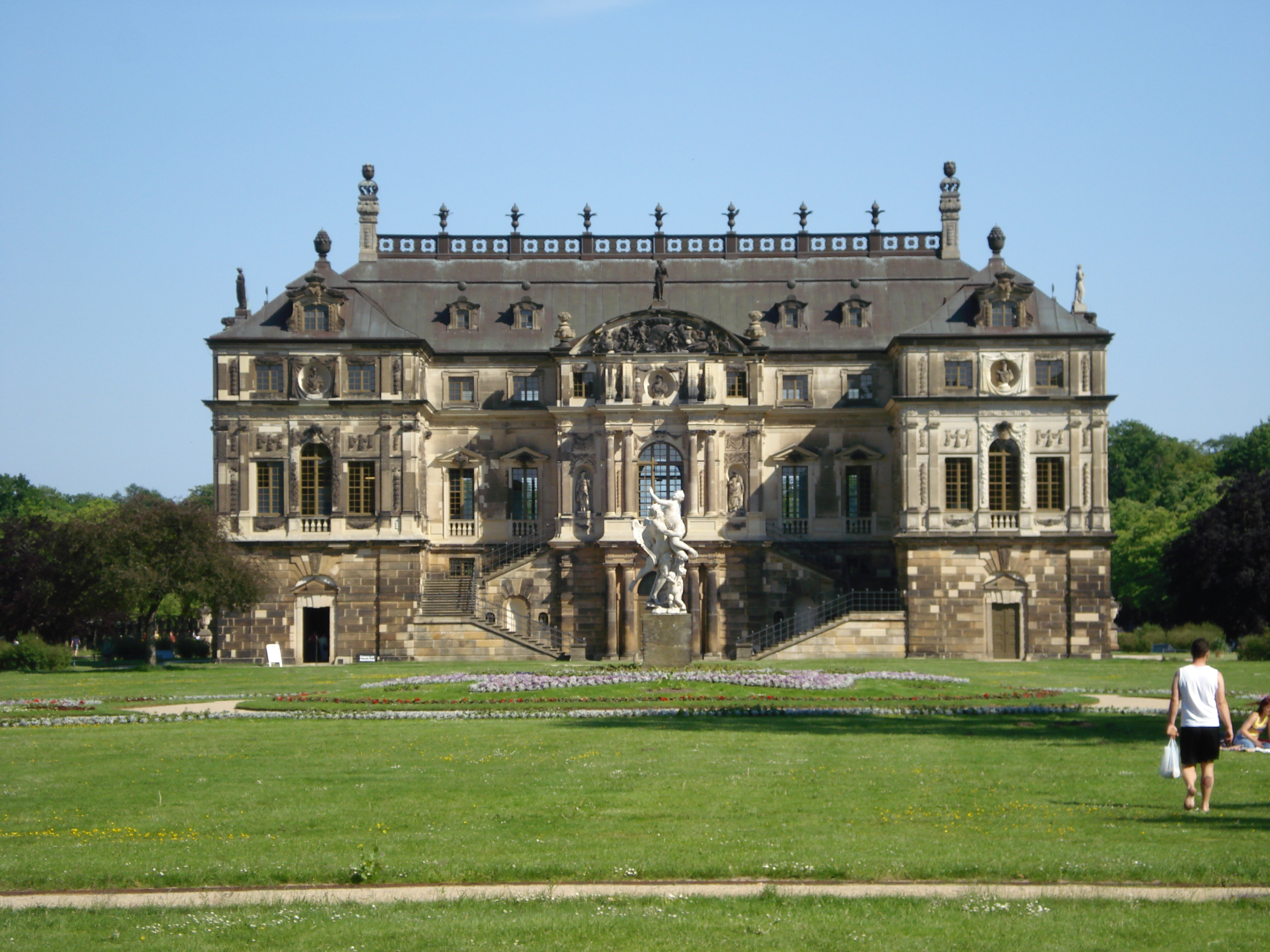
Sommerpalais

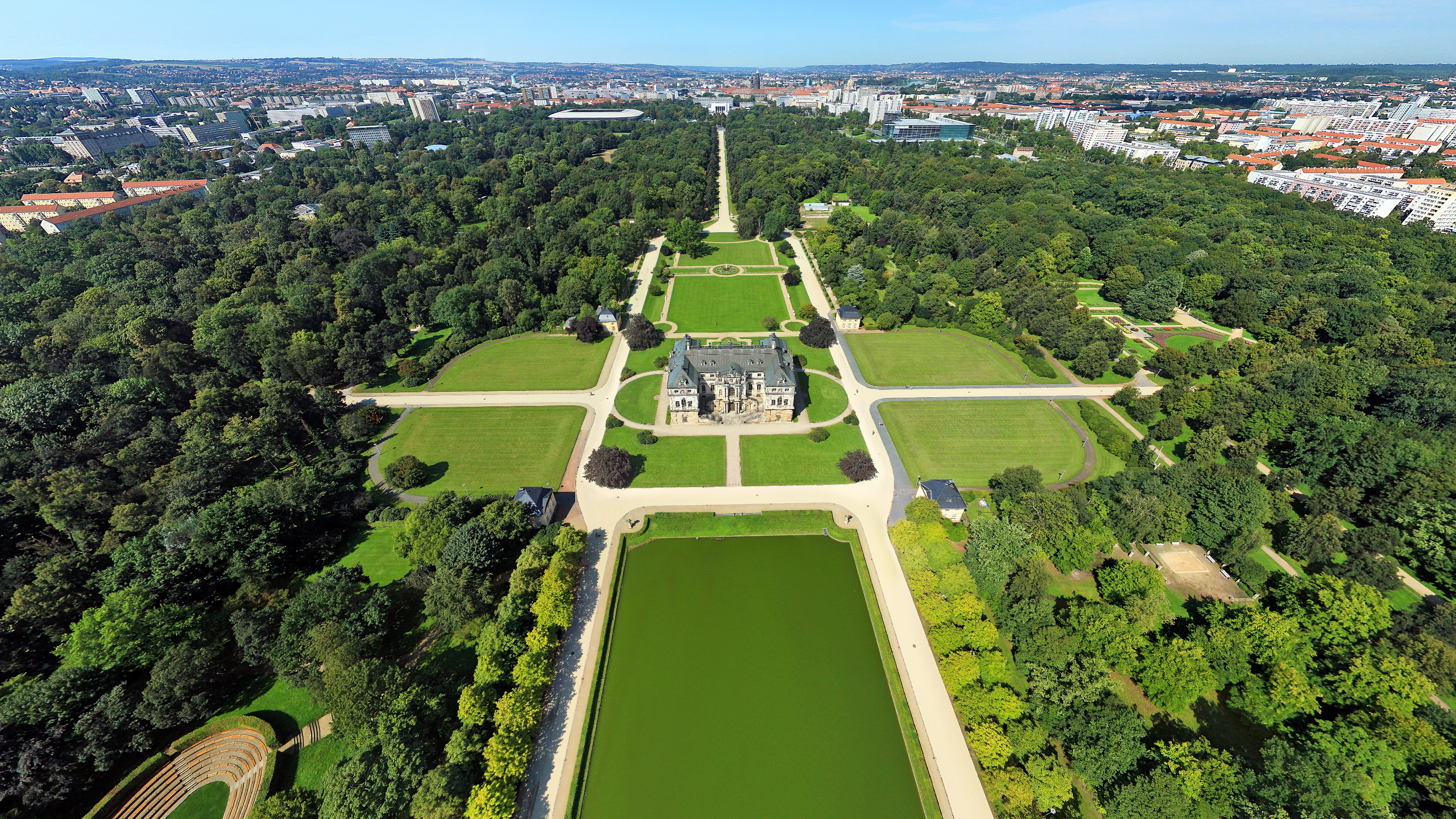
Aerial view

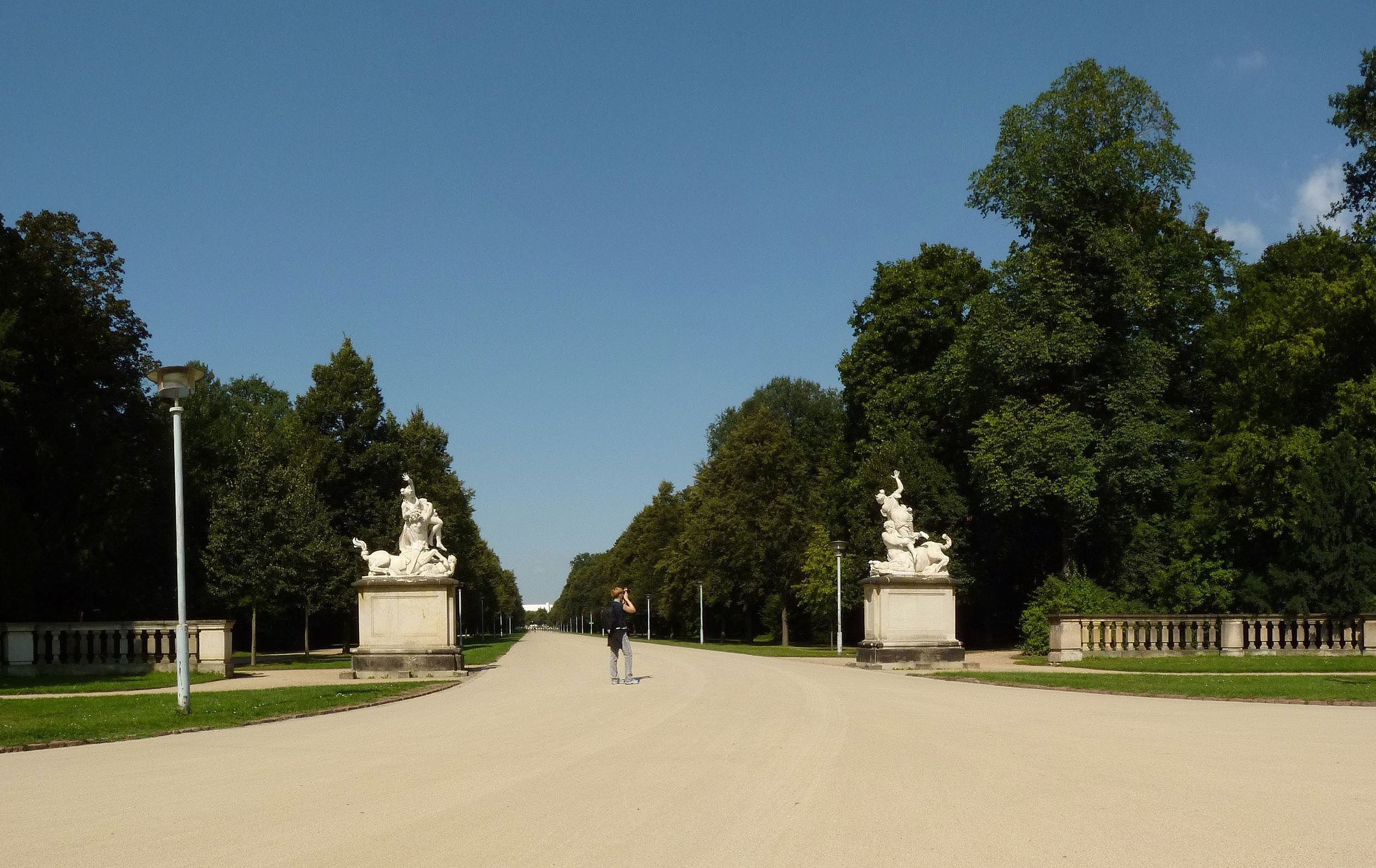
Main avenue through the park

== See also ==
- List of Baroque residences
- Dresden Heath, a large forest in Dresden
