= Dresden Park Railway =

Miniature railway in Dresden, Germany

Coordinates: 51°2′34″N 13°45′11″E

Dresden park railway
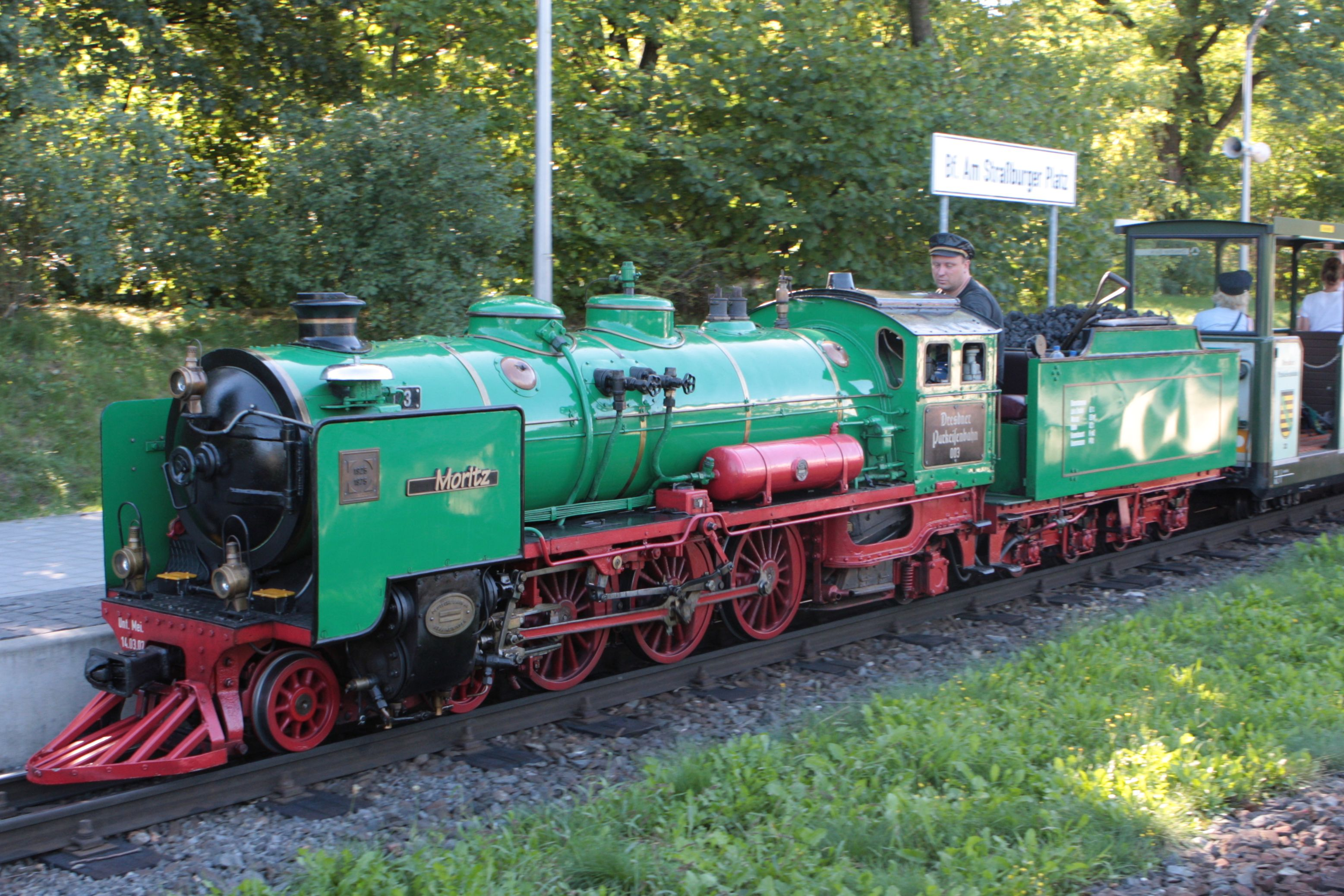
- Steam locomotive 003 (Moritz)

Overview
- Locale: Dresden
- Stations: 5

Service
- Type: Light railway
- Route number: 12249
- Operator(s): Staatliche Schlösser, Burgen und Gärten Sachsen gemeinnützige GmbH
- Depot(s): at Station Zoo

History
- Opened: 1950

Technical
- Line length: 5.6 km (3.5 mi)
- Track length: 7.2 km (4.5 mi)
- Track gauge: 381 mm (15 in)
- Operating speed: 20 km/h (12 mph)
Route map

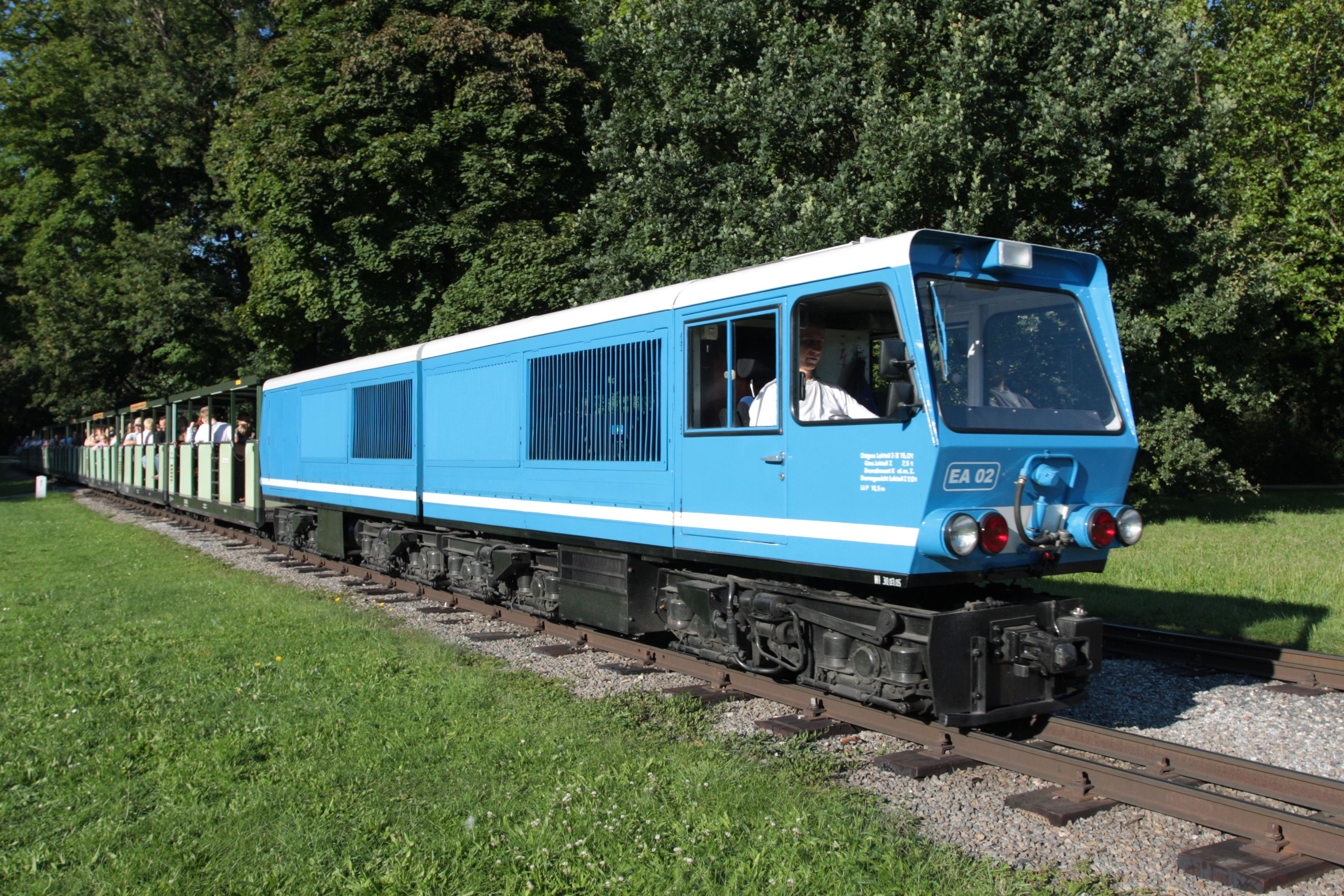
Battery-electric locomotive EA02

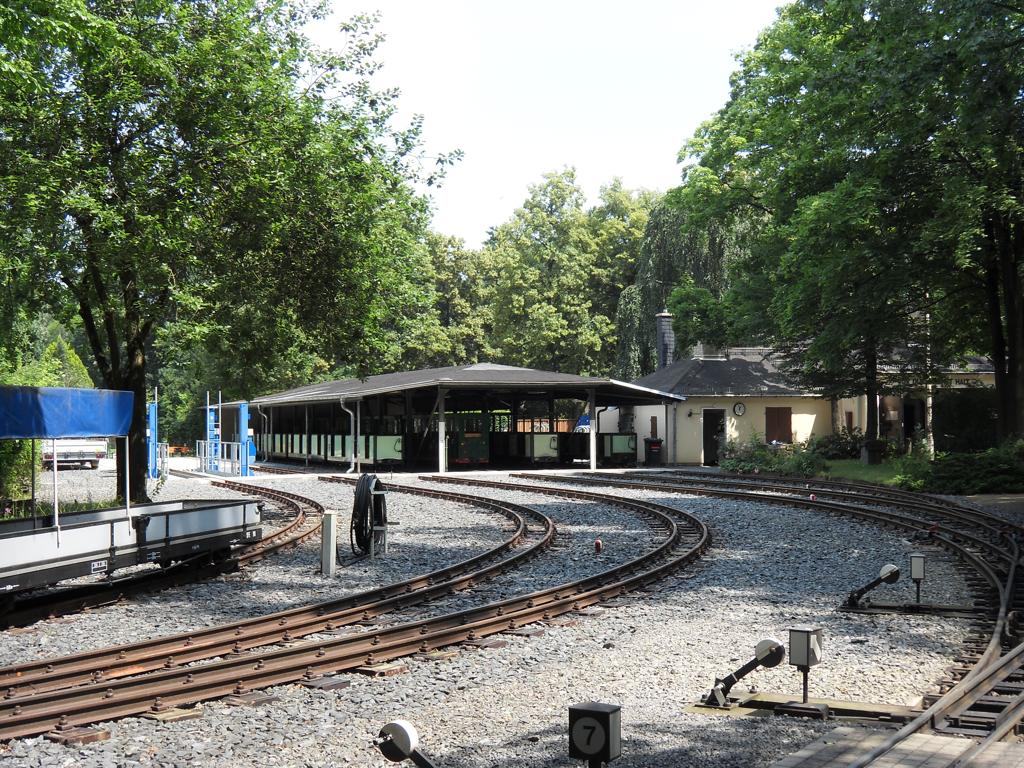
The Parkeisenbahn car sheds

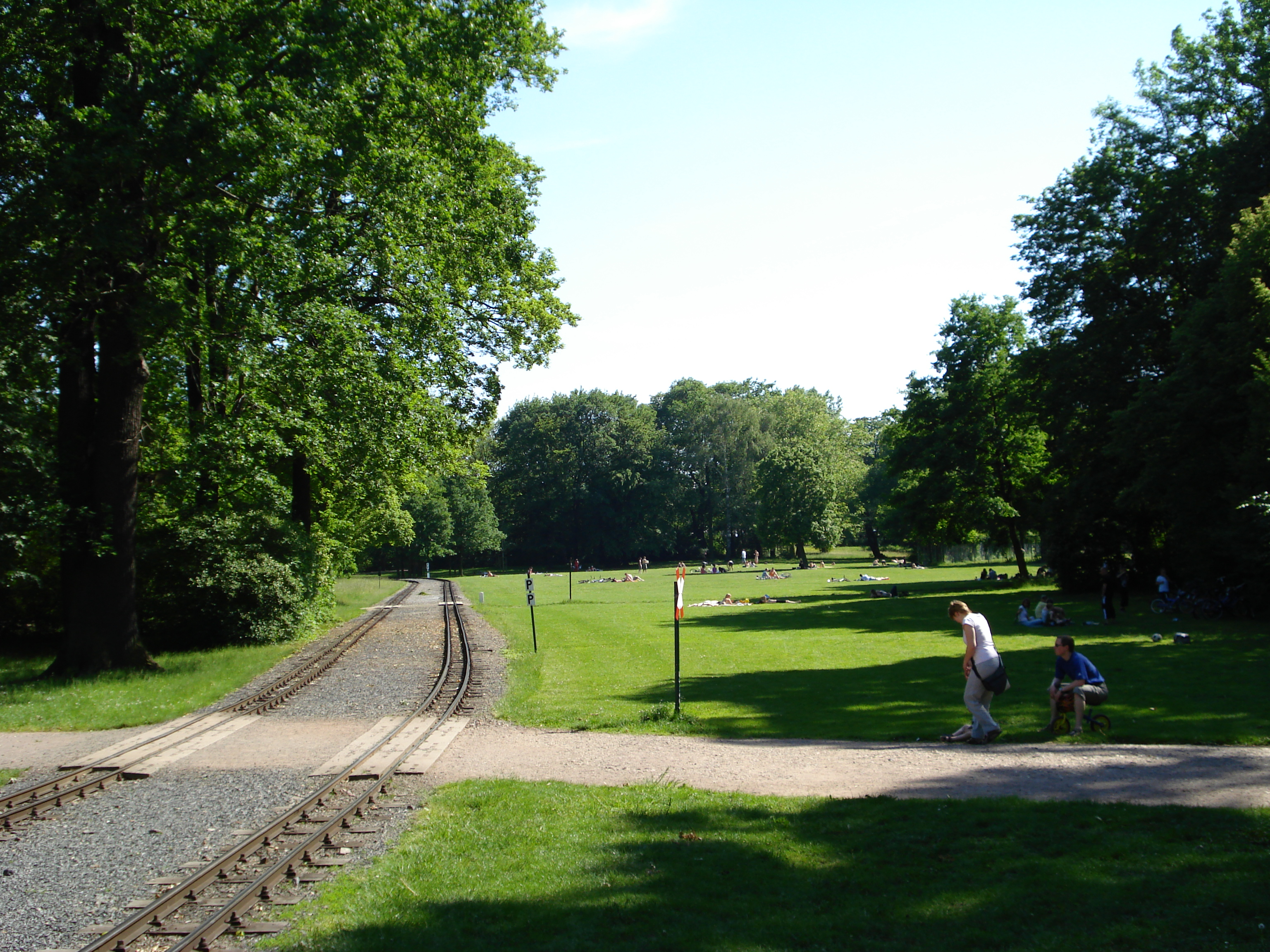
Double track section of line

The Dresden park railway (German: Dresdner Parkeisenbahn) is a 381 mm (15 in) minimum-gauge railway in Dresden, Germany. The line opened in 1950 and was previously known as the Kindereisenbahn and the Pioniereisenbahn. As these names suggest, the line is largely operated by children, and is a survivor of the many children's railways that were built in the former Eastern Bloc countries. The railway operates within the Großer Garten, a large city centre park.

== History ==
In 1925, a series of three identical 381 mm (15 in) gauge miniature steam locomotives and matching trains were designed by the engineer Roland Martens, following a study trip to England. The locomotives were based on full-sized Pacific locomotives of the Deutsche Reichsbahn, and built by Krauss & Co., who subsequently went on to build 15 locomotives of this type, most of which are still in use on various miniature railways around the world. Originally, the three locomotives were used on temporary tracks at various trade fairs or exhibitions, the first of which was the 1925 German Transport Exhibition in Munich.

In 1930, 1931, 1936 and 1937, Dresden hosted exhibitions at which the Martens locomotives and trains operated. Trains ran between the exhibition grounds, on the site now occupied by the Gläserne Manufaktur, and the Großer Garten. However, like the other exhibition lines, the line was only ever of a temporary nature and was dismantled at the end of each exhibition. During the Second World War, the trains were stored in a quarry near Kamenz and thus preserved.

In June 1950, the railway was reinstated to commemorate International Children's Day, using two of the 1925-built locomotives and eight of the passenger cars of the earlier lines. Initially it was known as the Kindereisenbahn and had one 1.3 kilometres (0.81 mi) long track, between Zoo and Stübelplatz (which later became Fučíkplatz and then later still Straßburger Platz), with turning loops at both stations. The line was only planned to last a few weeks, and in July the locomotives and wagons had to be handed over to a horticultural exhibition in Erfurt. However the line in Erfurt did not prove to be a success, and the rolling stock was returned to Dresden in October.

The children's railway was very popular with young and old in the still largely ruined city of Dresden. A delegation travelled to Berlin in the summer of 1950 to request that the railway be permitted to remain permanently, a request that was granted. In 1951 the line renamed the as Pioniereisenbahn; it was owned by Dresden City Council, but operated by the pioneer movement as the DDR's first pioneer railway. In the same year, the track was extended to 4.4 kilometres (2.7 mi), running from Zoo via Carolasee and Palaisteich back to Zoo. Later in the year the station Karcherallee was opened and the line reached its current length of 5.6 kilometres (3.5 mi).

In 1962, a battery electric locomotive and ten passenger cars were added to the vehicle fleet. In 1968 the track between Zoo and Fučíkplatz was doubled, and in the following years eleven new passenger cars were added. In 1982 a further train, comprising a second battery electric locomotive and eight passenger cars were added to the fleet.

In 1990, after German reunification, the railway was renamed as the Parkeisenbahn. In 1993, ownership of the line was transferred to the state of Saxony. In 2000, the construction of the new Gläserne Manufaktur meant that the station at Straßburger Platz had to be relocated. The new station was opened in 2000, and subsequently renamed An der Gläsernen Manufaktur.

== Operation ==
The railway operates from April to October. It is some 5.6 kilometres (3.5 mi) long and attracts approximately 250 000 visitors every year.

The line starts from An der Gläsernen Manufaktur station, which takes its name from the adjacent Gläserne Manufaktur, a Volkswagen car factory. From here to Zoo station the line is double track, and served by trains in both directions. Zoo station takes its name from the nearby Dresden Zoo and is the headquarters of the line, with locomotive and car sheds. Beyond Zoo station, trains normally operate on a one-way single track loop via stations at Carolasee, Karcherallee and Palaisteich, before returning to Zoo station. A shorter loop is also available that omits Karcherallee station, but this is rarely used.

Trains are run by a team of 4 full-time adult employees, with some 50 seasonal and part-time staff, supporting a large number of teenagers trained to operate services (165 young people, as of 2009). During the winter months, the children are trained in their tasks for the forthcoming summer.

== Rolling stock ==
=== Resident locomotives ===
Locomotive Number	Locomotive Name	Locomotive Type	Year Built	Builder	Notes	Rf.
Steam Locomotives
001	Lisa	4-6-2	1925	Krauss & Co., Munich	Original locomotive. Builder number: 8351.	
003	Moritz	4-6-2	1925	Krauss & Co., Munich	Original locomotive. Builder number: 8353.	
Electric Locomotives
EA01			1962	Deutsche Reichsbahn, Dresden	Battery electric locomotive.	
EA02		1A-A1+1A-A1	1982	Deutsche Reichsbahn, Dresden	Battery electric double locomotive.	
Petrol Locomotive
SKL-1		0-4-0PM	1997	Local conversion	Track inspection locomotive, converted from a road moped.	

=== Visiting locomotives ===
In October 1998, the steam locomotives River Mite and Northern Rock, together with the diesel Cyril, visited from the Ravenglass and Eskdale Railway, in the English Lake District. The two steam locomotives operated passenger trains on the railway, although Northern Rock was limited by its inability to pass through the station at Strassburger Platz. Cyril operated a demonstration freight train.

In May 2003, and again in June 2010, locomotive 002 from the Leipzig Park Railway visited and operated trains. Leipzig 002 is an identical sister locomotive to Dresden's two steam locomotives, and these visits brought back together the three original Roland Martens designed and Krauss built locomotives of 1925.

=== Other rolling stock ===
The line has 35 passenger cars in total. There are 19 open cars, of which two date back to the original stock built in 1925 to run with locomotives 001 and 003, with the remainder built in various batches between 1960 and 1996. There are also 12 open sided cars with a roof, which were converted from open cars starting in 1998. Finally there are four enclosed cars that were built in 1996 by Winson Engineering in the UK and are equipped with heating for use in winter.

There are also a number of ancillary vehicles.

== See also ==
- Fifteen-inch–gauge railway
