= Henn GmbH =

Architecture firm

- Industry: Architecture
- Founded: 1979; 47 years ago in Munich, Germany
- Founder: Gunter Henn
- Headquarters: Munich, Germany
- Key people: Managing Directors: Tanja Dietsch, Marcus Fißan, Martin Henn, Stefan Sinning, Werner Sonnleitner, Advisory Board: Gunter Henn
- Number of employees: 380
- Website: henn.com

Henn is an international architecture firm based in Munich, Germany. It draws on expertise in the fields of work space, work culture, education and research, as well as in production and master planning, and is best known for its office buildings and industrial structures. Since 2021, the company has been run by Martin Henn, the grandson of its founder, in conjunction with three other managing directors and seventeen partners. A total of 380 employees work in the fields of architecture, interior design, planning and engineering.

== History ==
The company was created in 1979 by Gunter Henn in Munich and is the successor to the company of Walter Henn, who was still active as an office partner until 1989 (Henn + Henn Architekten). The company has been operating as Henn GmbH since 2013. Since 2021, Gunter Henn has been a member of the company's advisory board.

== Profile ==
Innovation centres and working spaces in the tech and science sectors have been realised for Zalando in Berlin, Merck in Darmstadt, HVB and Osram in Munich, China Life and Taikang Life in Beijing and have attracted global attention. HENN has also built for numerous clients in the automotive sector, such as the BMW FIZ Future in Munich, the VW Autostadt with the Porsche Pavilion in Wolfsburg and the Transparent Factory in Dresden. In the field of education and research, the Robert Koch Institute in Berlin, Roche in Penzberg, the Nanopolis Science City in Suzhou, the ARENA 2036 in Stuttgart, the Faculty of Mechanical Engineering at TUM in Munich and the master plan for the Inselspital in Bern have all had a significant impact on their respective locations. Ongoing projects of the office are the Gasteig in Munich, The Cube in Dresden and the Westlake University in Hangzhou.

The range of activities includes Programming (design strategy), architectural design, interior design, urban design and master planning, quantity surveying, construction management, and sustainability.

Henn GmbH ranks 41 on the list of the 100 architecture firms with the highest global turnover and 17 on the list of European top 50 architecture firms.

== Images ==
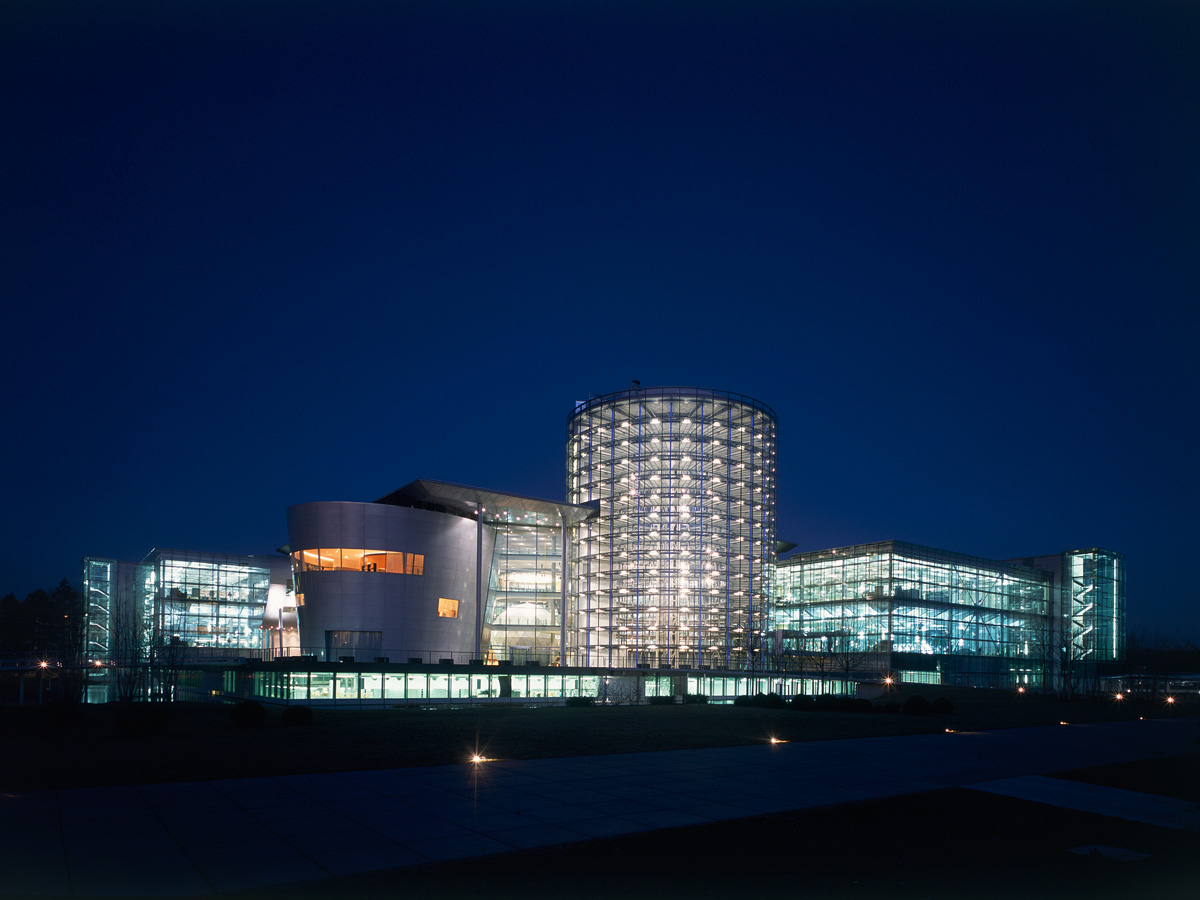
Gläserne Manufaktur in Dresden

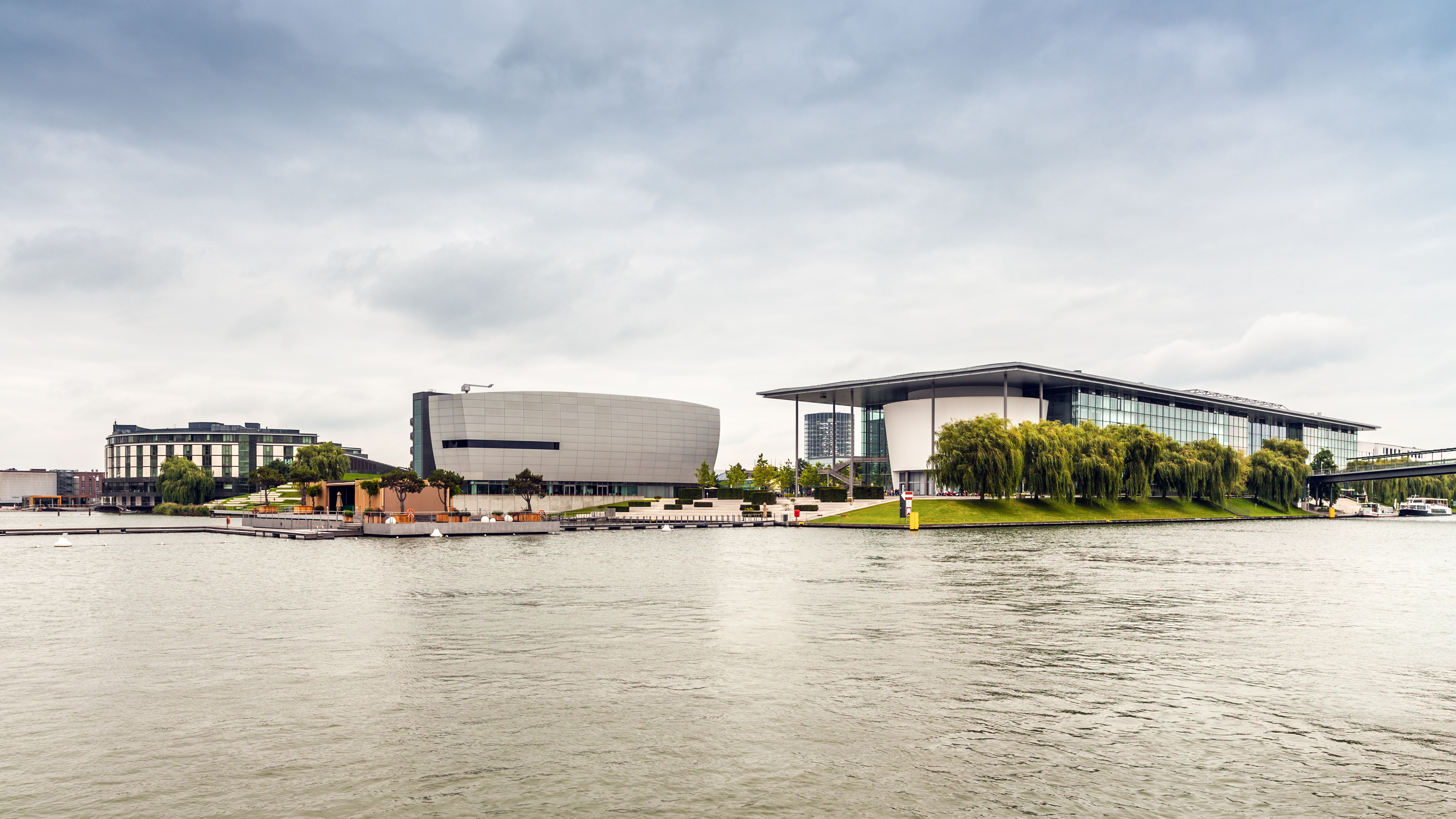
Autostadt in Wolfsburg

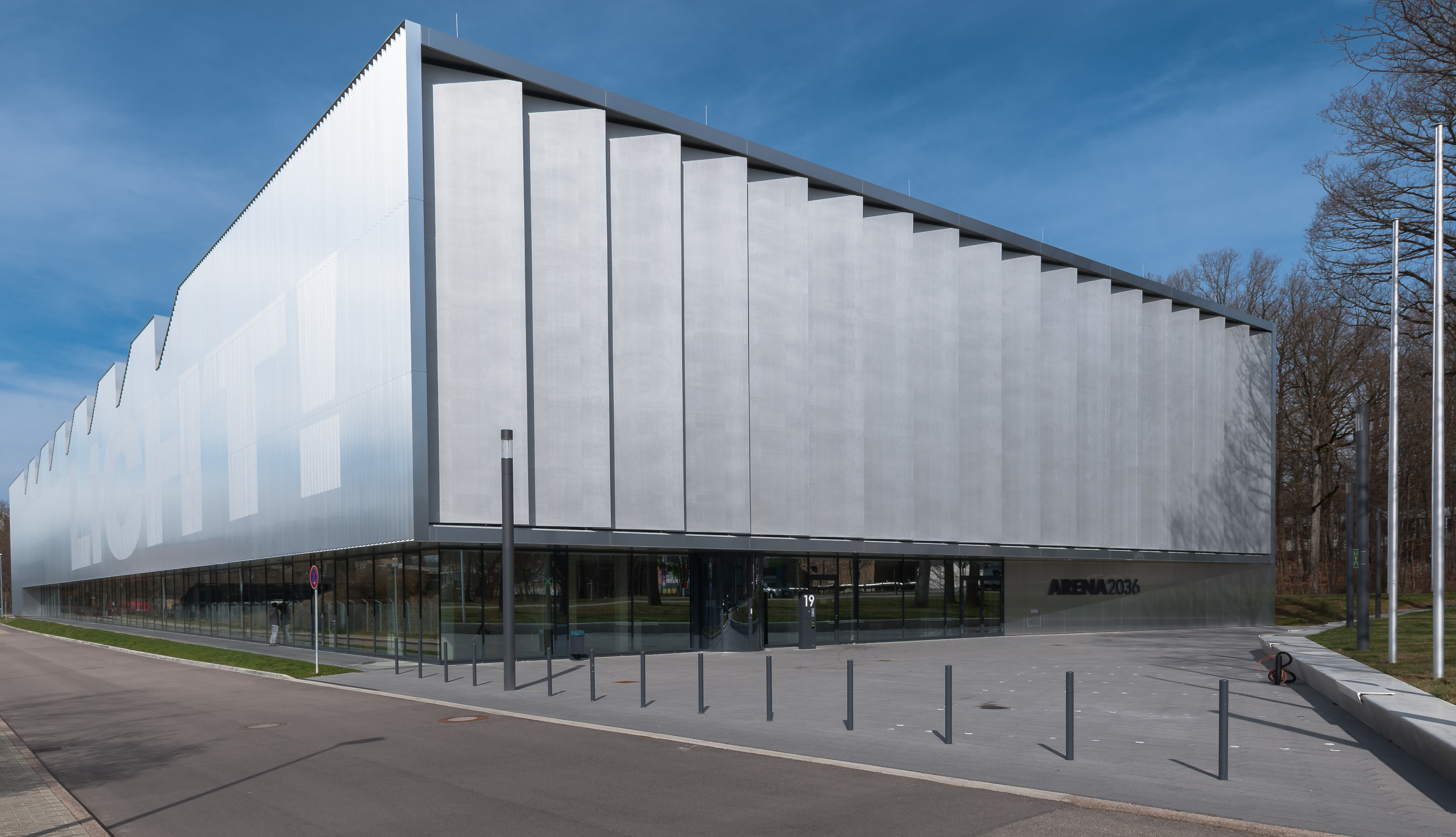
ARENA2036 in Stuttgart
