= Dresden Zoo =

Animal park in Saxony, Germany

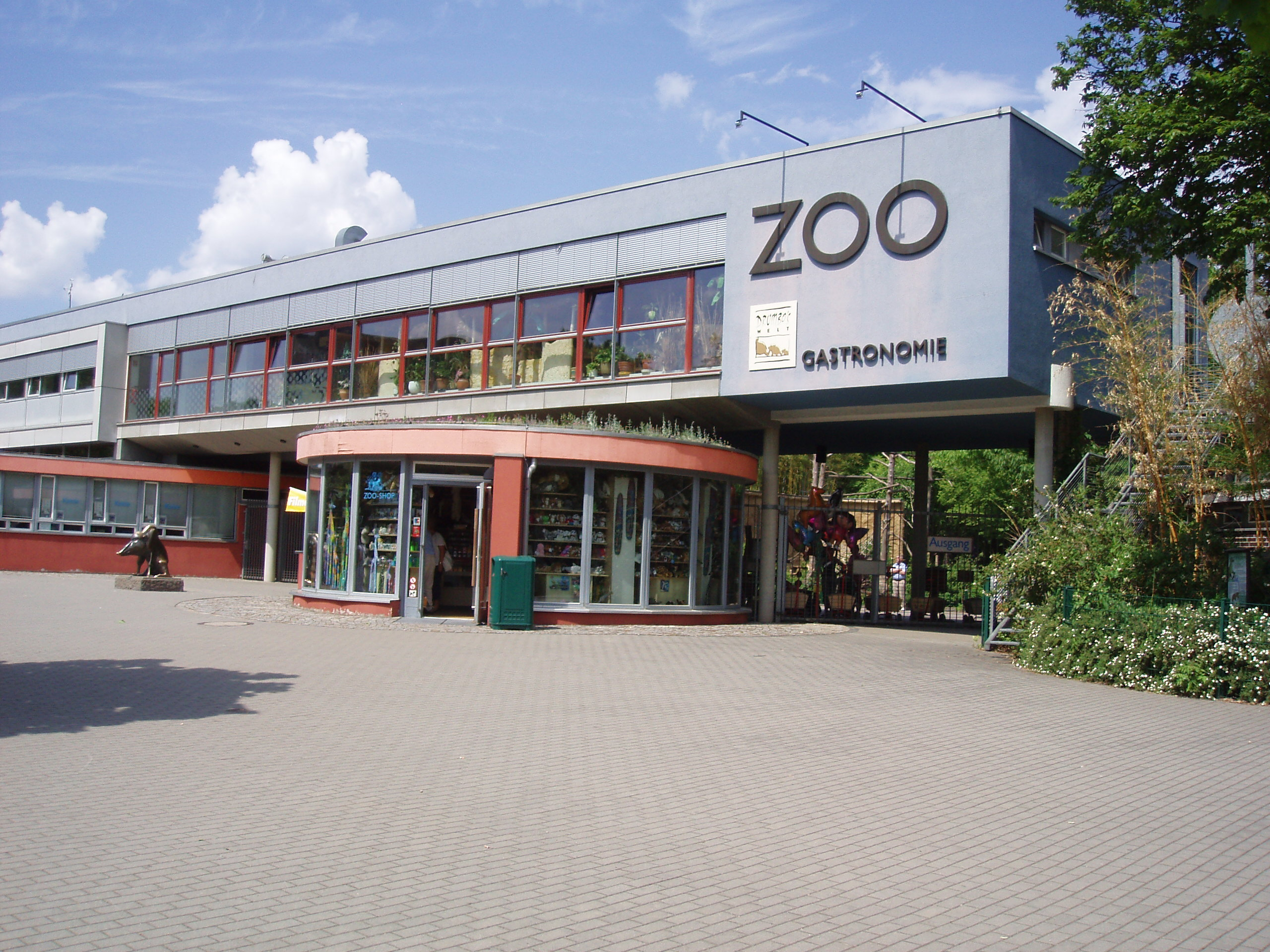
- Gate at Dresden Zoo
- Interactive map of Dresden Zoo
- 51.0374°N 13.7539°E
- Date opened: 1861
- Location: Dresden, Free State of Saxony, Germany
- Land area: 13 hectares (32 acres)
- No. of animals: 3000
- No. of species: 400
- Memberships: WAZA, EAZA, VDZ
- Major exhibits: Africa House, Lion & Caracal Enclosure, Aquarium and Terrarium, Giraffe House, Birds, Prof. Brandes House, Orangutans, The Zoo Below the Ground
- Website: www.zoo-dresden.de

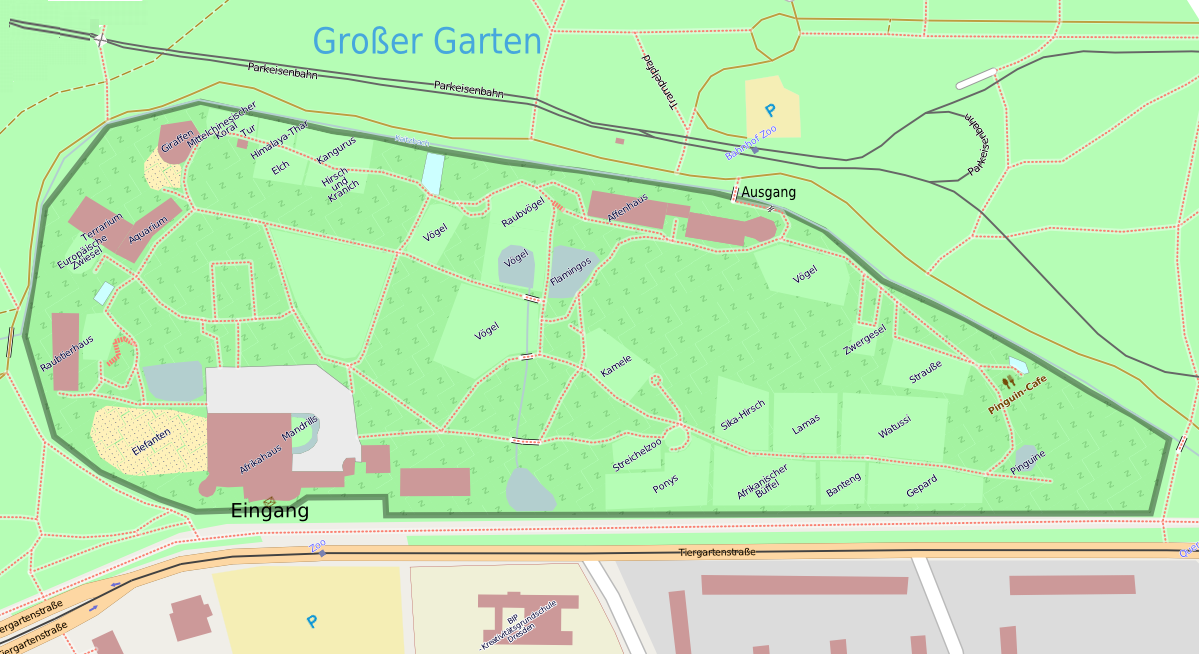
Map of Dresden Zoo

Dresden Zoo, or Zoo Dresden, is a zoo in the city of Dresden, Germany. It opened in 1861, making it Germany's fourth-oldest zoo. It was originally designed by Peter Joseph Lenné.

The zoo is located on the southern edge of the Großer Garten (Great Garden), a large city centre park. The zoo houses about 3000 animals of almost 400 species, especially Asian animals. It is a member of the World Association of Zoos and Aquariums (WAZA) and the European Association of Zoos and Aquaria (EAZA).

The zoo is served on its southern side by tram lines 9 and 13 of the Dresdner Verkehrsbetriebe, the local municipal transport company. On its northern side is the Zoo station of the Dresdner Parkeisenbahn, a minimum-gauge railway through the Großer Garten that is largely operated by children.

== In literature ==
At the end of the short story Tobermory (1909) by Saki, the visiting Englishman Cornelius Appin is killed by an elephant at the Dresden Zoological Garden.

In the novel Extremely Loud & Incredibly Close (2005) by Jonathan Safran Foer, Thomas Schell is told to shoot all of the carnivores that had escaped from their cages during Dresden's bombing of World War II. He didn't know which were carnivorous and which weren't, so he was told to kill them all. The animals he killed included an elephant, an ape, two lions, a bear cub, a camel, a rhinoceros, a zebra, a giraffe, and a sea lion.

== History ==
In 1859, at the suggestion of the Dresden "Association for Chicken Breeding", a committee was formed which, in collaboration with the city administration, initiated the establishment of a zoo. Peter Joseph Lenné acted as landscape architect and the architect Carl Adolph Canzler was responsible for all of the zoo's buildings. King Johann made part of the royal Great Garden available. After two years of construction, the zoo was opened on May 9, 1861. The zoo's first director was Albin Schoepf, who built the zoo with the help of his son and later director Adolph Schoepf. Since 1873, the Dresden Zoo has cared for great apes, especially orangutans, with which the zoo gained worldwide attention in 1927. For the first time, the growth of an orangutan and its natural rearing by its mother were observed and documented. From 1910 to 1934, Gustav Brandes was in charge of the zoo and laid the foundations for a modern zoo. He restructured the zoo from a pure animal show to a species-appropriate environment in which animals were kept in a natural environment.

== See also ==
- List of zoos in Germany
