= Transparent Factory =

Car factory and exhibition space in Dresden, Germany

Coordinates: 51°02′40″N 13°45′20″E

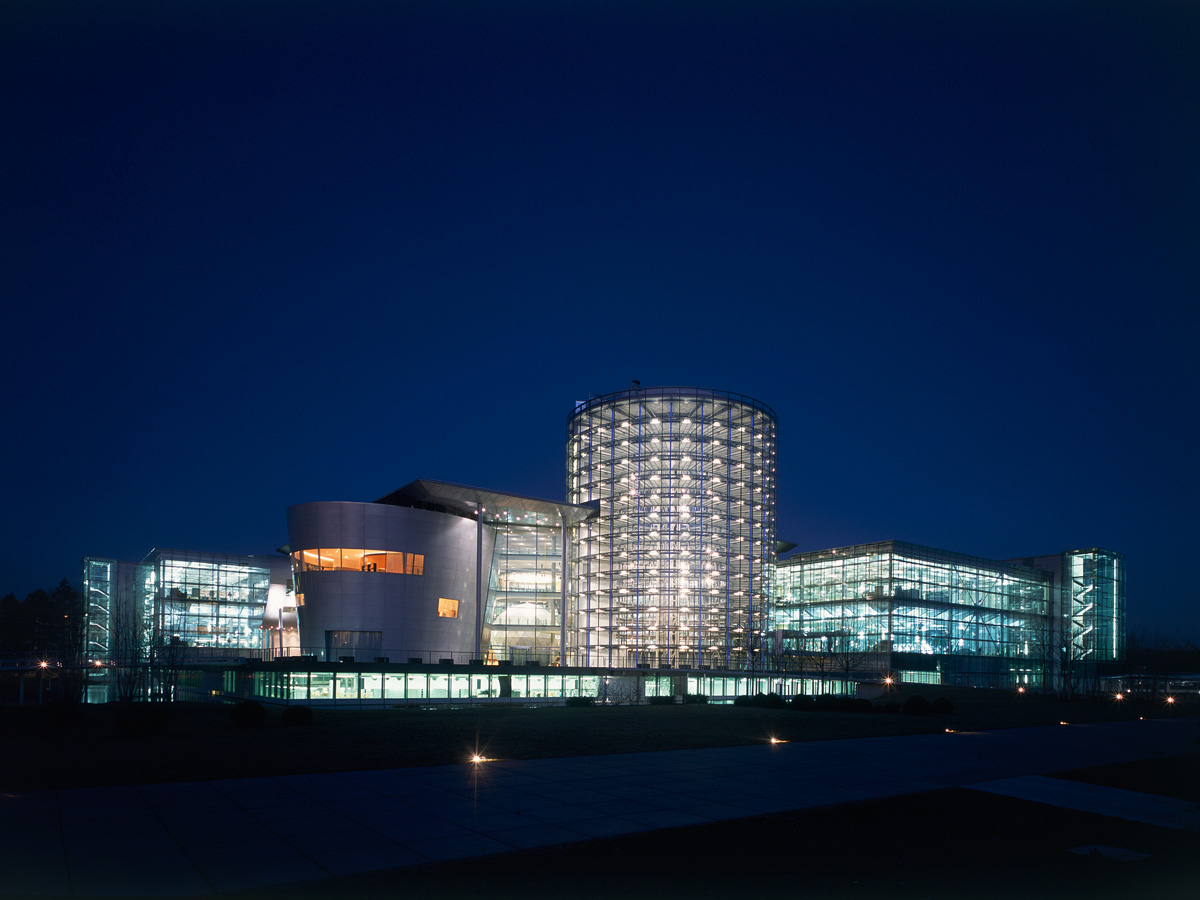
The Transparent Factory

The Transparent Factory was a car factory and exhibition space in Dresden, Germany owned by German carmaker Volkswagen (through Volkswagen Sachsen GmbH subsidiary) and designed by architect Gunter Henn of the Henn GmbH firm. It originally opened in 2002, producing the Volkswagen Phaeton until 2016. As of 2017, it produced the electric version of the Golf. The ID.3 was the last car produced there, from January 2021 until the factory's closure in December 2025.

The original German name is Gläserne Manufaktur (meaning factory made of glass). Both the German and English names are a word play on the double meaning of transparent and glassy, referring to both transparency and transparency of the production process.

== Car factory ==
The factory originally assembled Volkswagen's luxury sedan, the Phaeton. It used 60,000 magnets in its fully automated assembly line. Spare capacity was also used to build Bentley Continental Flying Spur vehicles destined for the European market until 2006, when all work was transferred to Bentley's plant in Crewe, England. Production of the Bentley Flying Spur resumed in late 2013. The factory only handled final assembly. Operations such as stamping and welding and the painting of the steel bodies took place in Zwickau. Painted bodies arrived at the factory by truck. The other 1200 parts and 34 preassembled components were shipped to a logistics center and were transported to the factory by CarGoTrams that ran on Dresden's public transport tracks. All vehicle production at the factory ended in March 2016, before restarting again in 2017. The Volkswagen ID.3 was produced here beginning in January 2021, sharing production with the Zwickau-Mosel Plant.

The factory closed in December 2025 in the Volkswagen Group's first domestic (German) manufacturing plant closure, as part of cost-cutting which included layoffs.

The site would remain with Volkswagen Group as a research and development centre for chips, artificial intelligence and robotics. The Technical University of Dresden will eventually occupy about half of the facility.

== Location ==
The Transparent Factory is situated in the city center of Dresden, an 800-year-old baroque city known for its arts and craftsmanship. It stands in a corner of the Großer Garten, where a convention center was located before the Second World War. The factory's walls are made almost completely of glass. Its floors are covered entirely in Canadian maple. Its visitor-friendly layout was designed to accommodate up to 250 tourists per day. There are no smokestacks, no loud noises, and no toxic byproducts. Volkswagen planted 350 trees on the grounds.

== Visitor experience ==
Visitors can test drive VW electric vehicles for 30 minutes, take a virtual tour of Dresden and look at various exhibits relating to VW's electric and hybrid technologies.

=== Previous visitor experience ===
The Gläserne Manufaktur also provided visitors with a series of educational attractions relating to the VW Phaeton. The attractions, designed by BRC Imagination Arts, include Vision World, a multimedia "global theater" that allows visitors to take the pulse of the planet in real time; a Virtual Test drive, featuring a real VW Phaeton combined with motion base technology and computer-generated scenery; a computer-based Car Configurator that enables visitors to design the VW Phaeton of their dreams; an interactive Techwall explaining the workings of the Phaeton's infotainment system; a Virtual Production Tour; and a media-enhanced Delivery Experience for customers taking possession of new vehicles.

The German TV channel ZDF occasionally filmed a philosophical panel discussion in the Transparent Factory, Das Philosophische Quartett (The Philosophical Quartet).

To stop birds from flying into the glass, an outdoor speaker system emulates bird vocalisations marking the territory as "taken".

== Gallery ==
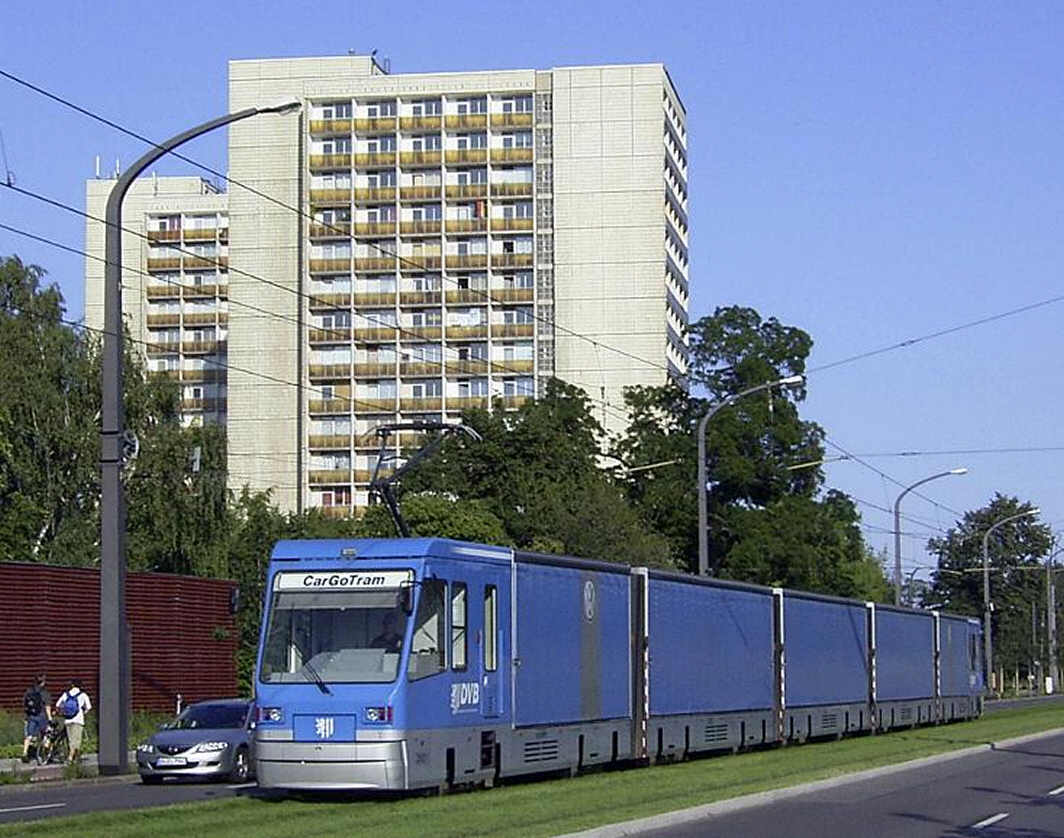
CarGoTram delivers parts to the Transparent Factory

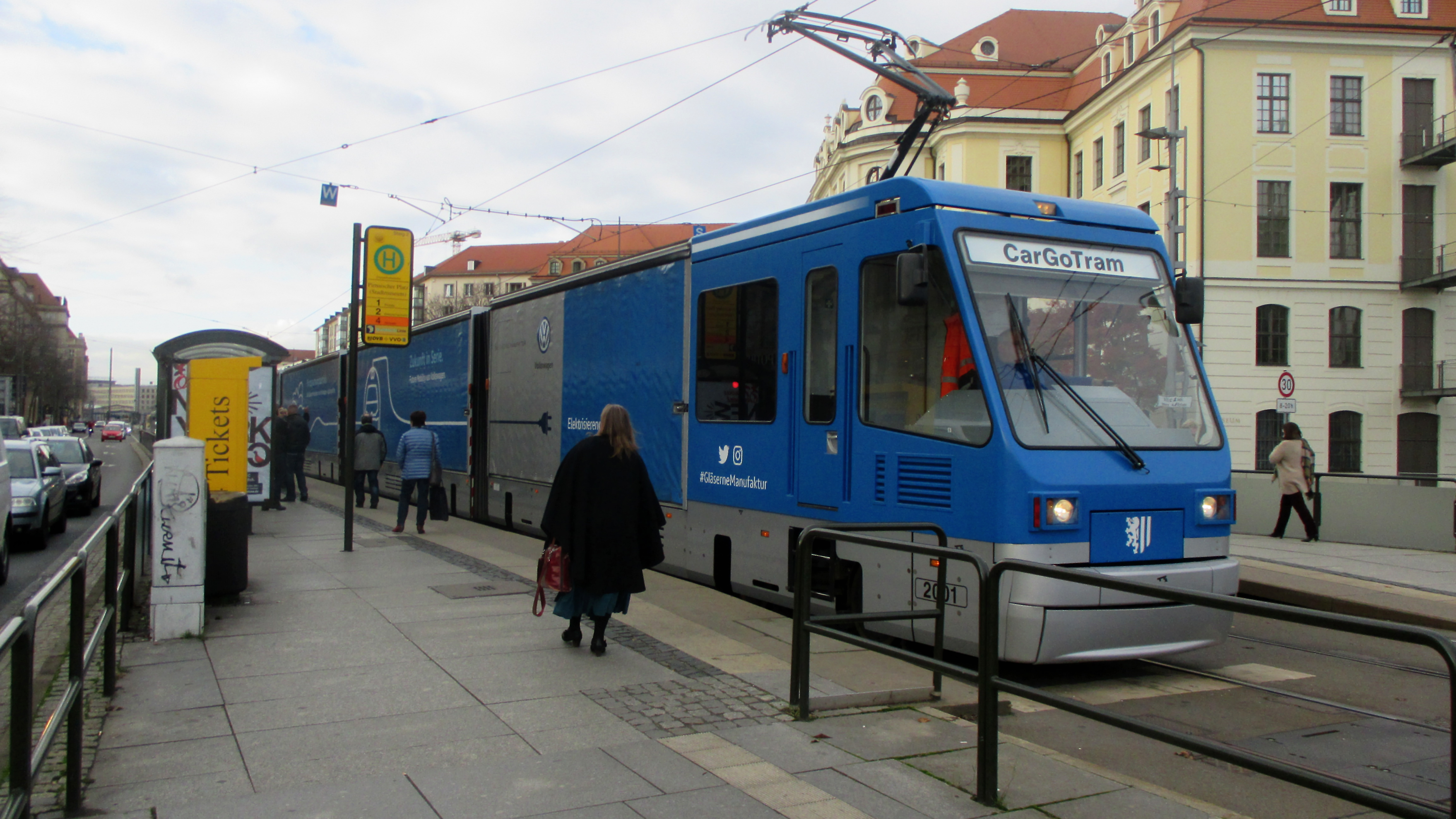
CarGoTram in Dresden - Pirnaischer Platz Dresden - Delivering parts to the Transparent Factory in 2017

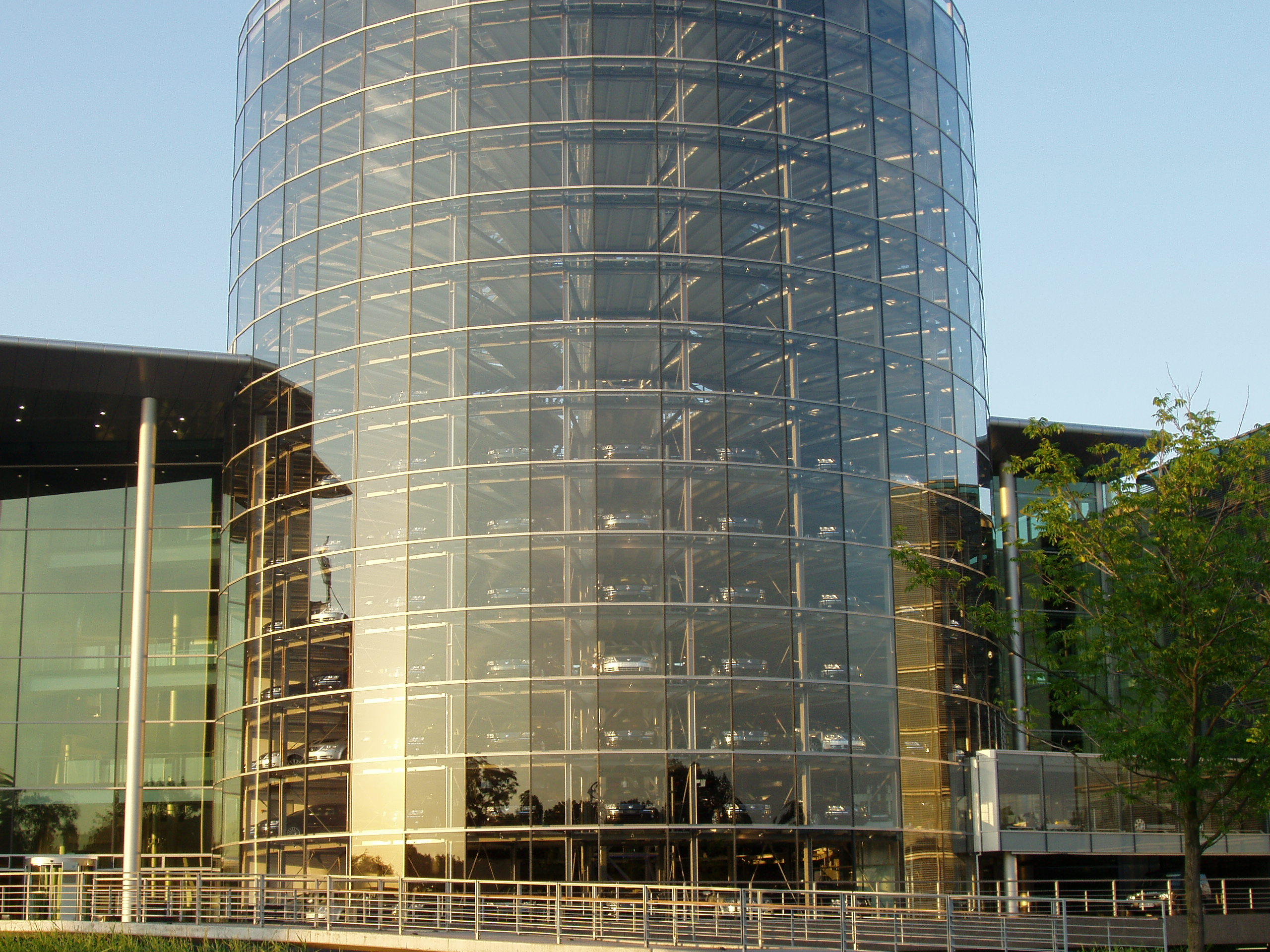
Car tower at the Volkswagen Transparent Factory in Dresden

location of the Transparent Factory in the Großer Garten park

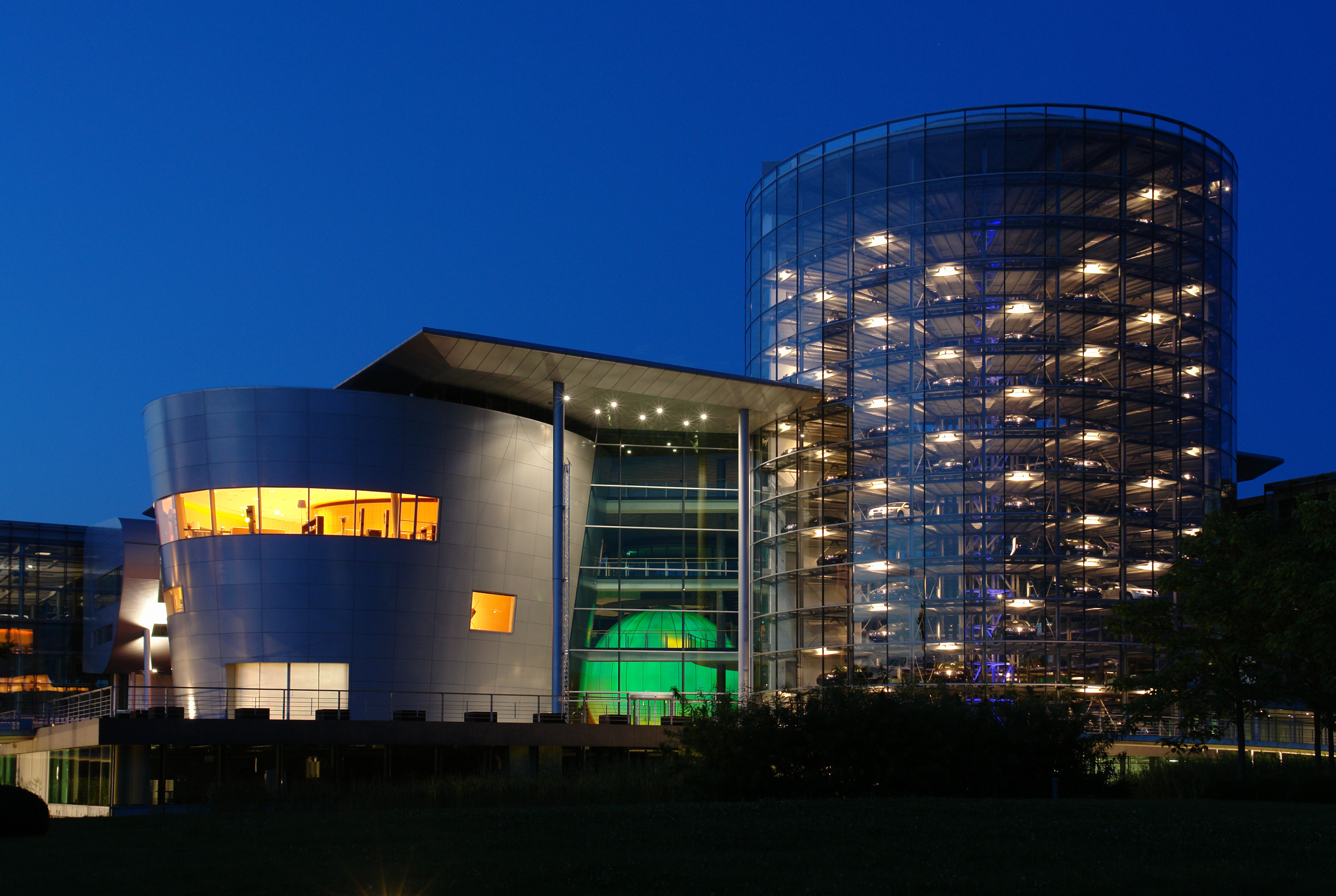
Front entrance of the Volkswagen Transparent Factory in Dresden

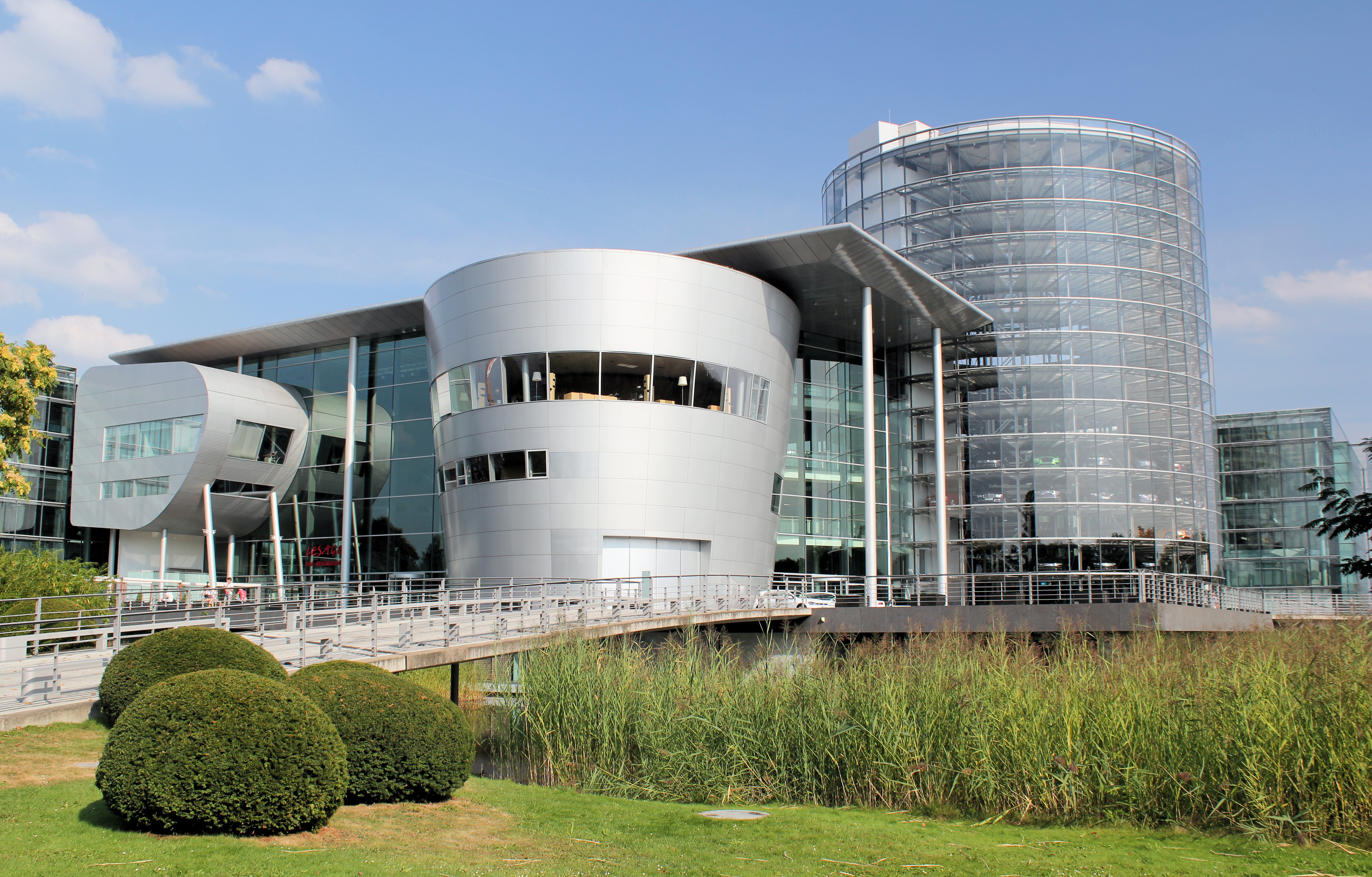
Volkswagen Transparent Factory in Dresden
