= Dresden Botanical Garden =

Botanical garden in Dresden, Saxony, Germany

Coordinates: 51.0432°N 13.7586°E

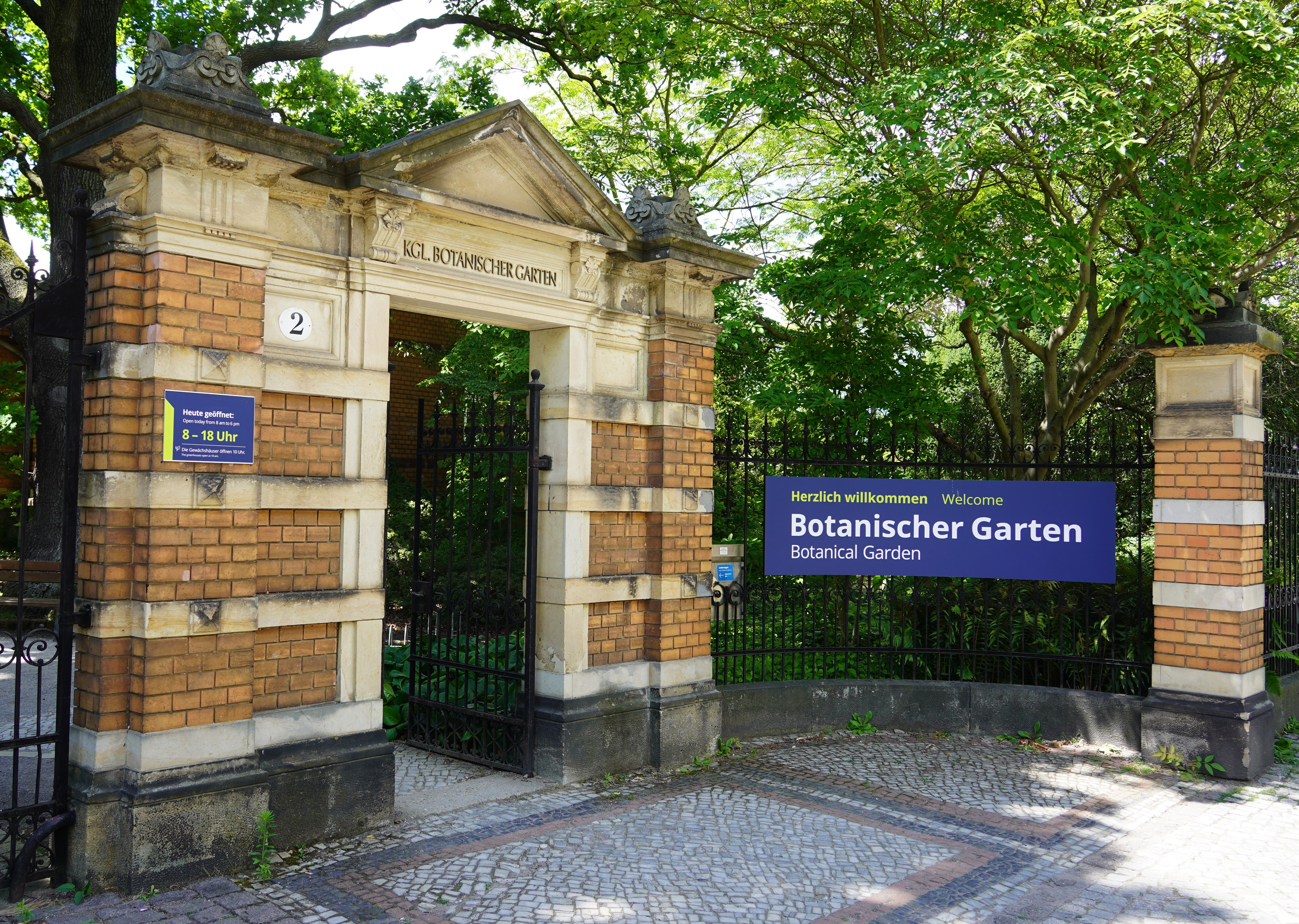
Botanischer Garten Dresden, entrance

Map of the park "Großer Garten", orange the botanical garden

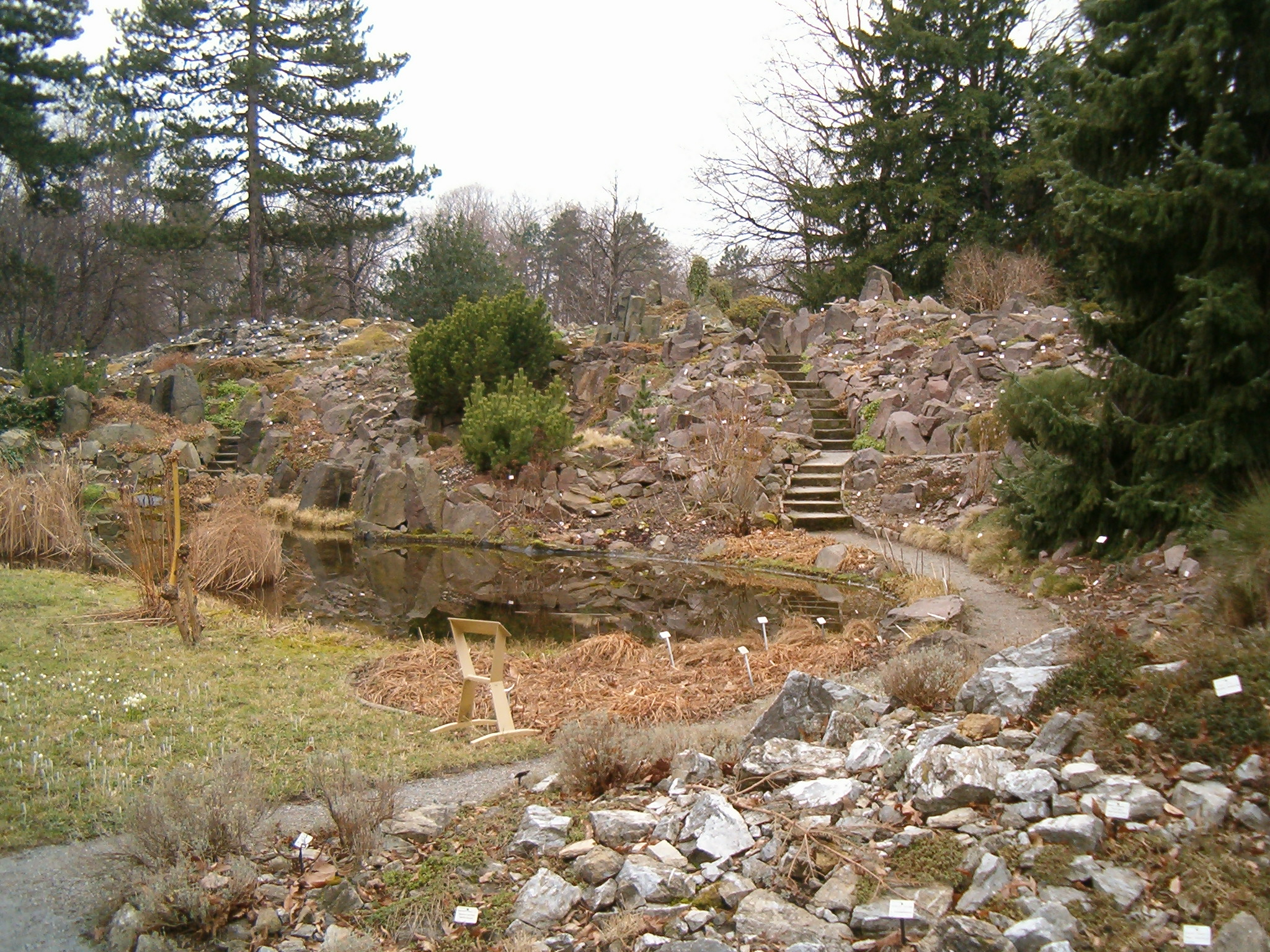
Alpine garden

The Botanischer Garten der Technischen Universität Dresden (3.25 hectares), also known as the Botanischer Garten Dresden or Dresden Botanical Garden, is a botanical garden maintained by the Dresden University of Technology. It is located in the north-west section of the Großer Garten at Stübelallee 2, Dresden, Saxony, Germany. It is open daily without charge.

Dresden has had a botanical garden since 1820 when Professor Ludwig Reichenbach created the first on a site now within the forecourt of the Police Headquarters, near the famous Brühl's Terrace. By 1822 it contained some 7,800 plant species and varieties. The contemporary garden was created in 1889 by Carl Georg Oscar Drude and officially opened in 1893. However, it was devastated in February 1945 during the bombing of Dresden in World War II. In 1949 it became a part of the Dresden University of Technology, and in 1950 reopened with partially restored outdoor gardens. In subsequent years administrative buildings and greenhouses have been rebuilt.

Today the garden contains approximately 10,000 plant species, including unusual collections of annual plants (about 800 species) and wild plants from Saxony and Thuringia. It contains geographically arranged sections of plants from Asia, North America, etc., including the unusual Quercus phellos as well as Corydalis nobilis, Hamamelis, rhododendrons, magnolias, and so forth; a systematic section; an alpine garden collecting a variety of European high mountain plants, including gentian (Gentiana), species of saxifrage (Saxifraga), Dianthus caryophyllus, numerous cruciferous plants and primroses; and a garden that contains poisonous, curative, and medicinal plants.

The garden also contains five greenhouses of about 1,000 m^{2} total area, containing some 3,000 species, as well as an aquatic greenhouse for Victoria cruziana and plants from tropical America including Ananas comosus, Tillandsia usneoides, Theobroma cacao, epiphytic bromeliads, etc. The Great Tropical House (Paläotropis) contains tropical flora of Asia and Africa, including Cinnamomum verum, Coffea arabica, Elaeis guineensis, Ficus religiosa, Gossypium arboreum, Hibiscus rosa-sinensis, Musa acuminata, Pandanus, Piper nigrum, Platycerium, Saccharum officinarum, and Streptocarpus sect. Saintpaulia. The succulent house contains a Selenicereus grandiflorus and various cacti, succulents, orchids, and carnivorous plants.

== See also ==
- List of botanical gardens in Germany
