= Outline of Dresden =

Overview of and topical guide to Dresden

Flag of Dresden

Coat of arms of Dresden

The following outline is provided as an overview of and topical guide to Dresden:

Dresden – capital and the most populated city in the German state of Saxony. With over 547,172 residents in 328.8 km2 (127.0 sq mi) it is also Germany's twelfth largest Großstadt. Dresden is one of the most visited cities in Germany.

== General reference ==
- Pronunciation: German pronunciation: [ˈdʁeːsdn̩];
- Common English name(s): Dresden
- Official English name(s): City of Dresden
- Adjectival(s): Dresdener
- Demonym(s): Dresdener

== Geography of Dresden ==
Geography of Dresden

- Dresden is:
  - a city
    - capital of Saxony
- Population of Dresden: 547,172
- Area of Dresden: 328.8 km^{2} (127.0 sq mi)
- Atlas of Dresden

Dresden
- Location within Germany
- Coordinates: 51°2′N 13°44′E

=== Location of Dresden ===
Dresden is situated within the following regions:

- Northern Hemisphere and Eastern Hemisphere
  - Eurasia
    - Europe (outline)
      - Central Europe
        - Germany (outline)
          - Saxony
- Time zone(s):
  - Central European Time (UTC+01)
  - In Summer (DST): Central European Summer Time (UTC+02)

=== Environment of Dresden ===
- Climate of Dresden

=== Landforms of Dresden ===
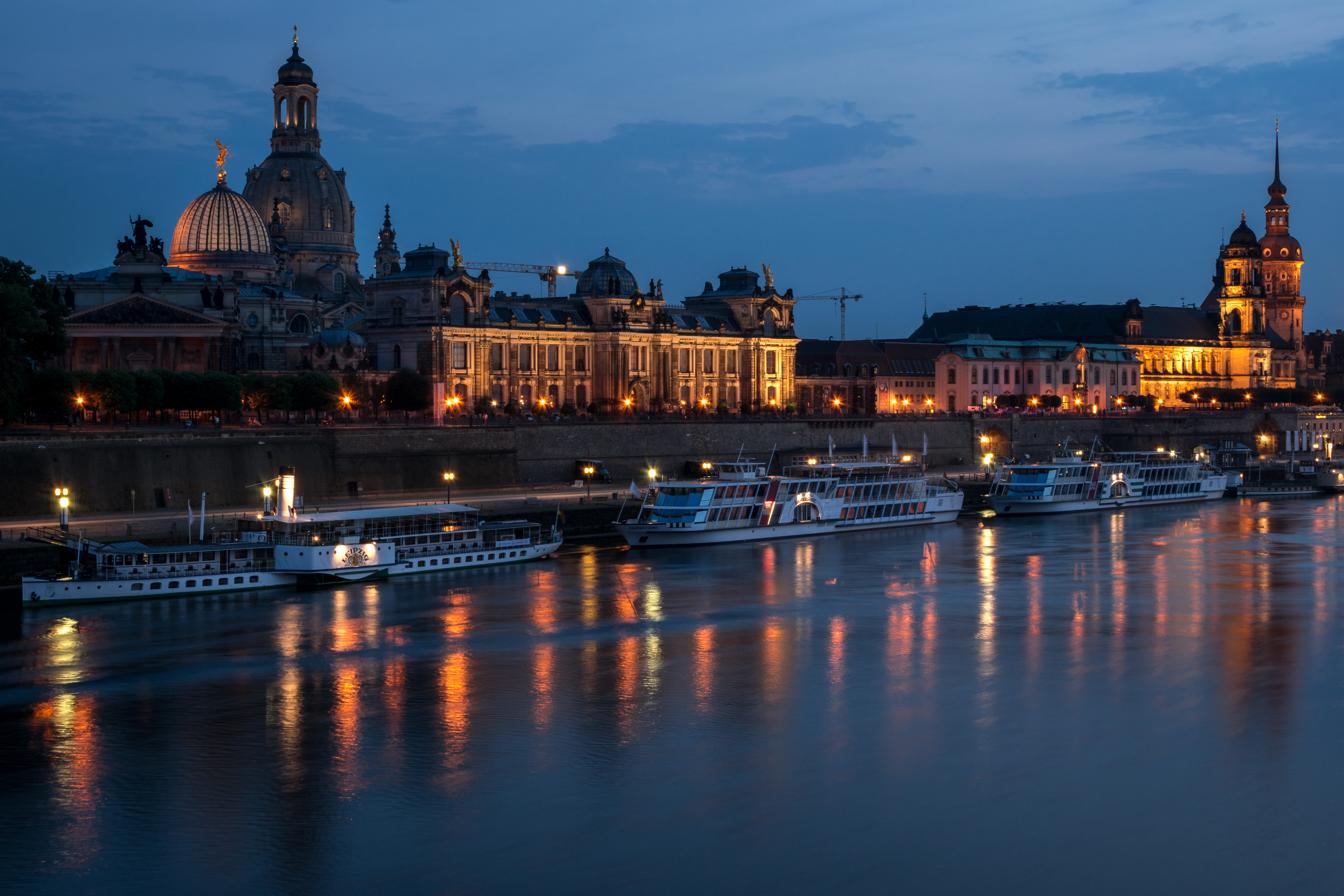
The Elbe river

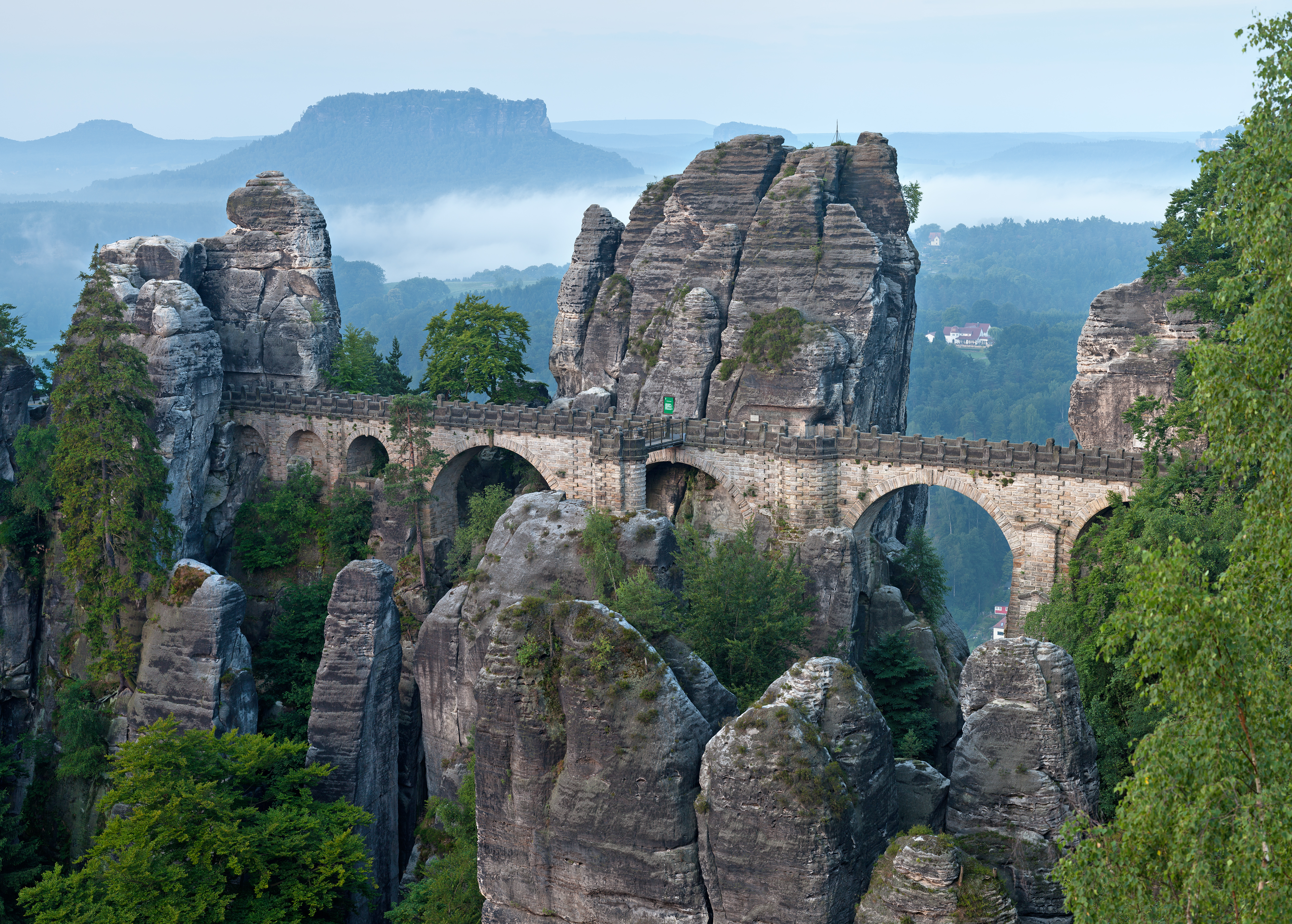
Bastei bridge in Saxon Switzerland

Geography and urban development of Dresden

- Highlands in Dresden
  - Schönfeld Upland
- Rivers in Dresden
  - Elbe
  - Landgraben
  - Weißeritz
- Valleys in Dresden
  - Dresden Elbe Valley
    - Dresden Basin

=== Areas of Dresden ===
==== Districts of Dresden ====
- Löbtau
- Gorbitz

==== Neighborhoods in Dresden ====
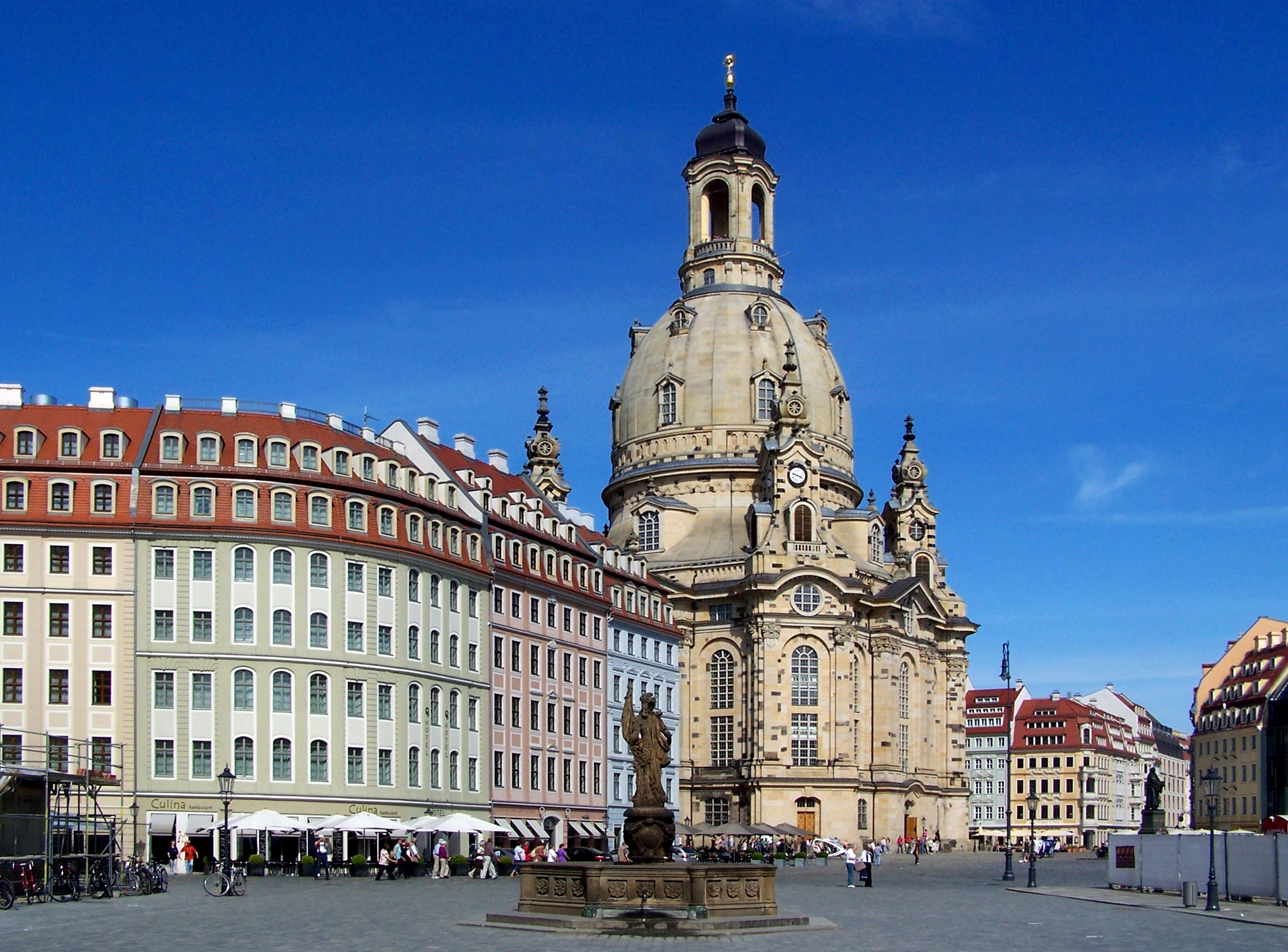
The Neumarkt area

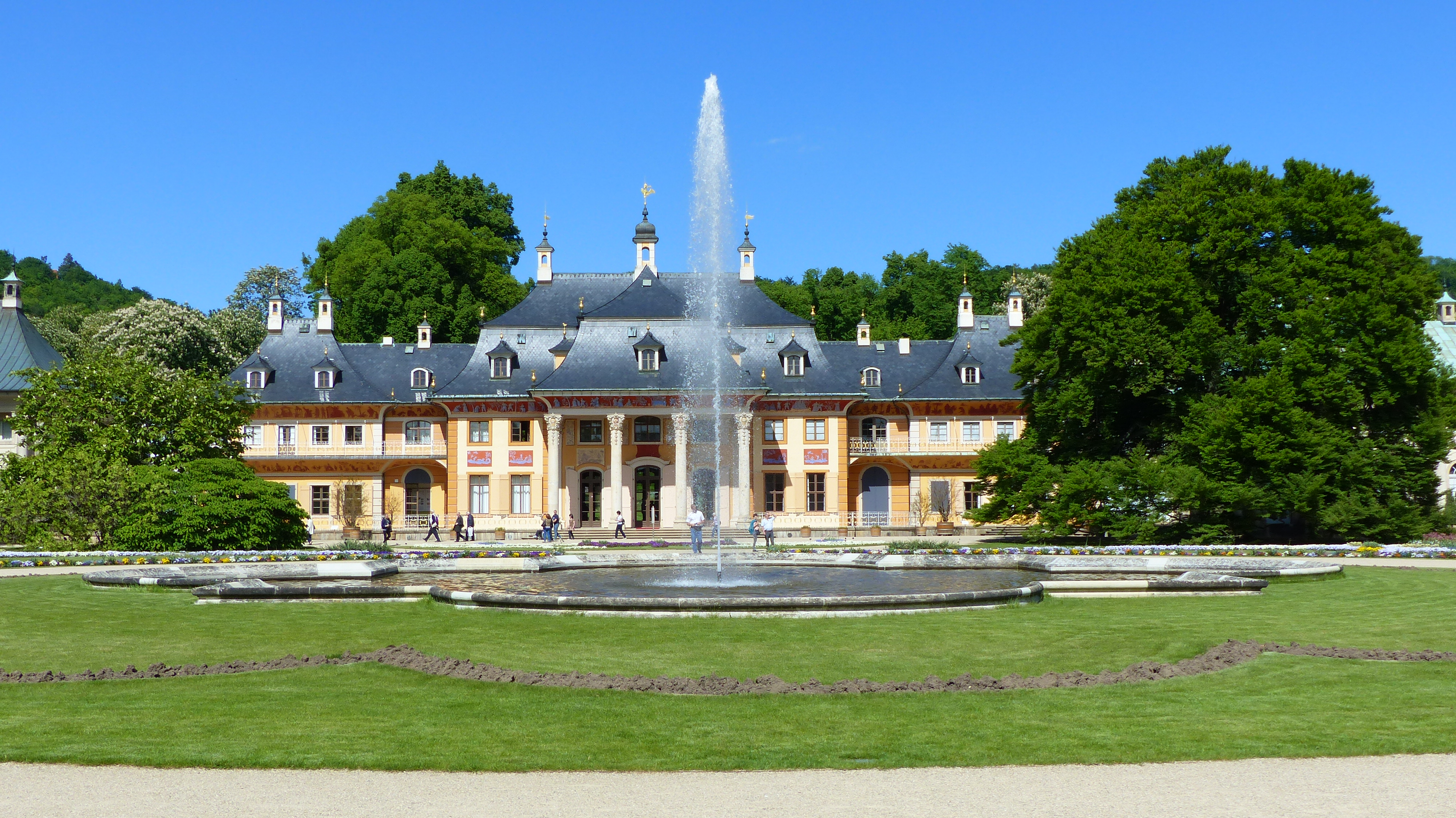
Pillnitz, the park of the Pillnitz Castle

- Albertstadt
- Äußere Neustadt
- Blasewitz
- Buehlau
- Friedrichstadt
- Hellerau
- Innere Neustadt
- Loschwitz
- Mickten
- Neumarkt
- Pillnitz

=== Locations in Dresden ===
- Tourist attractions in Dresden
  - Shopping areas and markets
    - Striezelmarkt
  - World Heritage sites in Dresden

==== Bridges in Dresden ====
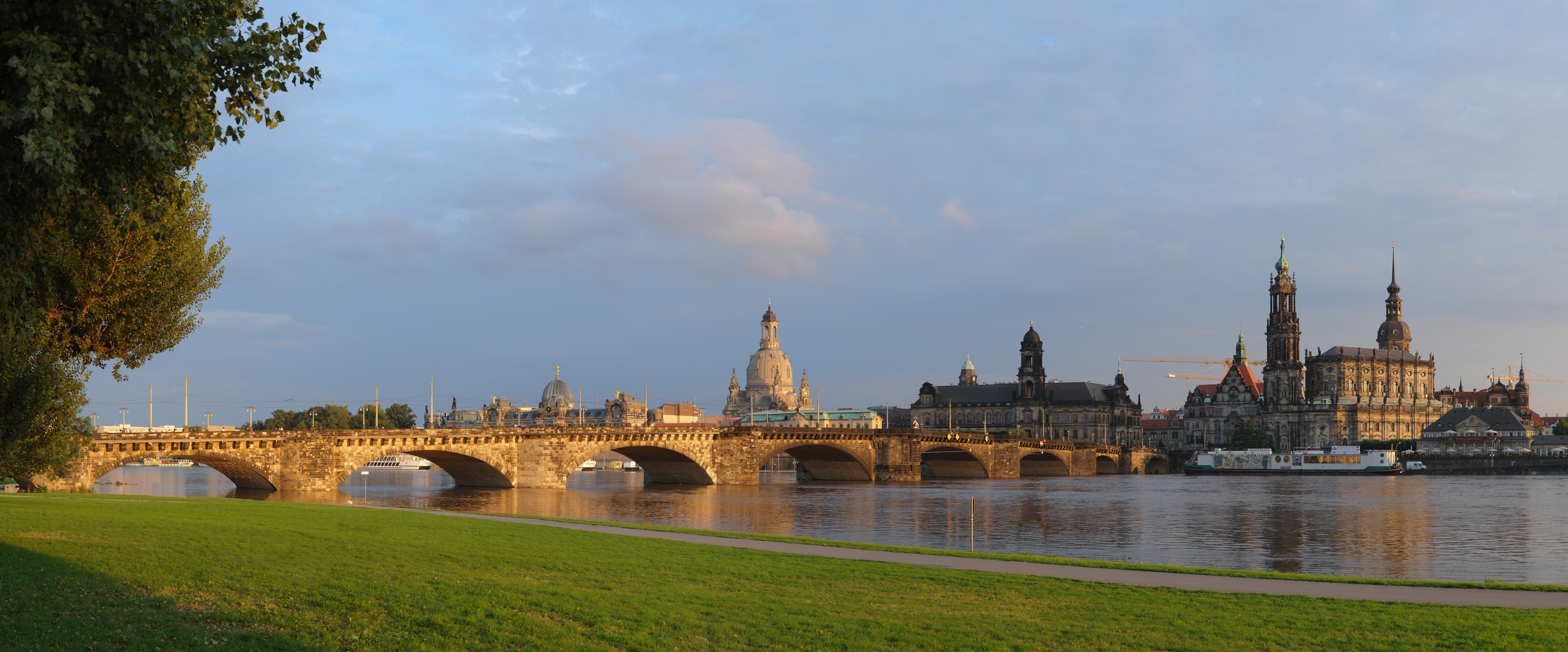
Augustus Bridge

- Augustus Bridge
- Loschwitz Bridge
- Waldschlösschen Bridge

==== Castles in Dresden ====
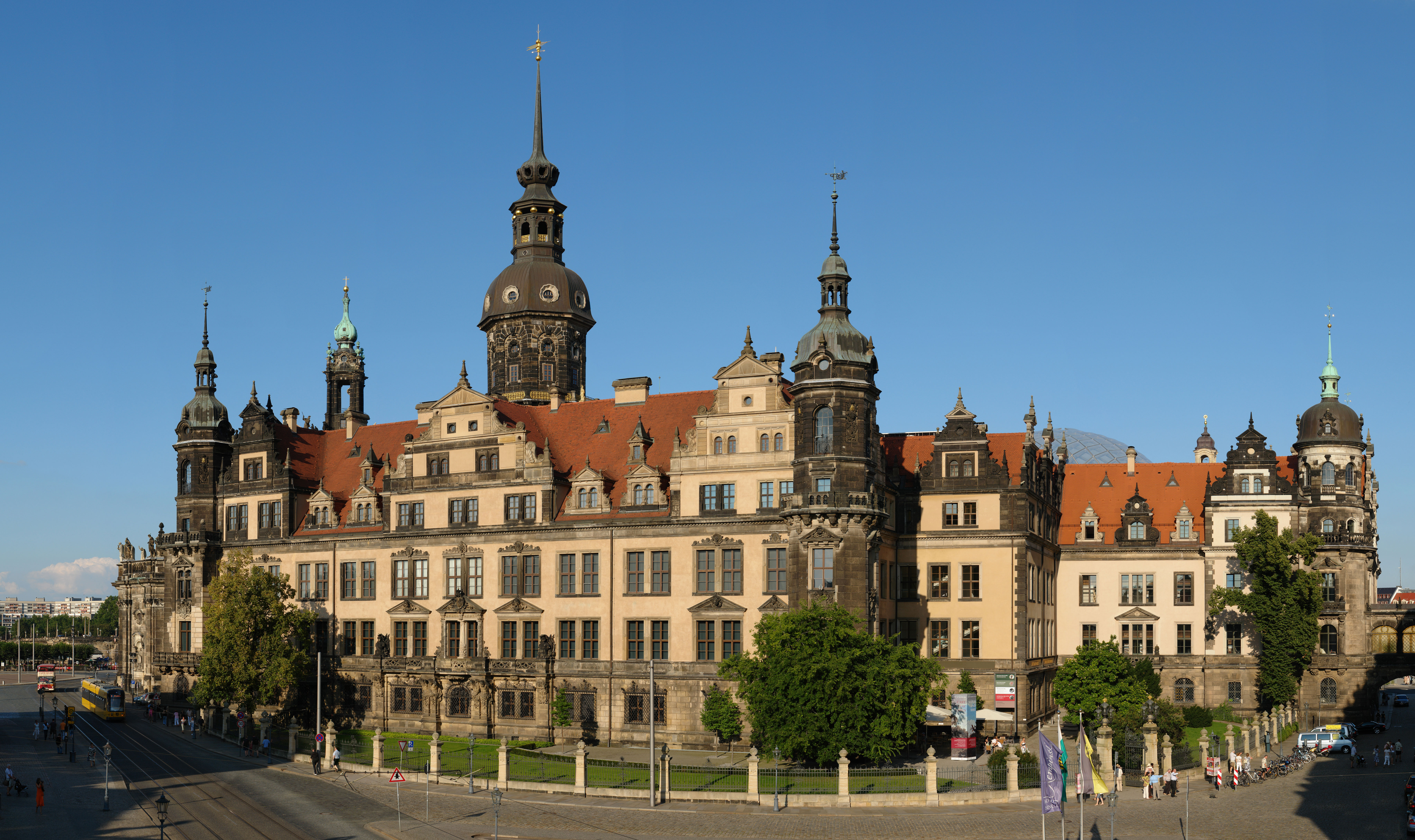
The Dresden Castle, one of the oldest buildings in Dresden

- Dresden Castle
  - Dresden Armoury
  - Fürstenzug
  - Kupferstich-Kabinett
  - Münzkabinett

==== Cultural and exhibition centres in Dresden ====
- Transparent Factory

==== Monuments and memorials in Dresden ====
- Busmannkapelle Memorial

==== Museums and art galleries in Dresden ====
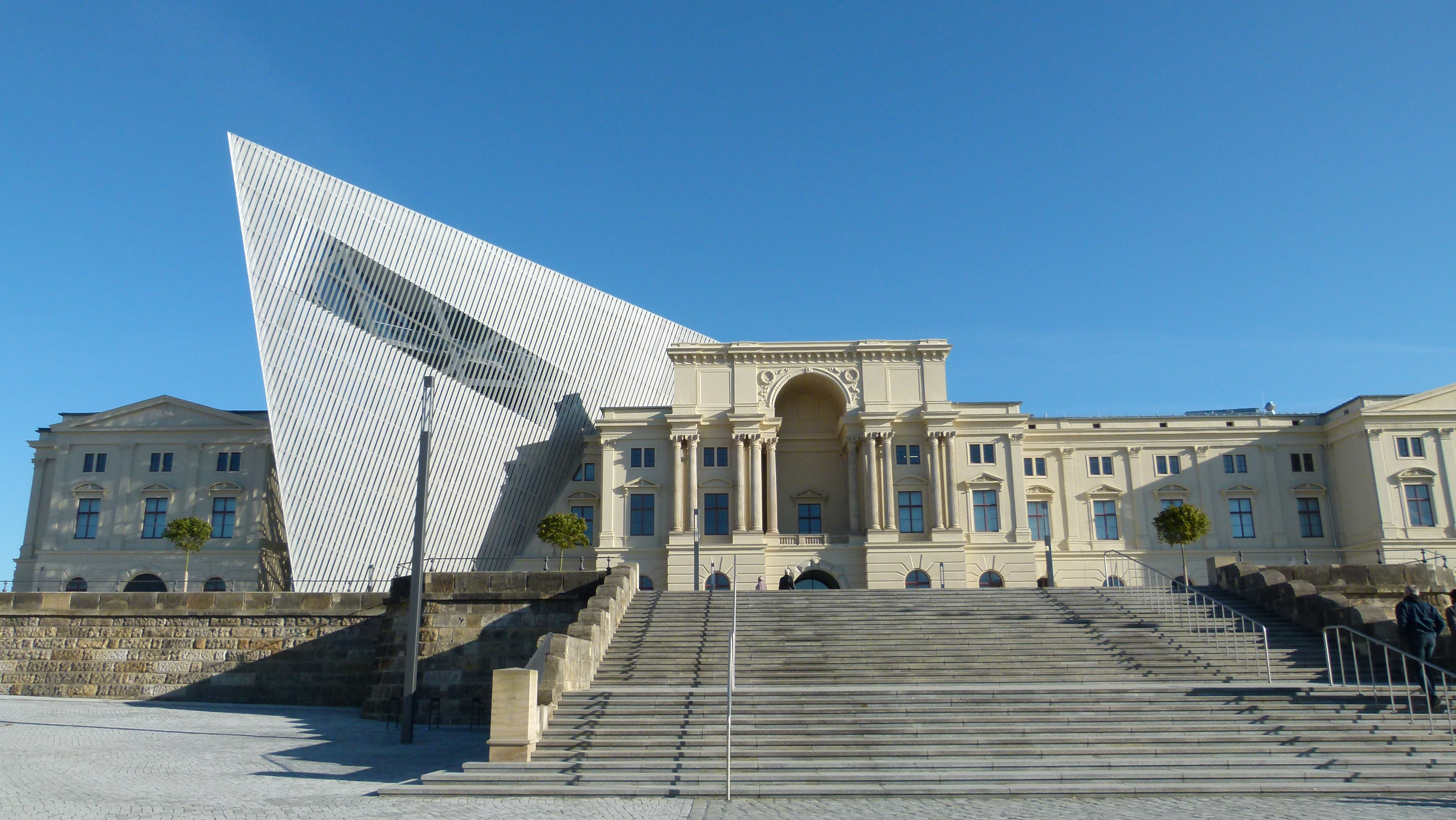
The Bundeswehr Military History Museum

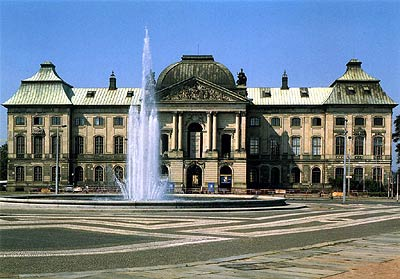
Dresden Museum of Ethnology

- Albertinum
  - Skulpturensammlung
- Bundeswehr Military History Museum
- Dresden City Art Gallery
- Dresden City Museum
- Dresden Museum of Ethnology
- Dresden Transport Museum
- Galerie Neue Meister
- Gemäldegalerie Alte Meister
- German Hygiene Museum
- Grünes Gewölbe
- Semper Gallery
- State Museum of Zoology

==== Palaces and villas in Dresden ====
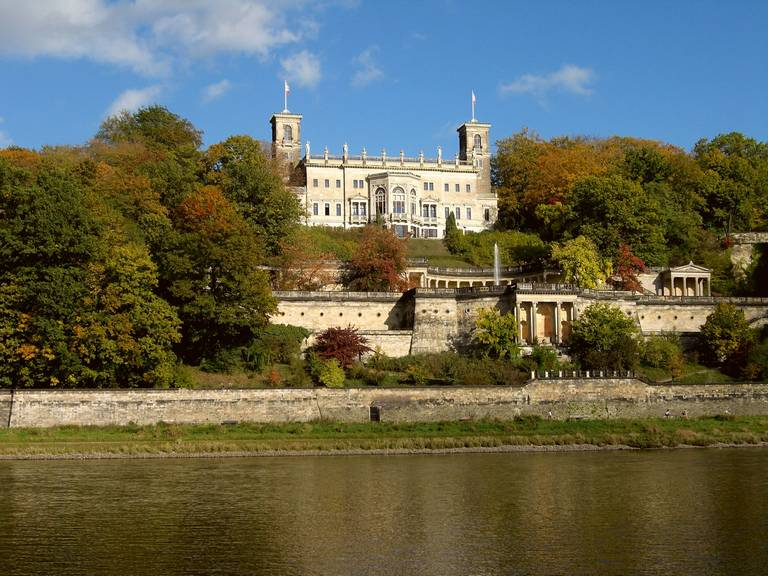
Albrechtsberg Palace

- Albrechtsberg Palace
- Japanisches Palais
- Kaiserpalast
- Palais Flemming-Sulkowski
- Pillnitz Castle
- Wackerbarth-Palais
- Zwinger
  - Dresden Porcelain Collection
  - Mathematisch-Physikalischer Salon

==== Parks and gardens in Dresden ====
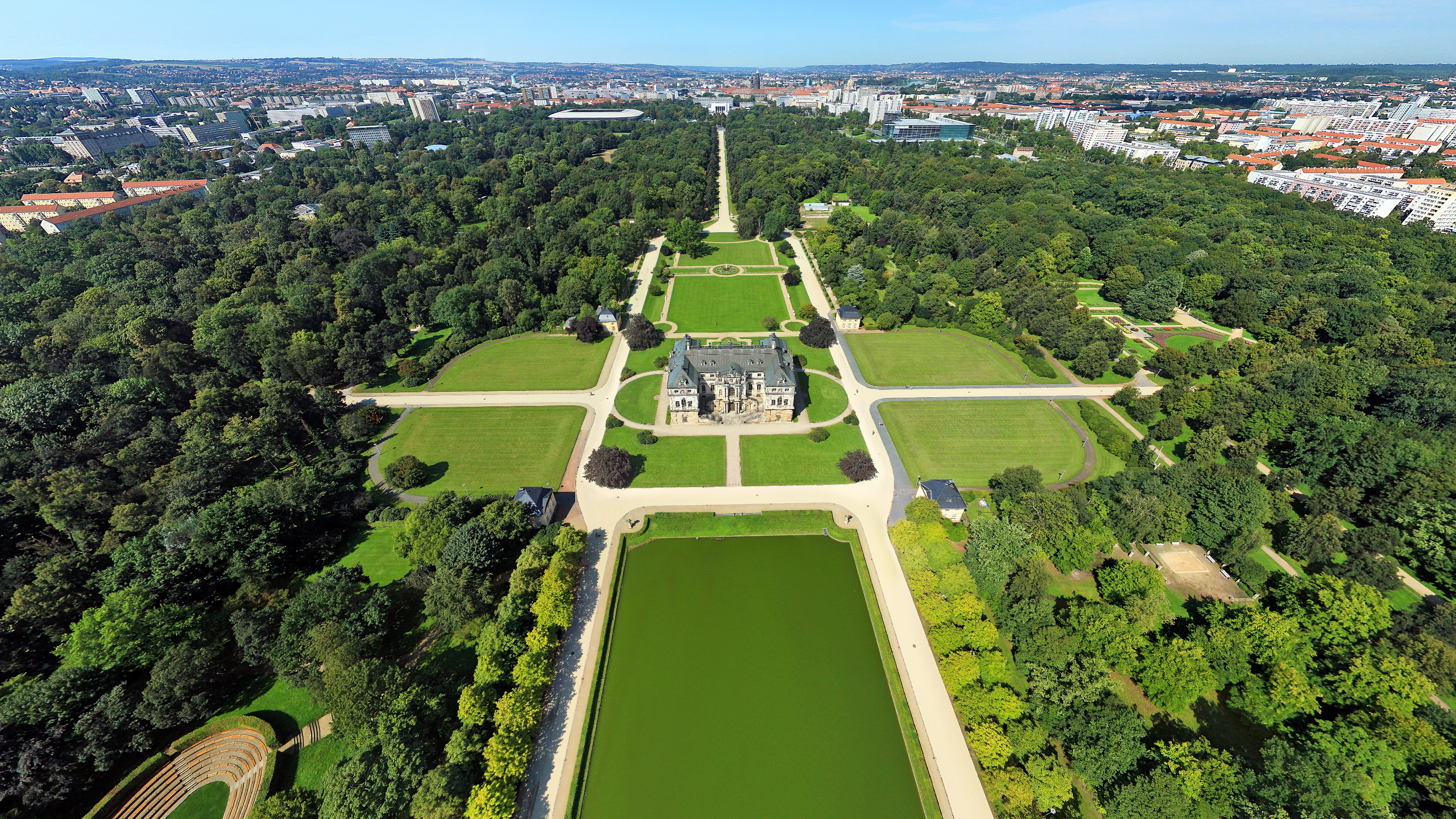
The Großer Garten

- Großer Garten
  - Dresden Botanical Garden
  - Dresden Zoo

==== Public squares in Dresden ====
- Pirnaischer Platz
- Schillerplatz
- Schloßplatz
- Wasaplatz

==== Religious buildings in Dresden ====
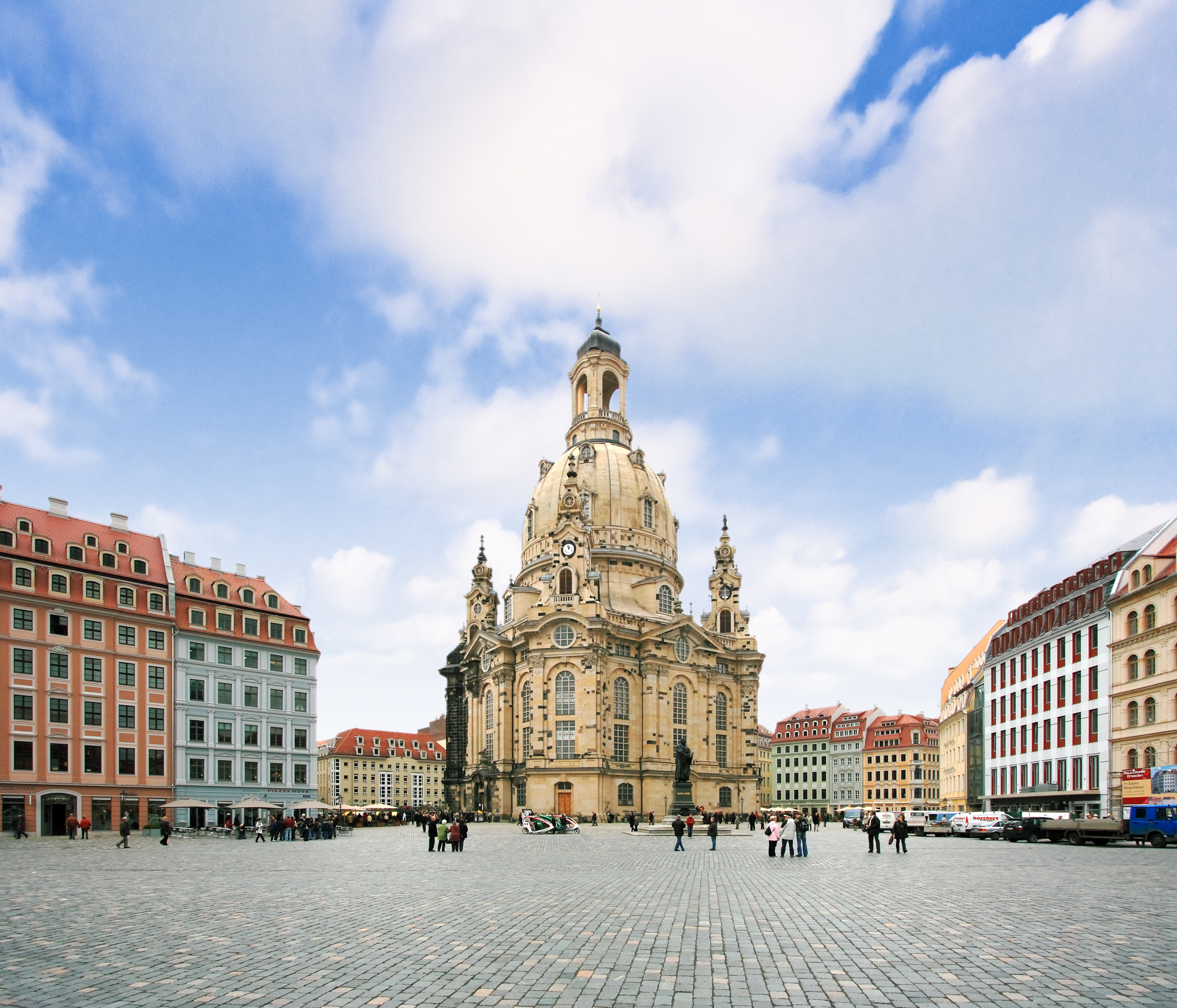
The Dresden Frauenkirche

- Church of Reconciliation
- Dresden Cathedral
- Dresden Frauenkirche
- Himmelfahrtskirche
- Kreuzkirche
- New Synagogue
- Semper Synagogue
- St. Simeon of the Wonderful Mountain Church
- Trinitatiskirche
- Zionskirche

==== Secular buildings in Dresden ====
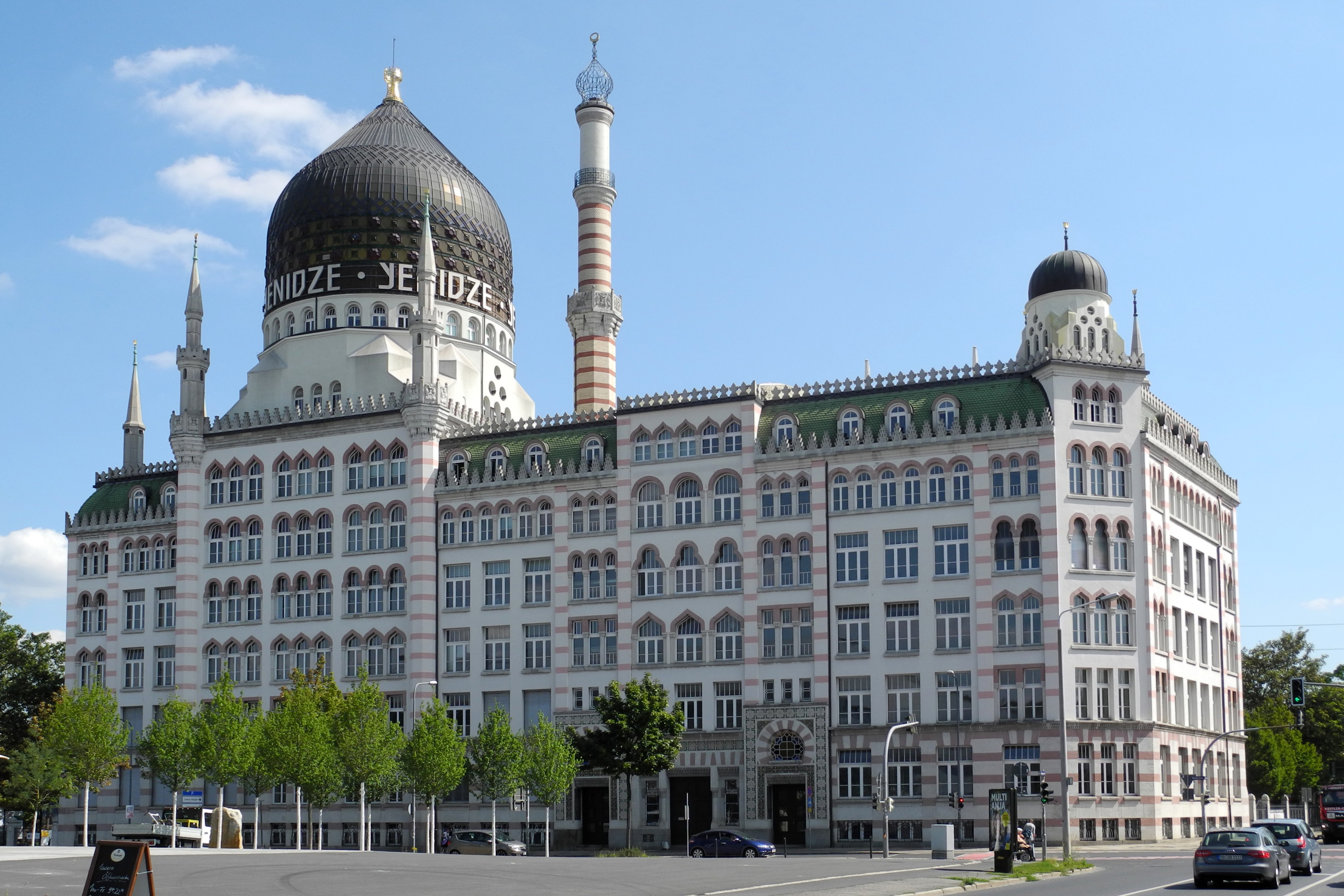
Yenidze

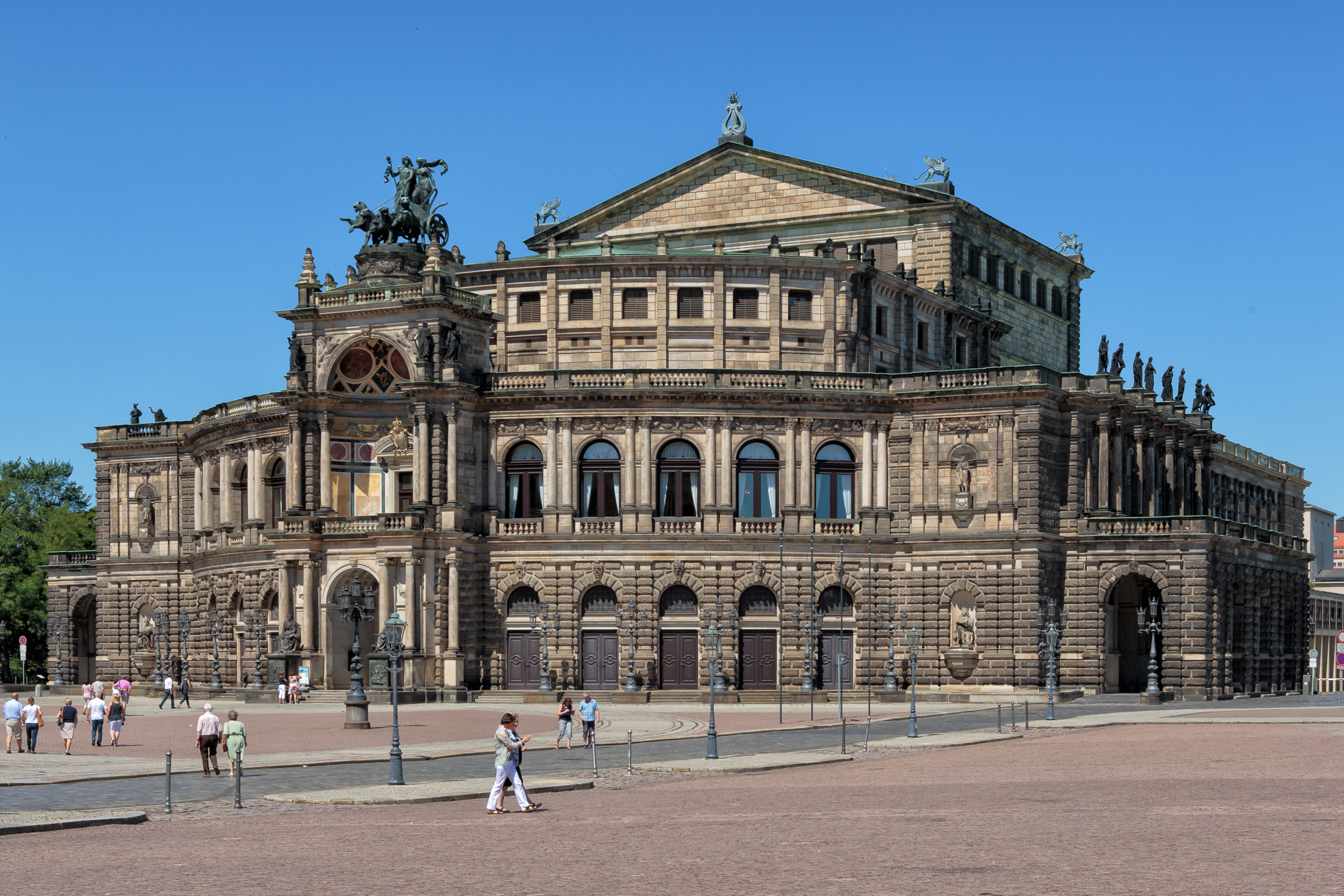
The Semperoper

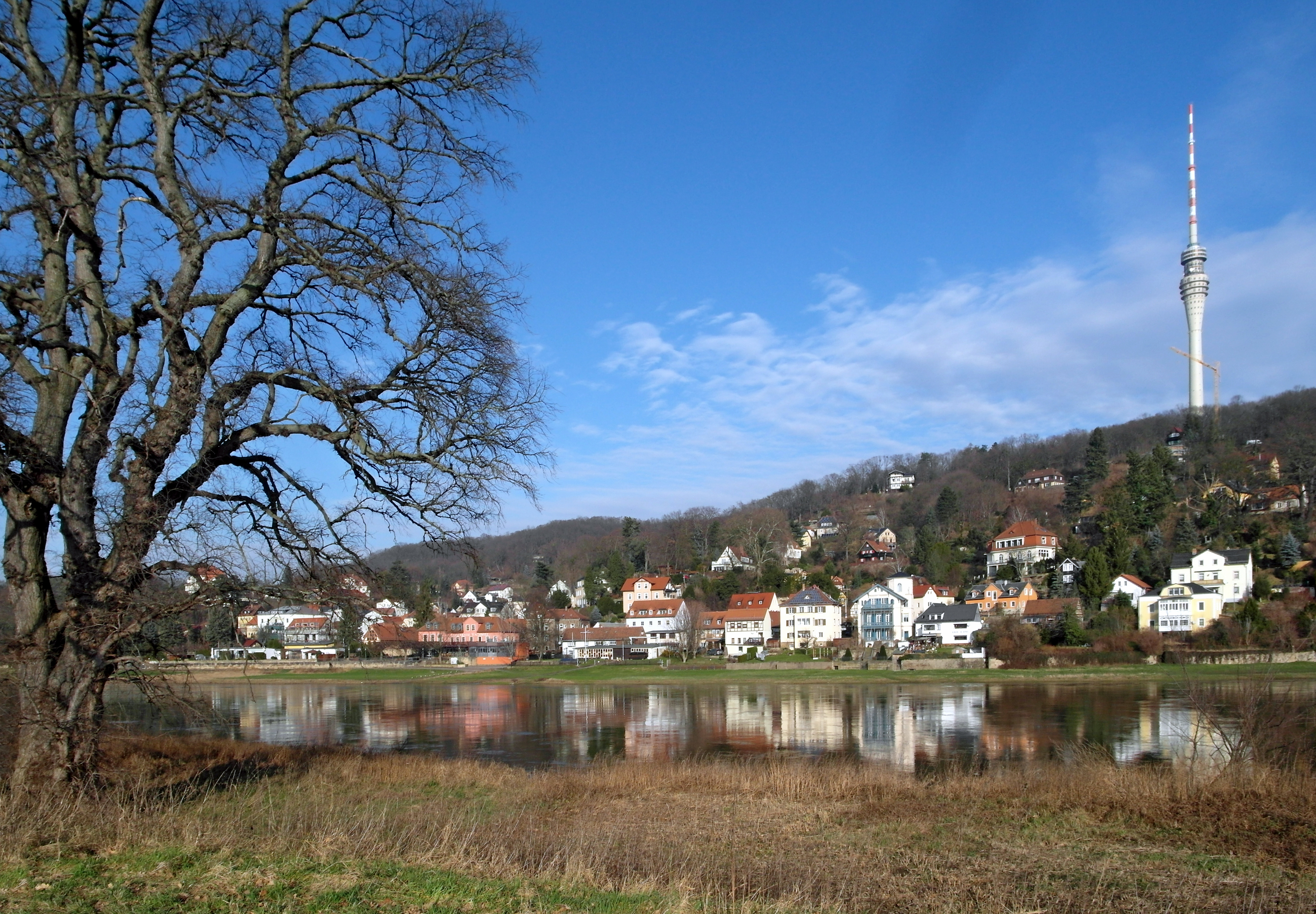
The Dresden TV tower

- Johanneum
- Landhaus
- Dresden Panometer
- Orpheum Dresden
- Sächsische Staatskanzlei
- Sächsisches Ständehaus
- Saxon Landtag
- Saxon State and University Library Dresden
  - Deutsche Fotothek
- Taschenbergpalais
- Yenidze

==== Streets in Dresden ====
- Brühl's Terrace

==== Theatres in Dresden ====
- Festspielhaus Hellerau
- Opernhaus am Taschenberg
- Opernhaus am Zwinger
- Semperoper
- Societaetstheater
- Staatsschauspiel Dresden

==== Towers in Dresden ====
- Dresden TV tower

=== Demographics of Dresden ===
Demographics of Dresden

== Government and politics of Dresden ==
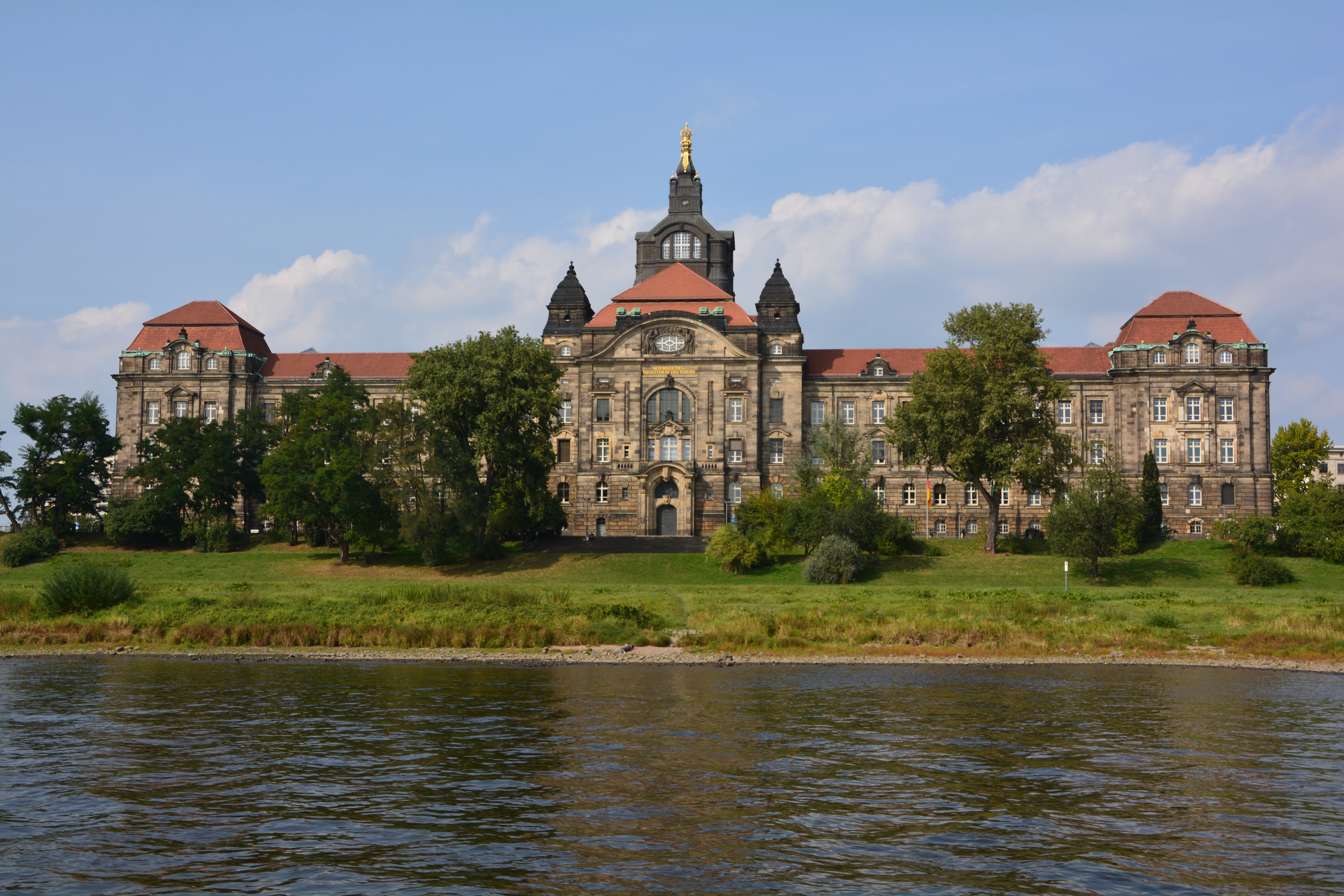
The Sächsische Staatskanzlei, the seat of the Minister-President of Saxony's office

Government and politics of Dresden

- City Council of Dresden
  - Mayors of Dresden
- International relations of Dresden
  - Sister cities of Dresden
    - Saint Petersburg, Russia, since 1961
    - Florence, Tuscany, Italy, since 1978
    - Hamburg, Germany, since 1987
    - Salzburg, Austria, since 1991

== History of Dresden ==
History of Dresden

=== History of Dresden, by period or event ===
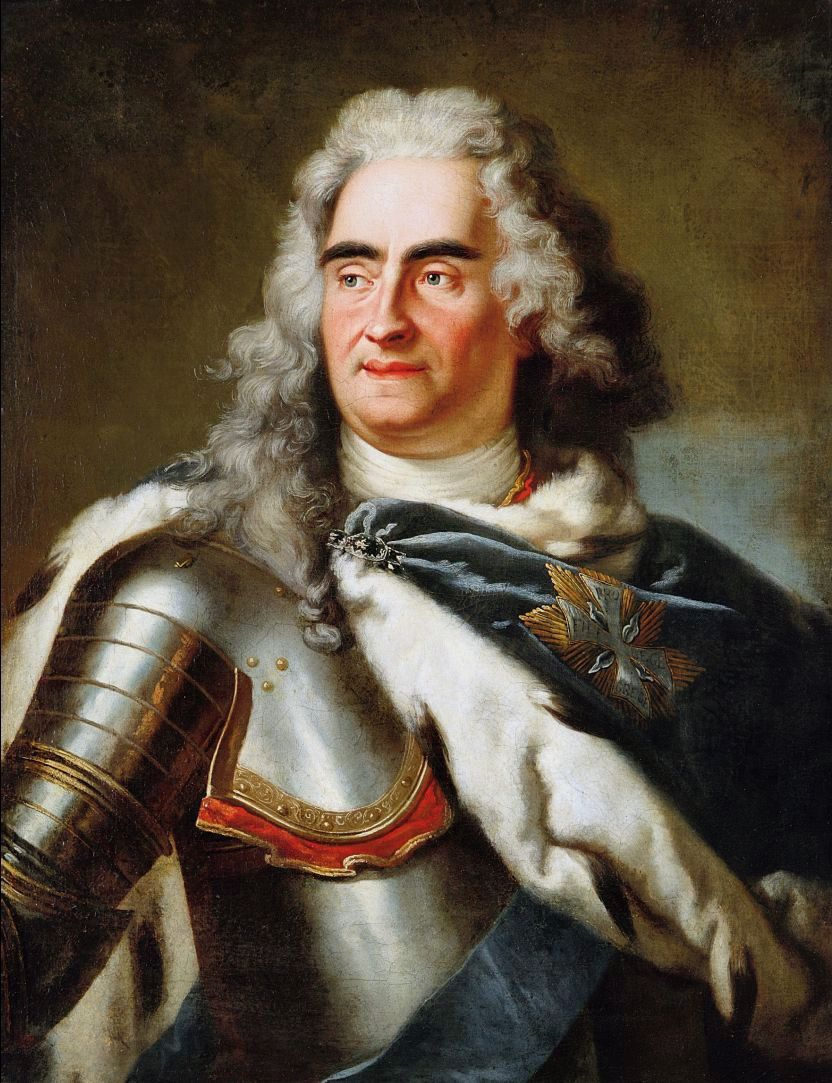
Augustus II the Strong, an important sponsor for the arts in Dresden

Timeline of Dresden

- Early history
- Kingdom of Saxony – Dresden becomes the capital of the Kingdom of Saxony (1806–1918)
  - Battle of Dresden (1813)
  - May Uprising in Dresden (1849)
- Free State of Saxony – Dresden becomes the capital of the first Free State of Saxony (1918–1934)
- Dresden during the Second World War
  - Bombing of Dresden in World War II
- Dresden post-reunification

=== History of Dresden, by subject ===
- Dresden Conference (1851)
- Siege of Dresden
- Treaty of Dresden

== Culture of Dresden ==
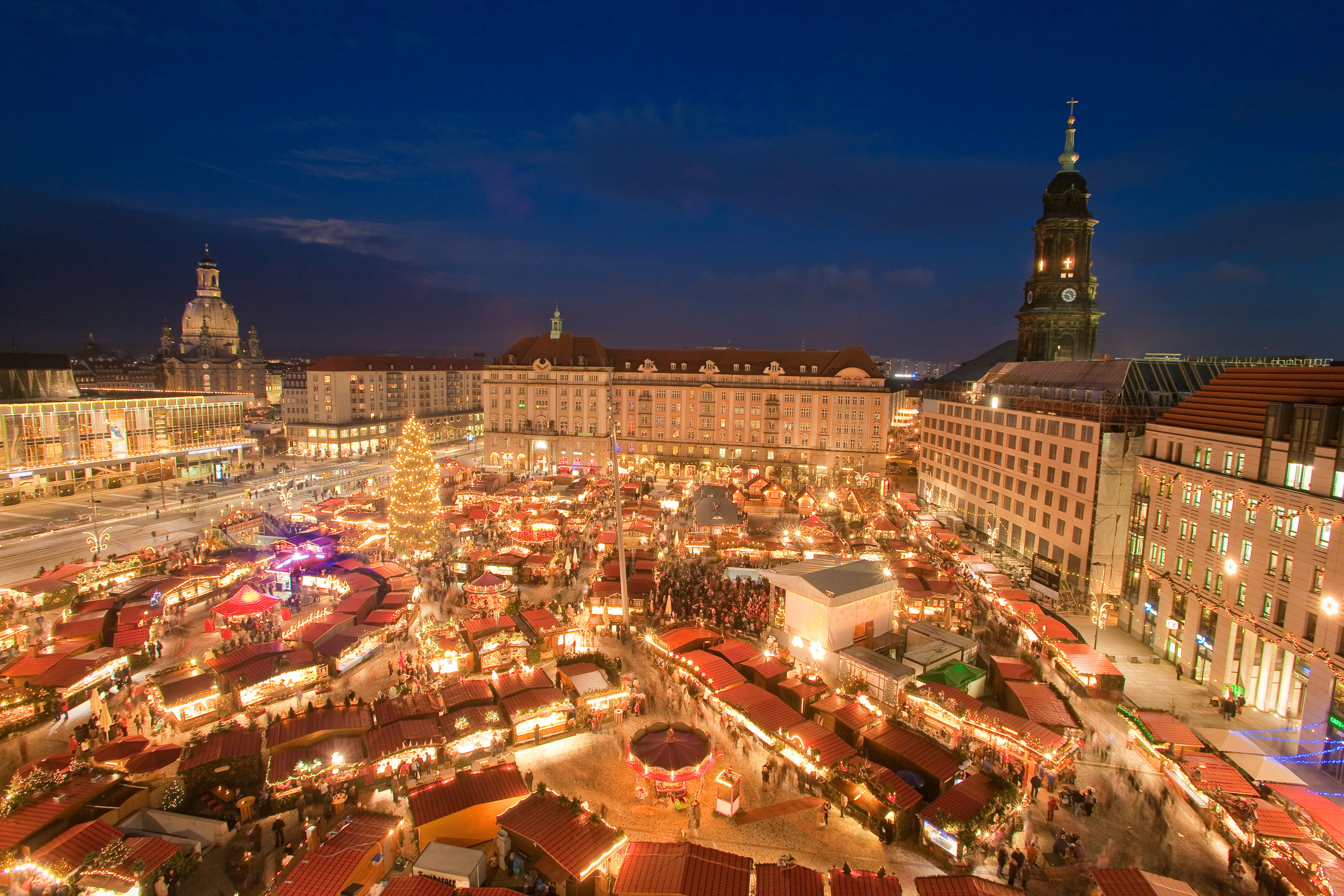
The Striezelmarkt, one of Germany's oldest documented Christmas markets

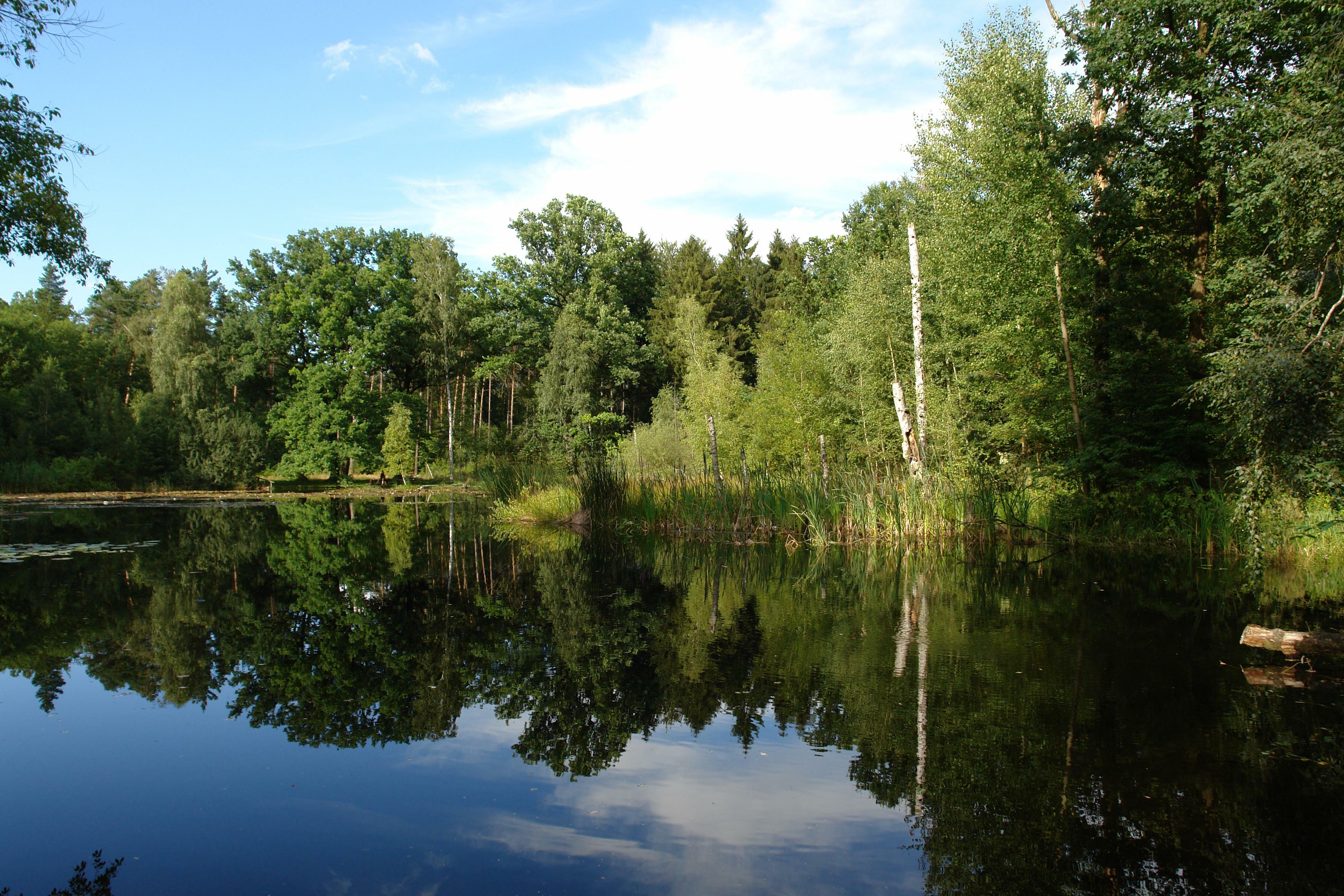
The Silver Lake in the Dresden Heath

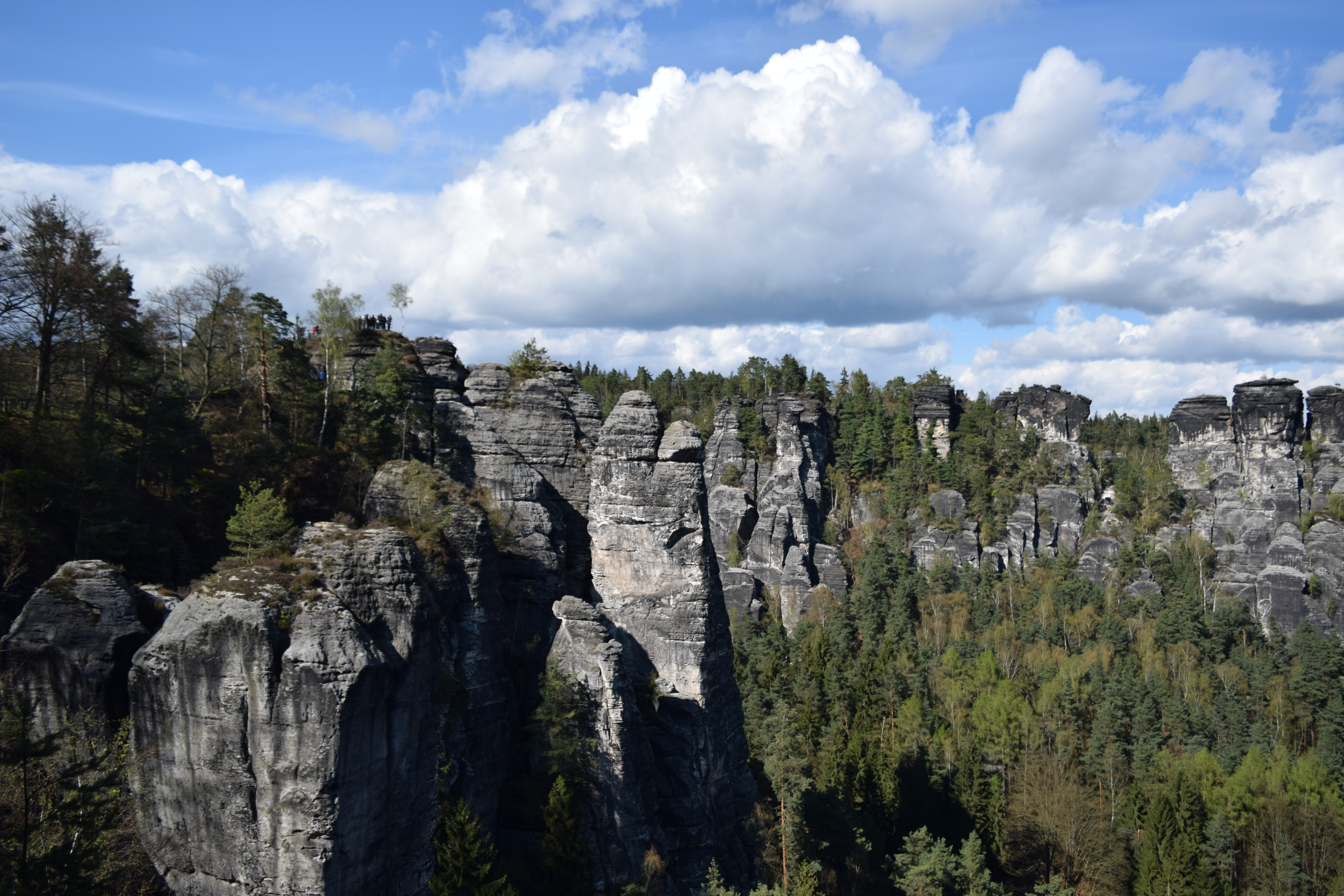
Saxon Switzerland

Culture of Dresden

- Events in Dresden
  - Annual events in Dresden
    - Elbhangfest
    - Striezelmarkt
- Festivals in Dresden
  - Bunte Republik Neustadt
  - Dresden Music Festival
  - Internationales Dixieland Festival Dresden
  - Jazztage Dresden
- Languages in Dresden
  - Upper Saxon German
  - Upper Sorbian language
- Media in Dresden
  - Newspapers in Dresden
    - Dresdner Neueste Nachrichten
    - Sächsische Zeitung
  - Radio and television in Dresden
    - Dresden Fernsehen
    - Mitteldeutscher Rundfunk
- Recreation in Dresden
  - Dresden Elbe Valley
  - Dresden Heath
  - Saxon Switzerland

=== Arts in Dresden ===
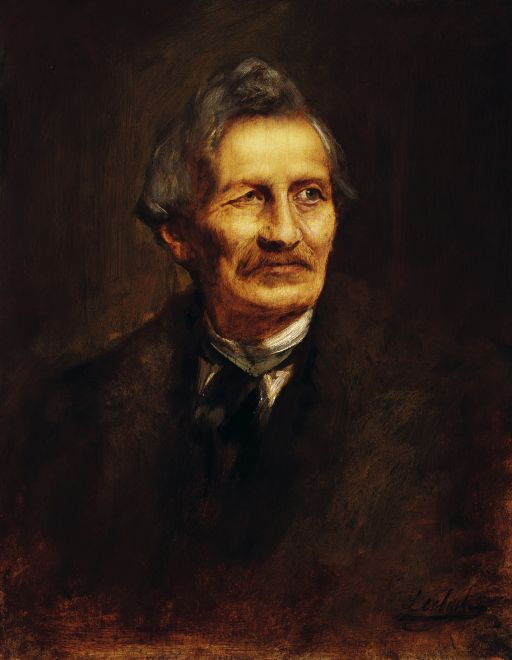
Portrait of Gottfried Semper, German architect who contributed many landmarks to Dresden

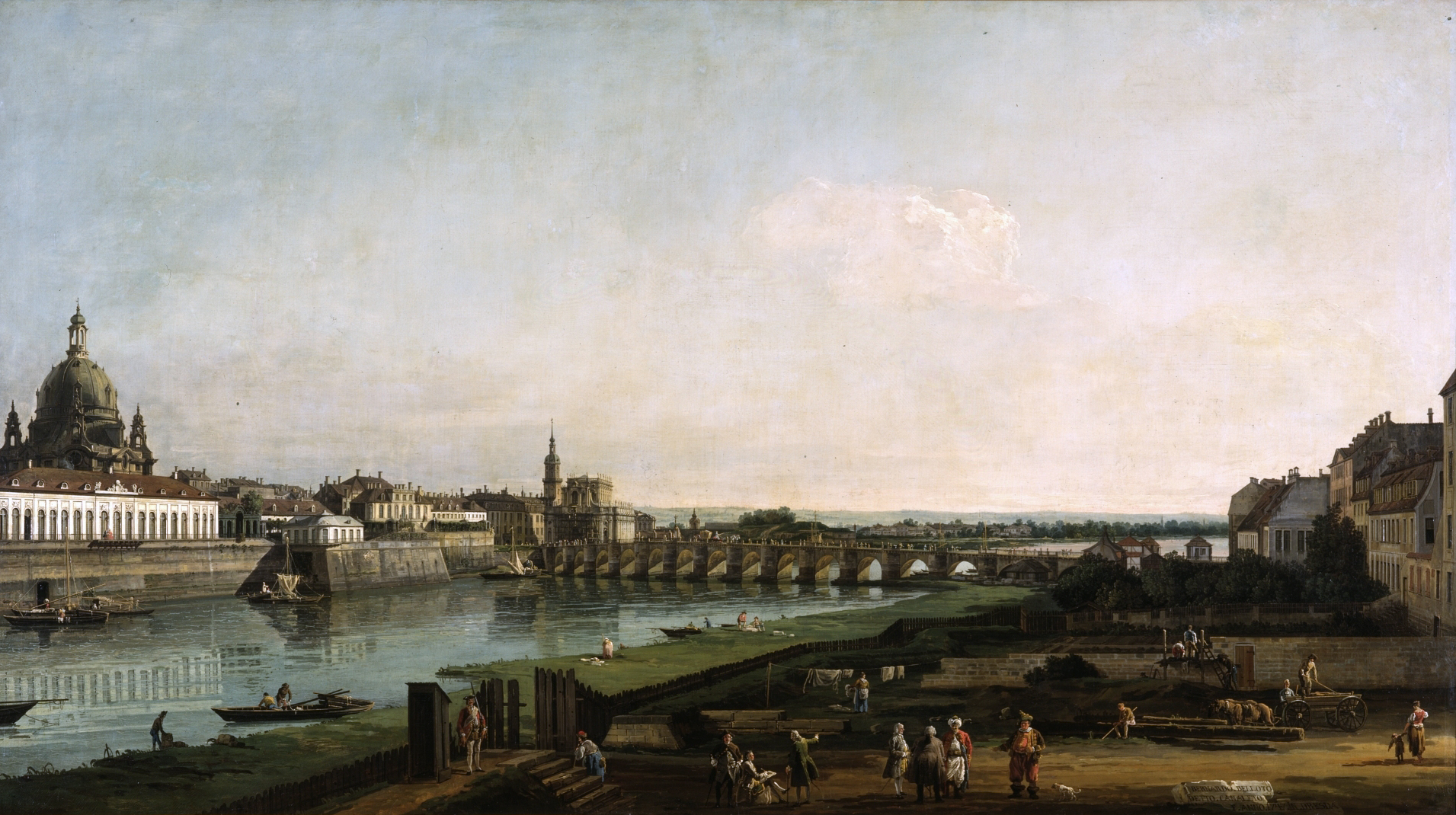
Dresden From the Right Bank of the Elbe Above the Augustus Bridge by the Italian urban landscape painter Bernardo Bellotto

==== Architecture of Dresden ====
Architecture of Dresden

- Dresden school

==== Cinema of Dresden ====
Cinema of Dresden

==== Music of Dresden ====
Music of Dresden

- Music schools in Dresden
  - Hochschule für Musik Carl Maria von Weber
- Music venues in Dresden
  - Semperoper
- Musical compositions written or adapted for Dresden:
  - Around 1728 Jan Dismas Zelenka expanded the Missa Providentiae, originally a Kyrie–Gloria Mass by Antonio Caldara, with a Credo (ZWV 31), Sanctus and Agnus Dei into a Missa tota for use at the then-time Prince-Electoral and Royal-Polish Catholic court in Dresden.
  - Kyrie–Gloria Mass in B minor, BWV 232 I (1733), by Johann Sebastian Bach.
  - Missa Sanctissimae Trinitatis, ZWV 17 (1736), and Missa Votiva, ZWV 18 (1739), by Jan Dismas Zelenka.
- Musical ensembles in Dresden
  - Dresden Philharmonic
  - Dresdner Kammerchor
  - Dresdner Kreuzchor
  - Staatskapelle Dresden

==== Visual arts of Dresden ====
- Die Brücke

Dresden in art / Paintings of Dresden

- Dresden From the Right Bank of the Elbe Above the Augustus Bridge

=== Cuisine of Dresden ===
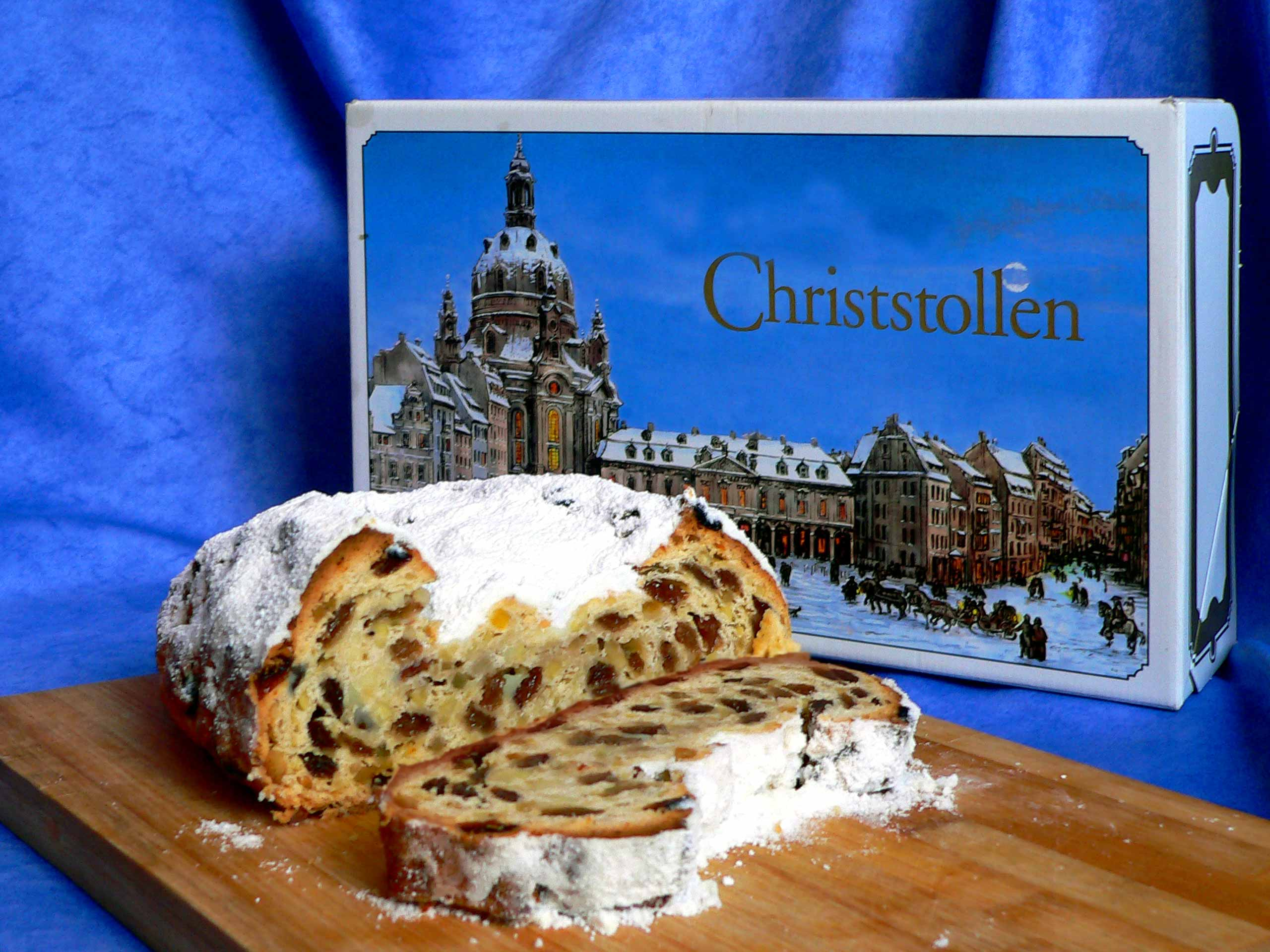
Dresdner Christstollen

Cuisine of Dresden

- Dresdner Stollen

=== People of Dresden ===
- People from Dresden

=== Religion in Dresden ===
- Catholicism in Dresden
  - Roman Catholic Diocese of Dresden-Meissen
    - Bishop of Dresden

=== Sports in Dresden ===
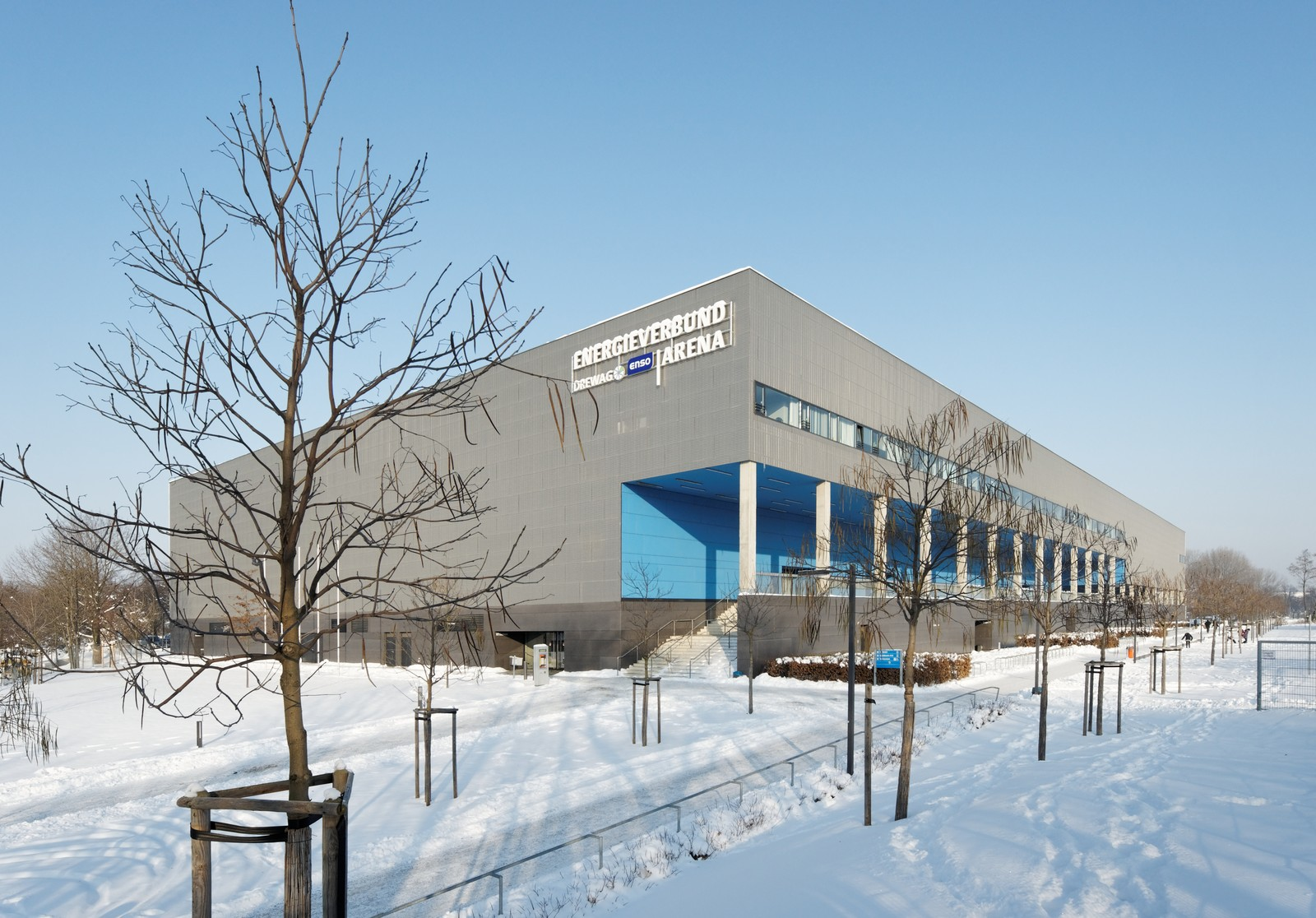
The EnergieVerbund Arena

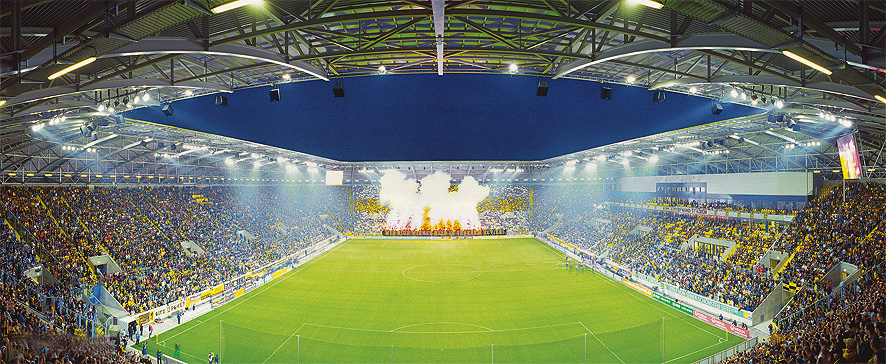
Stadion Dresden, the current home of Dynamo Dresden

Sports in Dresden

- Basketball in Dresden
  - Dresden Titans
- Football in Dresden
  - Dynamo Dresden
    - List of Dynamo Dresden players
    - List of Dynamo Dresden seasons
- Ice hockey in Dresden
  - Dresdner Eislöwen
- Sport venues in Dresden
  - EnergieVerbund Arena
  - Heinz-Steyer-Stadion
  - Ostragehege
  - Stadion Dresden

== Economy and infrastructure of Dresden ==
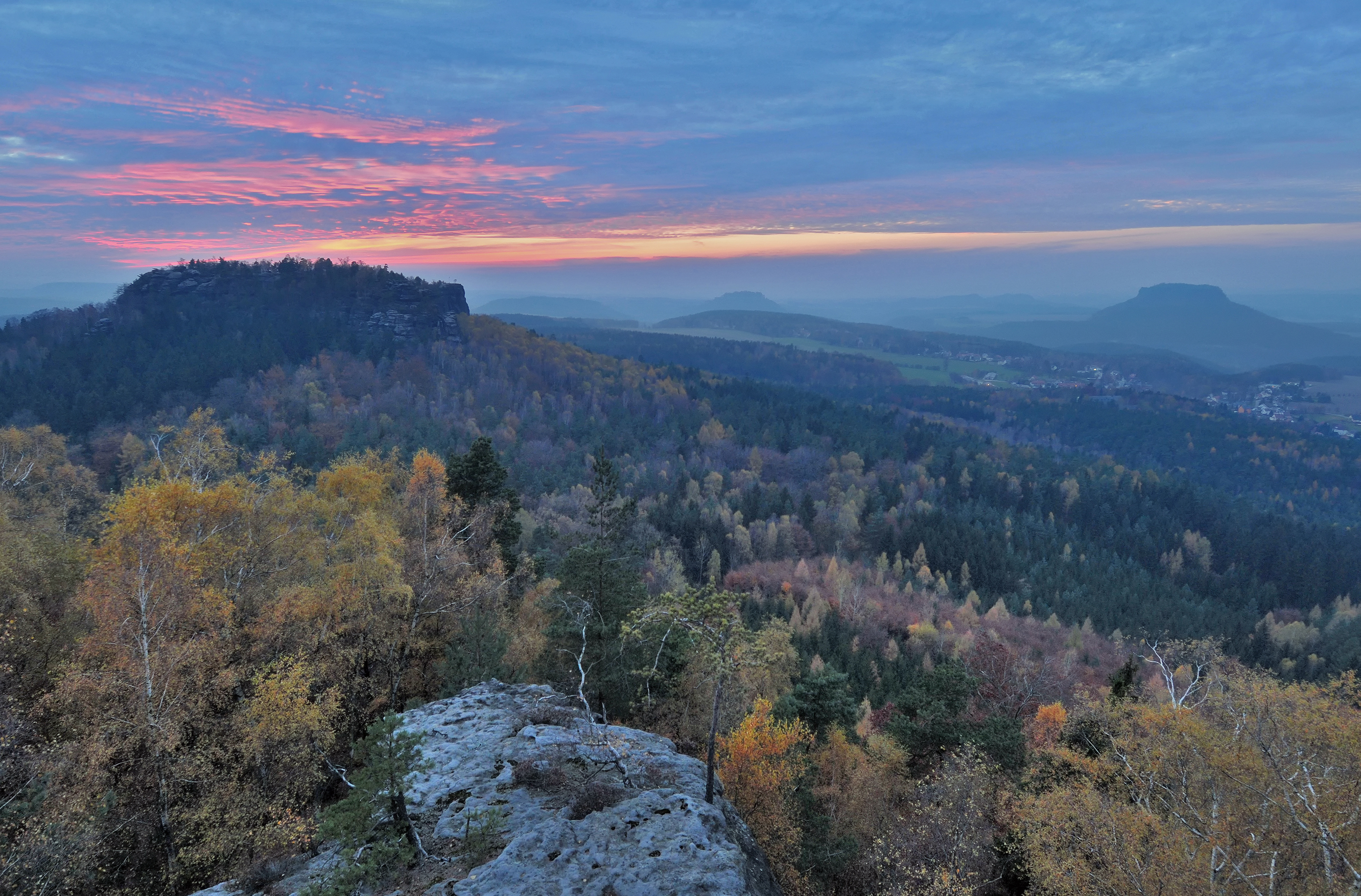
Sunset in Saxon Switzerland, a popular tourist attraction

Economy of Dresden

- Banking in Dresden
  - Dresdner Bank
  - Ostsächsische Sparkasse Dresden
- Industry in Dresden
  - Enterprises in Dresden
- Tourism in Dresden
  - Tourist attractions in Dresden

=== Transport in Dresden ===
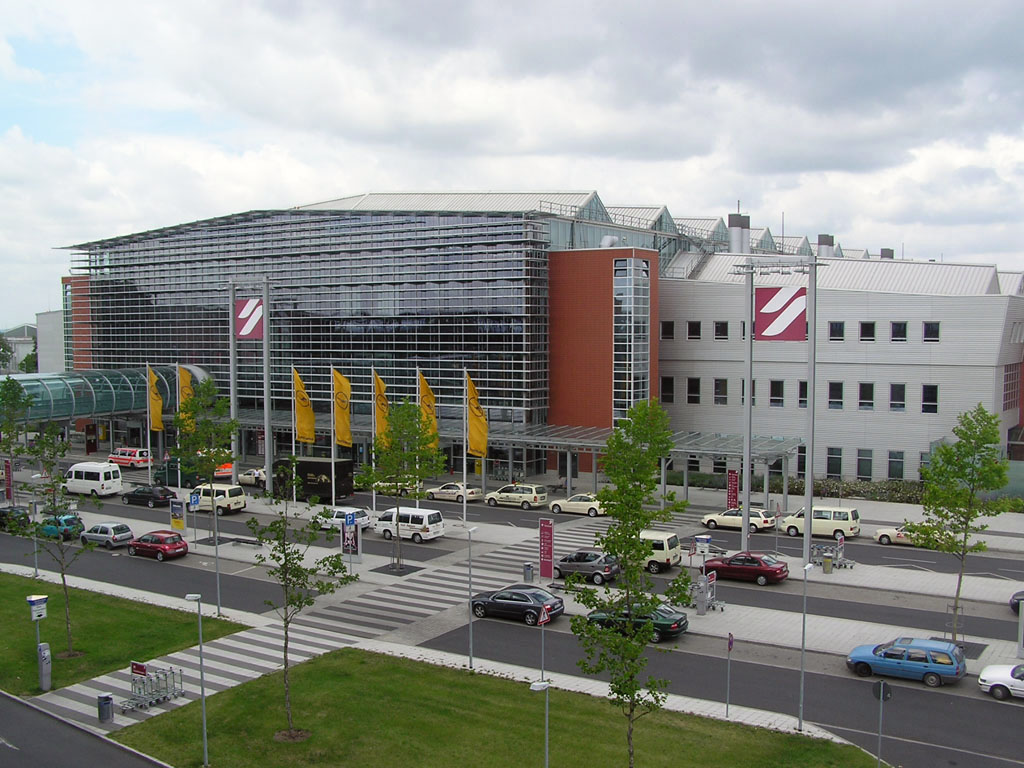
Dresden Airport

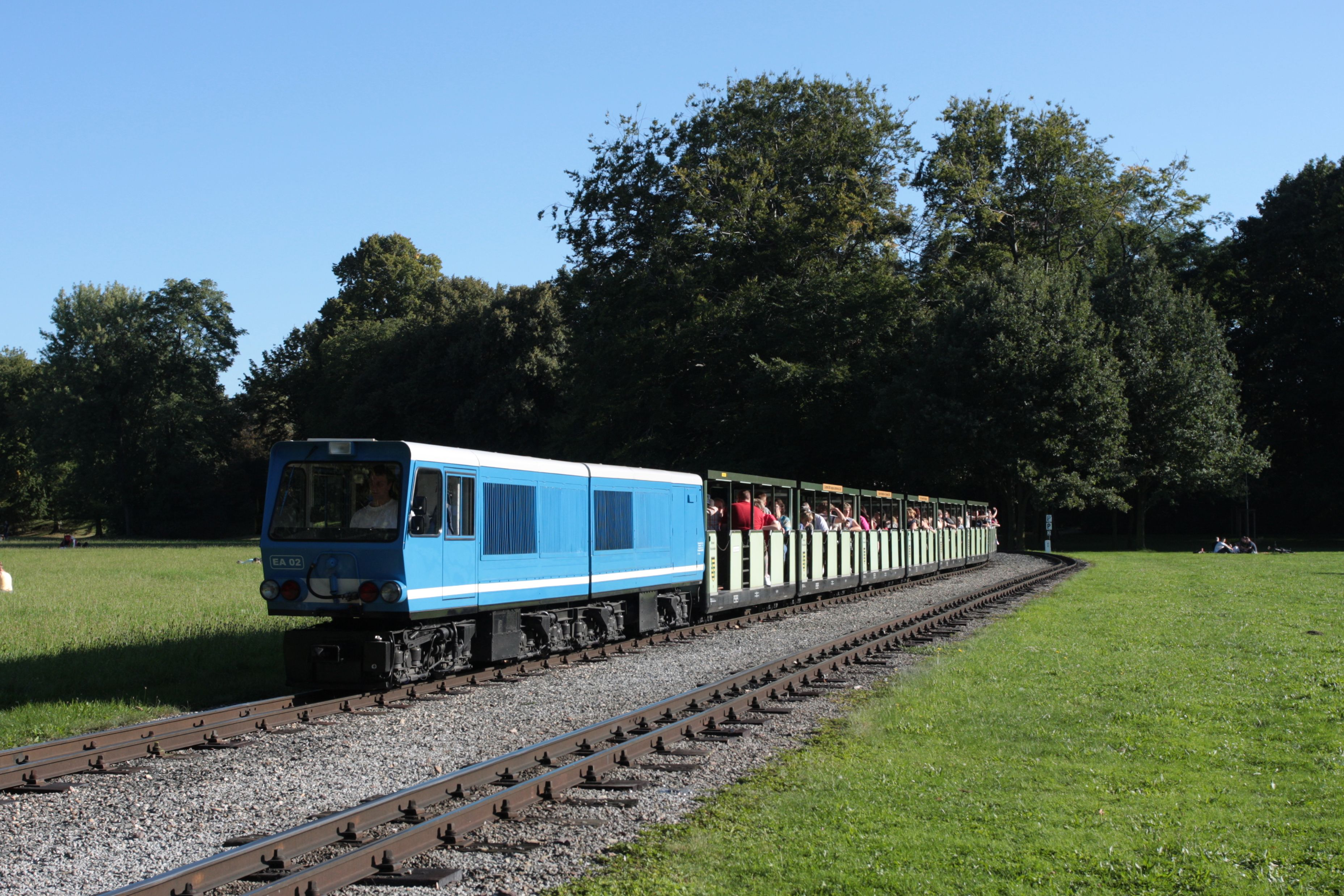
The Dresden Park Railway

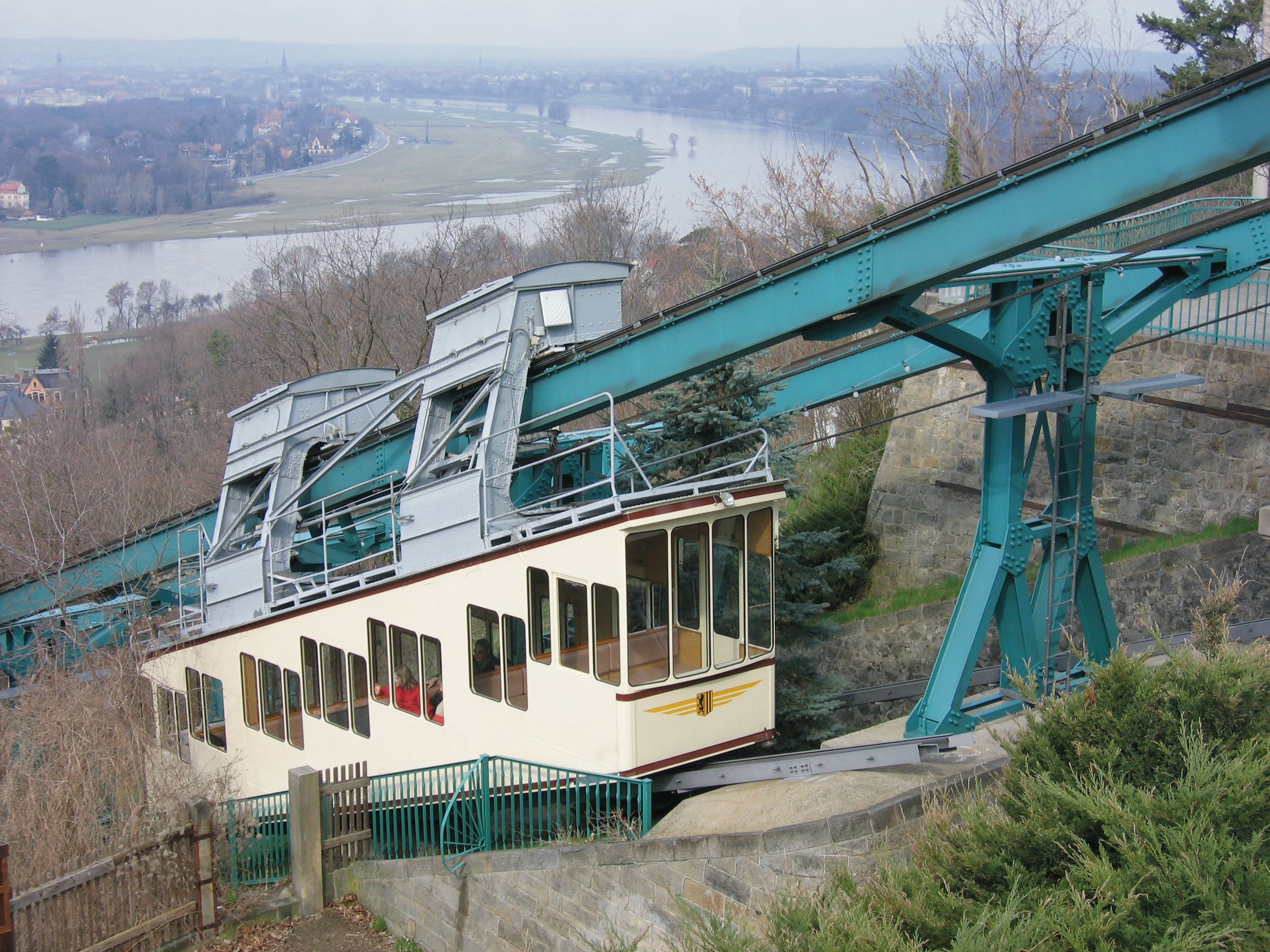
The Dresden Suspension Railway

Transport in Dresden

- Public transport operators
  - Dresdner Verkehrsbetriebe
- Air transport in Dresden
  - Dresden Airport
    - Dresden Flughafen station
- Maritime transport in Dresden
  - Sächsische Dampfschiffahrt
  - Ferries
    - Johannstadt Neustadt Ferry
    - Laubegast Niederpoyritz Ferry
    - Pillnitz Kleinzschachwitz Ferry

==== Rail transport in Dresden ====
- Dresden Funicular Railway
- Dresden Park Railway
- Dresden S-Bahn
  - S-Bahn stations in the Dresden inner city
    - Dresden Hauptbahnhof
    - Dresden Mitte station
    - Dresden-Neustadt station
- Dresden Suspension Railway
- Trams in Dresden
  - CarGoTram

==== Road transport in Dresden ====
- Roads in Dresden

== Education in Dresden ==
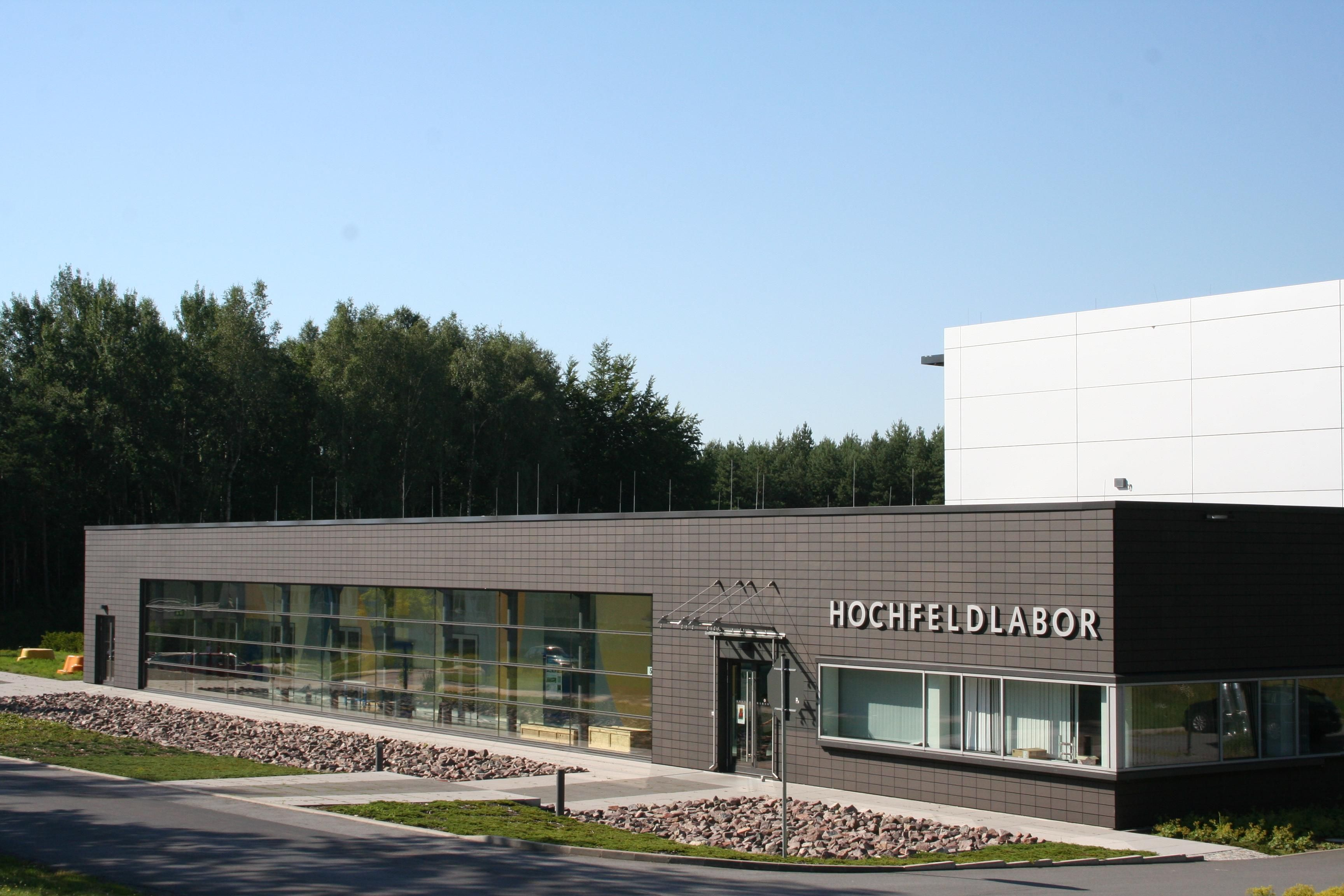
The Dresden High Magnetic Field Laboratory

Education in Dresden

Public education in Dresden

- Secondary education in Dresden
  - Dresden International School
- Institutions of higher education in Dresden
  - Universities in Dresden
    - Dresden Academy of Fine Arts
    - TU Dresden
      - TU Dresden School of International Studies
- Research institutes in Dresden
  - Dresden High Magnetic Field Laboratory
  - Helmholtz-Zentrum Dresden-Rossendorf
  - Leibniz Institute for Polymer Research

== Publications about Dresden ==
- The Destruction of Dresden

== See also ==
- Outline of geography
