= Economy of Dresden =

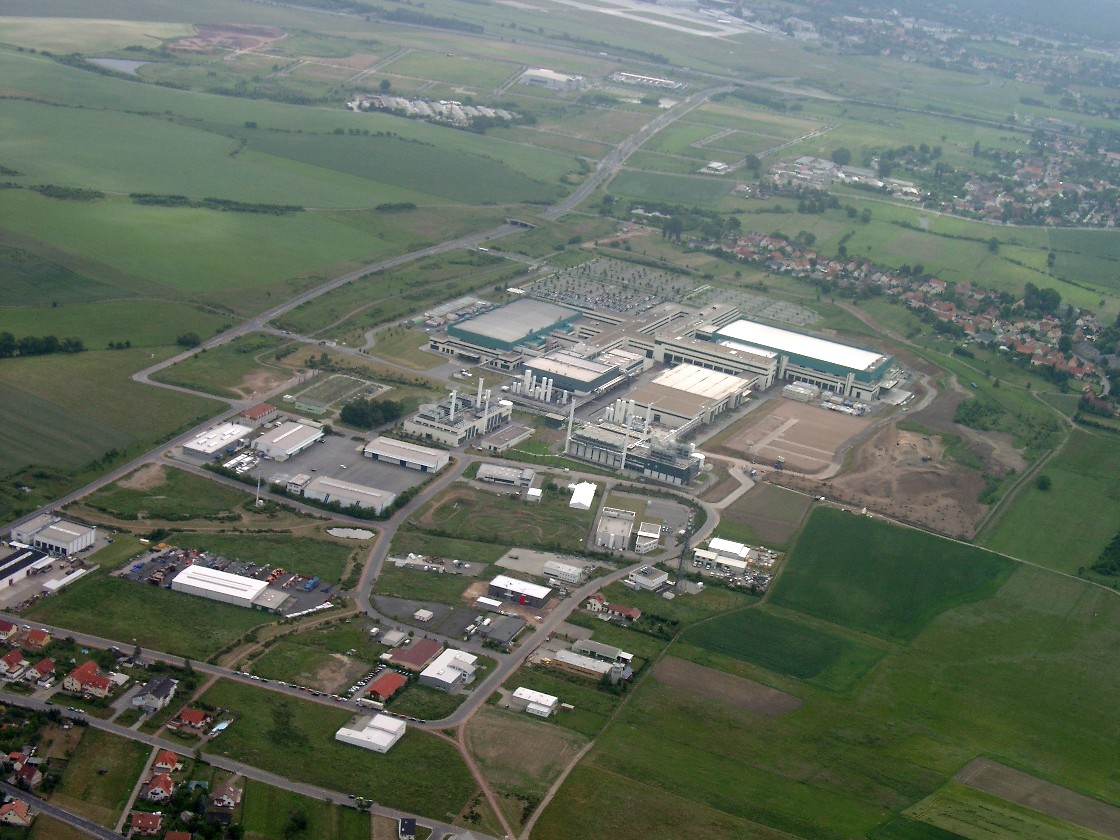
Factories of AMD

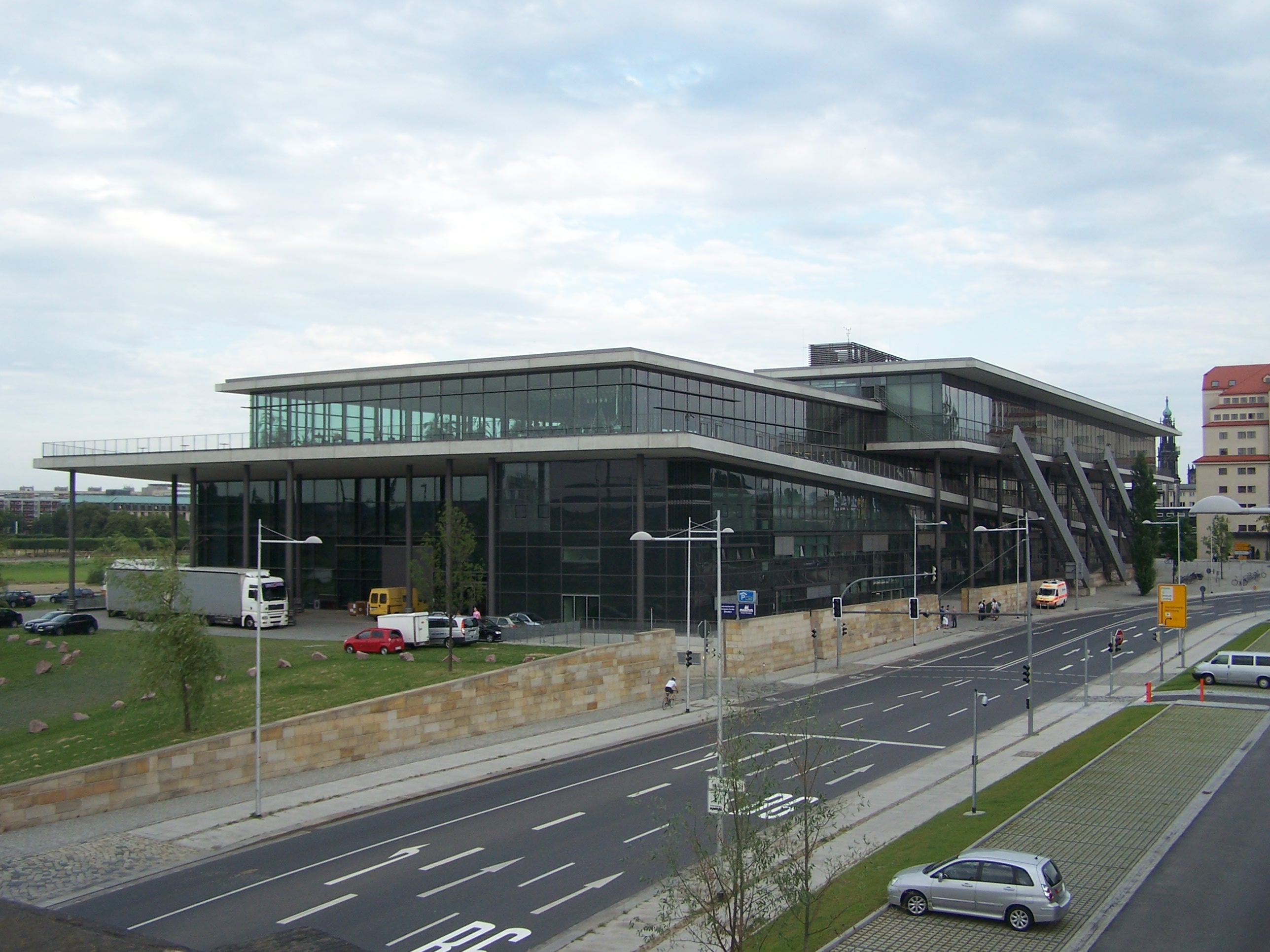
International Congress Center, Dresden

The economy of Dresden and the Dresden agglomeration is one of the most dynamic in Germany, and includes high-tech and applied research.

== Background ==
=== Historical background ===
Many of the industries that made Dresden rich before the Second World War and disappeared under communism have resettled in the city including the optical industry and the high quality foodstuffs industries. An international famous example is the Dresdner Bank that left in the 1950s to avoid, like many other enterprises, its nationalization. Other branches like the microelectronics and aircraft construction came up in the 1960s. Dresden became a centre in the allocation of the former socialist combines that were centrally planned on the one side and had disposal of regional subunits of nationally-owned enterprises.

During the GDR period, Dresden developed into a centre of microelectronics production, leaving a concentration of technical expertise and research institutions. Following German reunification in 1990, many former state-owned industrial enterprises underwent restructuring or closure, while investment in new semiconductor plants contributed to the development of the regional high-technology industry. An economic study published by the Ifo Institute for Economic Research in 2016 found that technology-based manufacturing had been an important driver of Dresden's economic growth during the 1990s and early 2000s, while the service sector had played a major role in stabilising employment.

=== Transportation Infrastructure ===
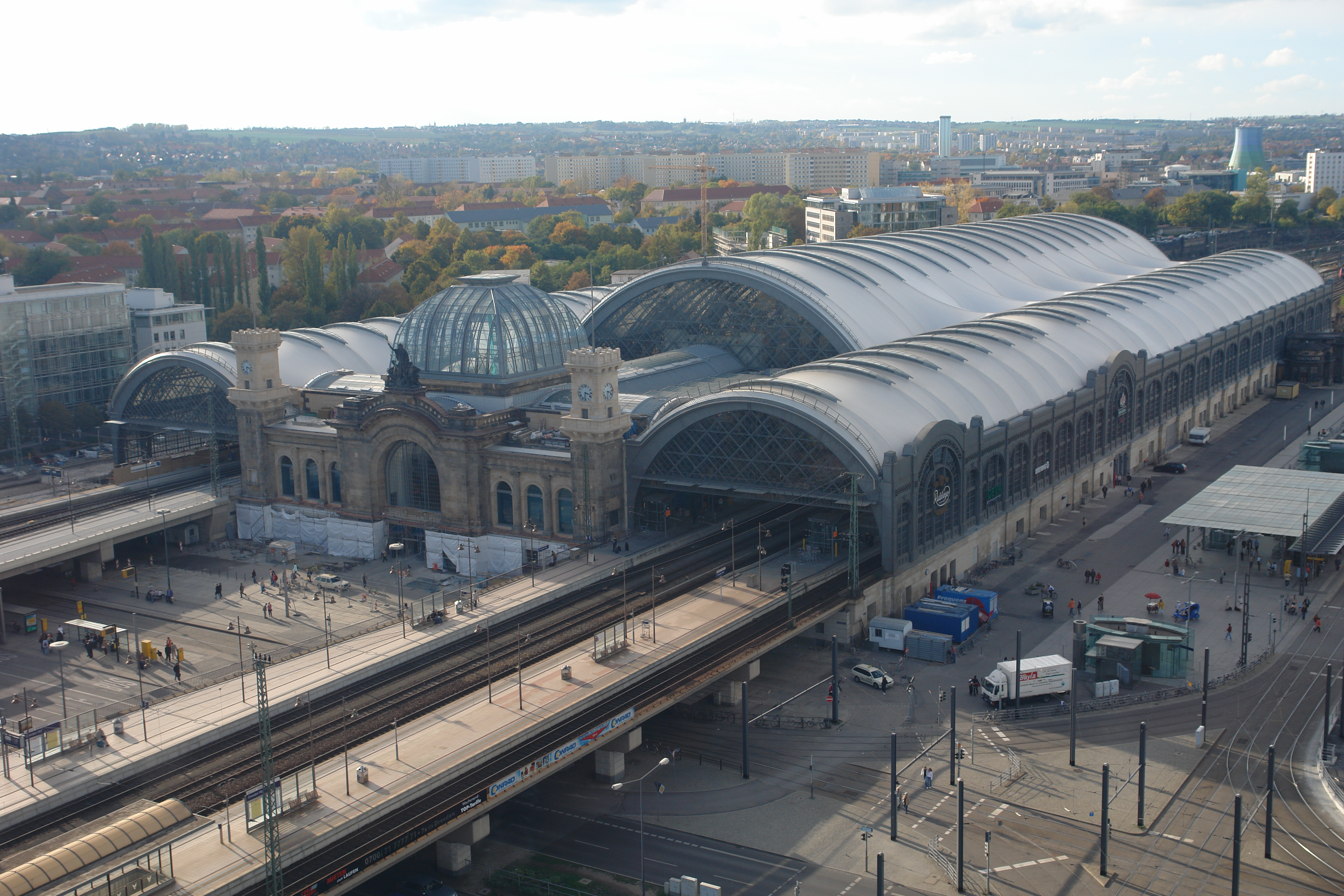
Dresden central station (Dresden Hauptbahnhof)

Dresden is connected in the InterCityExpress and EuroCity train network. Direct lines are running to Berlin, Prague, Frankfurt, Hamburg, Budapest and Vienna. CityNightLine trains are also running to Zürich and Amsterdam among other cities while a EuroNight train serves the Berlin-Dresden-Budapest line.

Dresden has an international airport (Dresden Airport) in the north of the city. The airport is connected by a commuter train line. Scheduled flights are offered to Frankfurt, Munich, Düsseldorf, Vienna and Moscow. Furthermore, there are a lot of touristic flights especially to the Mediterranean Regions.

There is a larger inner harbour in Dresden. The river Elbe waterway connects Dresden with the Hamburg Harbour and Prague. The Midland Canal offers an indirect connection to the Duisport (Duisburg harbour).

Dresden is connected by some longer Bundesautobahns: The A 4 to Frankfurt and Cologne, the A 14 is running to Leipzig and Hannover, the A 13 is running to Berlin and the A 17 is running to Prague.

== Facts and figures ==
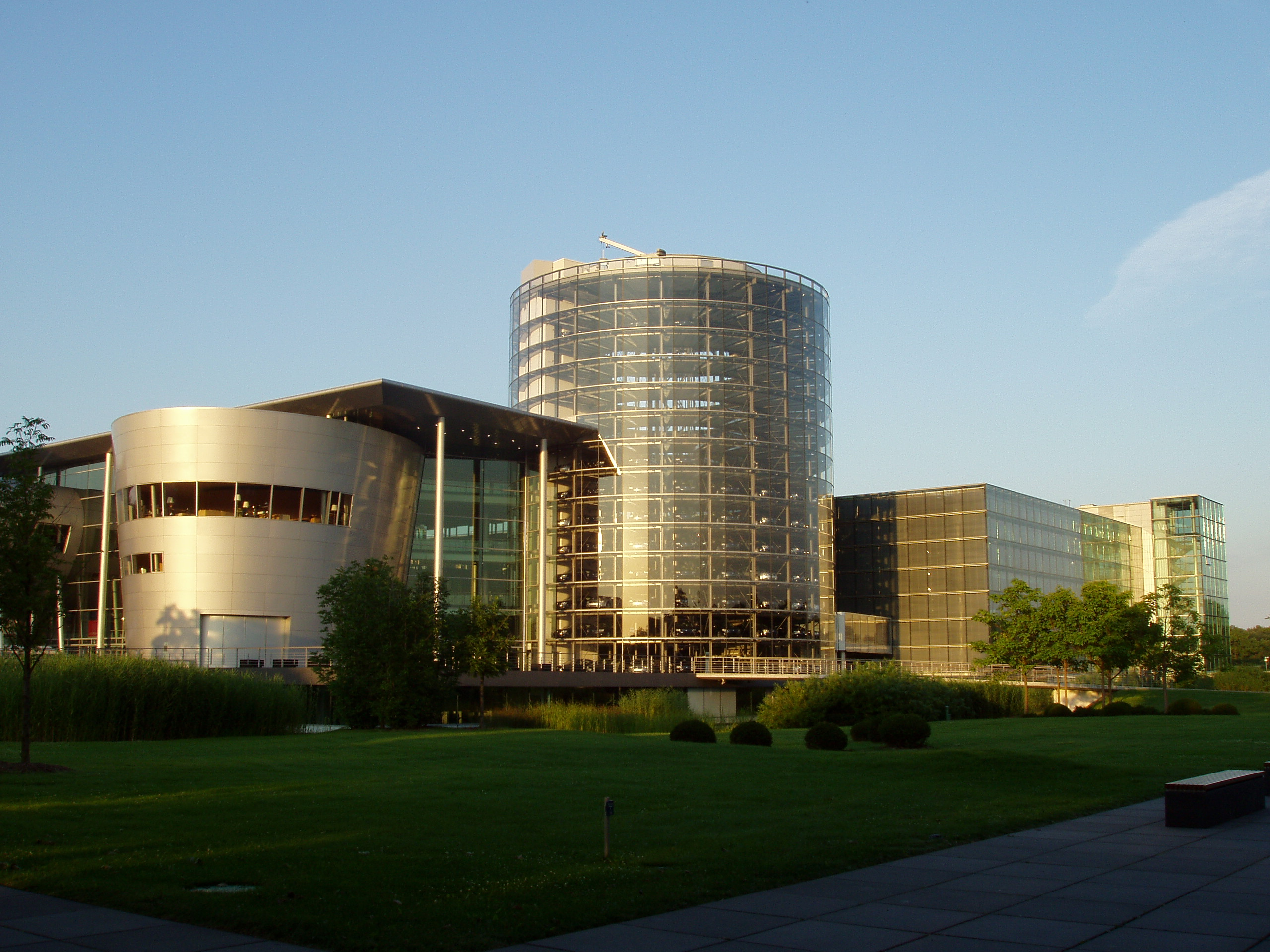
Transparent Factory owned by VW.

Dresden's economy combines a large service sector with specialised manufacturing, particularly in microelectronics and semiconductor production. In June 2024, the city had 281,736 employees subject to social security contributions, including 88,143 in public administration, education, healthcare and social work, compared with 38,328 in producing industries excluding construction. The registered unemployment rate was 7.0% in October 2026.

Thanks to the presence of public administration centres, a high density of semi-public research institutes and an extension of publicly funded high technology sectors, the proportion of highly qualified workers Dresden is again among the highest in Germany and by European criteria.

== Enterprises ==
=== Industrial companies ===
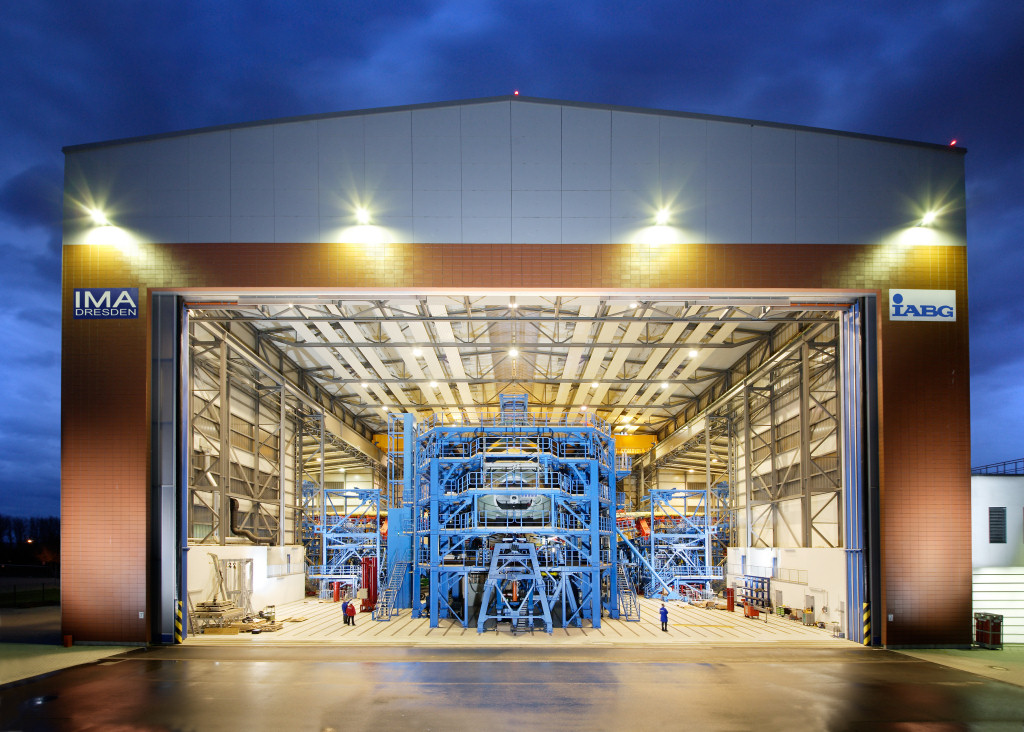
IABG proceeding inanition test of the Airbus A380

Dresden is the centre of the Silicon Saxony microelectronics cluster, which includes semiconductor manufacturers, specialised suppliers and research institutions. GlobalFoundries operates a semiconductor fabrication plant in Dresden, having taken over AMD's manufacturing operations there in 2009. Infineon Technologies opened its €5 billion Smart Power Fab in July 2026 to expand production of power and analogue/mixed-signal semiconductors. Bosch opened a separate 300-mm semiconductor plant in Dresden in 2021, producing chips for automotive and industrial applications. The local supply chain also includes Tekscend Photomask (formerly Toppan Photomasks) and the Advanced Mask Technology Center, which manufactures photolithography masks used in semiconductor production.

The pharmaceutical sector came up at the end of the 19th century. GlaxoSmithKline Biologicals Dresden (former Sächsisches Serumwerk Dresden), is a world leader in vaccine production. Another traditional pharmacy producer is the Arzneimittelwerke Dresden (Pharmaceutical Works, Dresden).

A third (traditional) branch is that of mechanical and electrical engineering. A subsidiary of EADS, the Elbe Flugzeugwerke (Elbe Aircraft Works) is the leading company for rebuilding Airbus passenger aircraft to become freight aircraft.

=== Banks ===
Formed from the merger of Dresdner Volksbank Raiffeisenbank eG and Volksbank Bautzen eG in August 2017, the Volksbank Dresden-Bautzen is the largest cooperative bank in Saxony and the largest in the east outside of Berlin in 2018.

== Media ==
The most important newspaper published in Dresden is the Sächsische Zeitung which has a circulation of around 300,000. The second main newspaper, Dresdner Neueste Nachrichten, is a newspaper with a circulation of about 50,000. The Sächsische Zeitung was established in 1946 and became the press media of the socialist party SED in the district of Dresden until 1990. It is now a much more independent newspaper with a small influence by the social-democratic party.

The Dresdner Neueste Nachrichten has even older origins. It first came out in 1893 and ran until 1943 when its offices were closed down by the Nazis. During GDR times, the same offices produced the newspapers Die Union (the regional press organ of the Christian Democratic Union), the Sächsisches Tageblatt (the regional press organ of the Liberal Democratic Party of Germany) and the Sächsische Neueste Nachrichten (the press organ of the National Democratic Party of Germany). All these newspapers were controlled by Socialist censorship between 1949 and 1990. Die Union was the first newspaper in the GDR that reported about the Monday demonstrations in GDR realistically and freely. In 1990 the newspapers joined back together again and took back on the name Dresdner Neueste Nachrichten; the newspaper celebrated its 110-year anniversary in 2003.

Dresden is the home of the Saxon Broadcasting Center which is a subunit of the Mitteldeutscher Rundfunk and hosts the regional studios. Dresden Fernsehen is a television channel broadcast in Dresden while there are a number of private radio stations broadcasting throughout Saxony.

Another sobriquet of Dresden is connected with the media: Because citizens of Dresden were not able to receive (uncensored) television programmes broadcast in the former western states during Socialist times, Dresden gained the name "Tal der Ahnungslosen" which means "Valley of the Clueless". The television channel ARD was known as "Außer Raum Dresden" ("except the Dresden area").

== See also ==
- Economic history of Germany
