= Schillerplatz =

Schillerplatz may refer to:

- Schillerplatz (Stuttgart)
- Schillerplatz (Mainz)
- Schillerplatz (Dresden)
- Schillerplatz (Vienna)
