= Dresden Fernsehen =

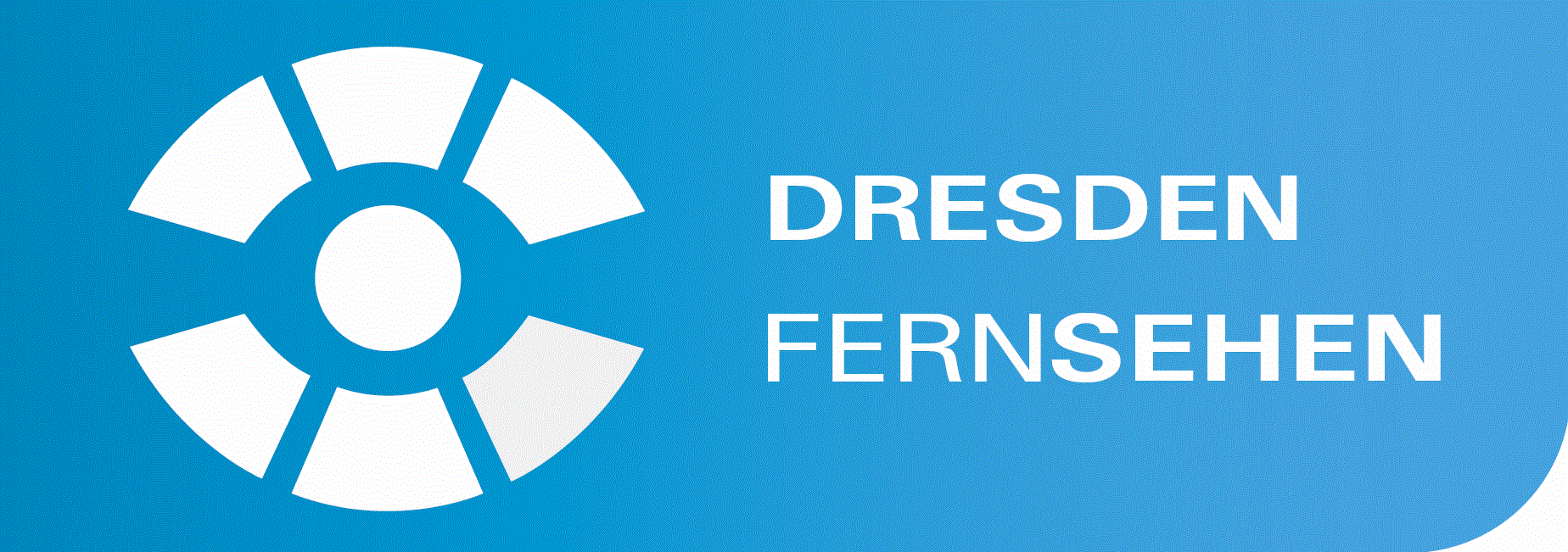
- Saxony; Germany
- City: Dresden

Ownership
- Owner: Fernsehen in Dresden GmbH (FiD)

History
- First air date: 10 June 1996

Technical information
- Licensing authority: Bundesnetzagentur

Links
- Website: https://www.sachsen-fernsehen.de/kategorie/dresden/

Dresden Fernsehen is the local television station serving the city of Dresden capital of Saxony and the surrounding areas.

== History ==
For the first time, on 10 June 1996 the channel went on the air as a stand-alone program after broadcasting regularly on the Dresdner frequency of RTL (Regionalfenster 18: 00-18: 30 o'clock), later VOX, the regional broadcast "Drehscheibe Dresden" has been. At the beginning the program of Dresden Fernsehen consisted of the hourly repeated turntable as well as a screen newspaper with music. In the meantime, a joint program of Saxon conurbations (Dresden Fernsehen, Leipzig Fernsehen, Chemnitz Fernsehen) was organized by Sachsen Fernsehen GmbH & Co. Fernseh-Betriebs KG under the name Sachsen Fernsehen. At this time, some older series, such as, E.g. Ein Bayer auf Rügen, and films by the Kirch Group.

Until the end of 2016, Sachsen Fernsehen GmbH & Co. Fernseh-Betriebs KG still had the broadcasting license of the Saxon State Media Institute for Local Television in Dresden, but had transferred its production to regional partners after financial difficulties. By the end of 2005, the company ElbTV Film und Fernsehproduktion GmbH had been producing programs for the station. Since January 2006, the program has been produced by Fernsehen in Dresden GmbH. Since the beginning of 2017 Fernsehen in Dresden GmbH GmbH is also the owner of the broadcast license. Since January 2017 television in Dresden GmbH has also been responsible for the toneless passenger TV in the Dresden trams. Around 231,000 use the tram system every day.
