= Dresdner Neueste Nachrichten =

- Type: Weekly newspaper
- Founded: 1990
- Language: German
- Headquarters: Dresden, Germany
- Country: Germany
- Website: www.dnn.de

Dresdner Neueste Nachrichten (DNN) is a regional newspaper that appears in the city of Dresden and its surroundings. It is the third largest newspaper in the region after the Sächsische Zeitung and the Dresdner Morgenpost. The sold circulation amounts to 20,432 copies, a decrease of 48,1 per cent since 1998. The newspaper celebrated its 110-year anniversary in 2003.

== Earlier publication ==
A newspaper with the title Dresdner Neueste Nachrichten appeared in 1893, but it was discontinued in 1943 by the Nazis. During GDR times, the same office produced the newspapers Die Union (the regional press organ of the Christian Democratic Union), the Sächsisches Tageblatt (the regional press organ of the Liberal Democratic Party of Germany) and the Sächsische Neueste Nachrichten (the press organ of the National Democratic Party of Germany). All these newspapers were controlled by Socialist censorship between 1949 and 1990. Die Union was the first newspaper in the GDR that reported about the Monday demonstrations in GDR realistically and freely. In 1990 the newspapers joined back together again and took back on the name Dresdner Neueste Nachrichten.
