= Schillerplatz (Dresden) =

Square in Dresden, Germany

Coordinates: 51.0521°N 13.8069°E

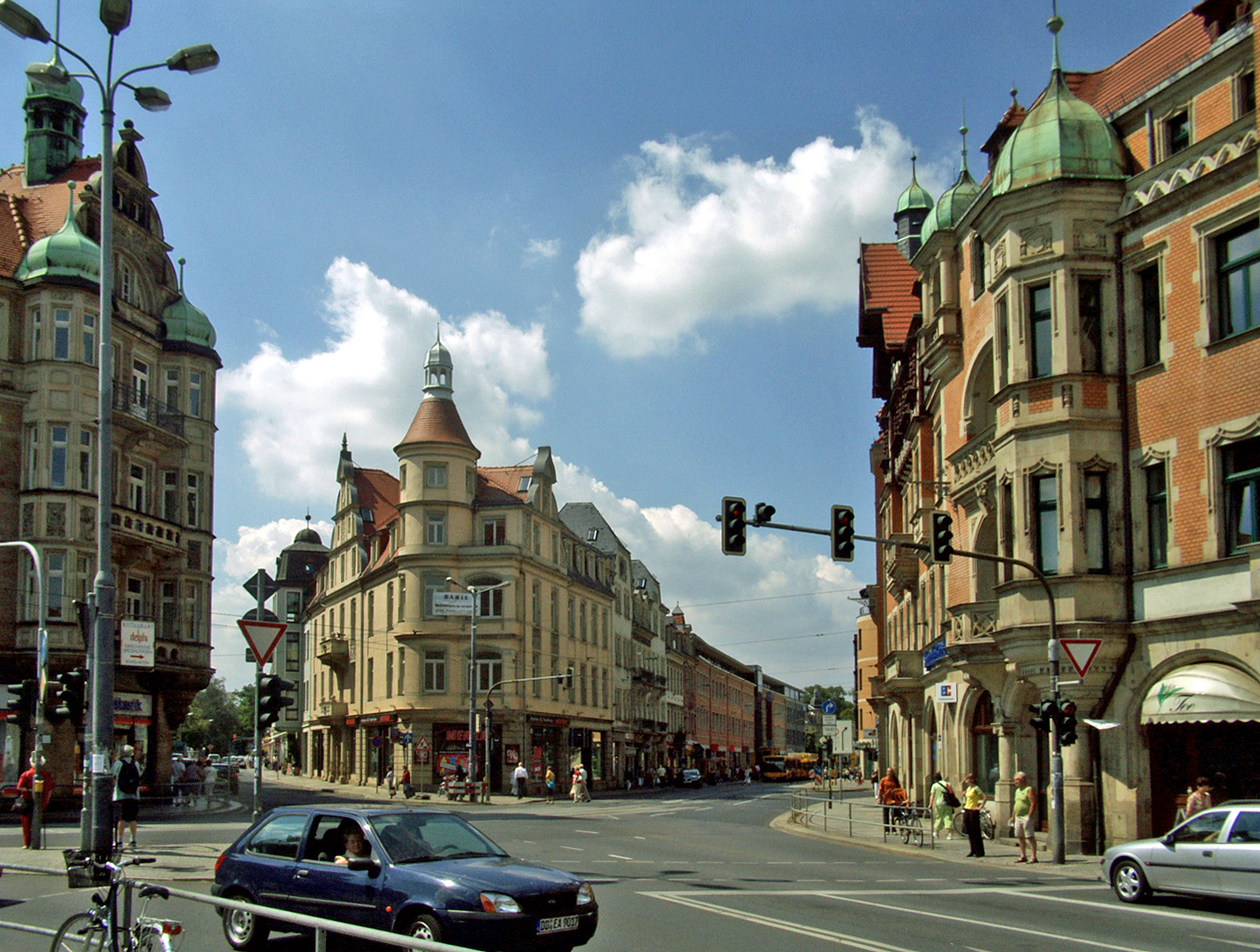
Schillerplatz

The Schillerplatz (German pronunciation: [ˈʃɪlɐˌplats], lit. 'Schiller Square') is a cobblestoned square in Blasewitz part of Dresden, Germany. A square has been named after Friedrich Schiller, a German dramatist, poet, and historian.

During the World War II, the buildings around Schillerplatz, including the Collegiate Church, the Fruchtkasten, the Prinzenbau, the Old Chancellery and the Old Castle were destroyed by fire and reconstructed after the war. The square is used for many events such as the Christmas market and music festivals.
