= Sächsische Zeitung =

German newspaper in Dresden, Saxony

- Type: Daily newspaper
- Format: Rhenish
- Owner(s): Dresdner Druck- & Verlagshaus GmbH & Co. (Gruner + Jahr 60%, Deutsche Druck- und Verlagsgesellschaft 40%)
- Editor: Uwe Vetterick
- Founded: 13 April 1946; 79 years ago
- Headquarters: Dresden, Germany
- Website: sz-online.de

Sächsische Zeitung (pronounced [ˈzɛksɪʃə ˈtsaɪtʊŋ]; "Saxon Newspaper") is a regional German daily newspaper. The paper is published in Dresden. Its circulation is around 227.940, a fall of around 40% since 1998. Around 93% of copies sold are delivered to subscribers. Despite the name, the paper is mainly distributed in east Saxony. The paper's circulation is around ten times that of its main competitor, the Dresdner Neueste Nachrichten, which is part-owned by one of the owners of the Sächsische Zeitung itself. The company which owns the paper, Dresdner Druck- & Verlagshaus GmbH & Co. is itself majority owned by Gruner + Jahr. The remaining 40% is owned by Deutsche Druck- und Verlagsgesellschaft, which is wholly owned by the Social Democratic Party of Germany. It is published in Rhenish format.

== History ==
Sächsische Zeitung was established in 1946. The paper carried the subtitle Organ der Bezirksleitung Dresden der Sozialistischen Einheitspartei Deutschlands ("organ of the Dresden Regional Administration of the Socialist Unity Party of Germany") from 1946 to 1990. The paper was privatized in 1991.

== Circulation ==
The circulation of Sächsische Zeitung has been falling steadily. It was 459,000 copies during the third quarter of 1992. In 2001 the paper had a circulation of 340,000 copies and 880,000 readers. Its circulation was 317,689 copies in 2002. It was 294,204 copies in the first quarter of 2006.
