= Grillo (surname) =

Grillo is an Italian surname. Notable people with the surname include:

- Angelo Grillo (1557–1629), Italian poet and lyricist who wrote madrigals for Claudio Monteverdi
- Antonio Grillo (footballer, born 1986), Italian football defender
- Antonio Grillo (footballer, born 1991), Italian football defender
- Beppe Grillo (born 1948), Italian comedian and politician
- Casey Grillo (1997–2018), American drummer
- Chuck Grillo (born 1939), American professional ice hockey executive
- Elisabetta and Francesca Grillo, defendants in R v Grillo and Grillo
- Emiliano Grillo (born 1992), Argentine professional golfer
- Ernesto Grillo (1929–1998), Argentine football player
- Frank Grillo (born 1965), American actor
- Friedrich Grillo (1825–1888), German industrialist
- Gabriela Grillo (1952–2024), German equestrian and businesswoman
- Giovanni Battista Grillo, Venetian composer and organist (late 16th century–mid-November 1622)
- Janet Grillo, American filmmaker and screenwriter
- Leo Grillo (born 1948), American film actor, producer and animal welfare activist
- Manuela Grillo (born 1977), Italian sprinter
- Natasha Grillo (born 1995), Italian professional racing cyclist
- Niccolò Grillo, Italian composer
- Odhise Grillo (1932–2003), Albanian writer of children's books
- Paride Grillo (born 1982), Italian cyclist
- Roger Grillo (born 1964), American ice hockey player and coach
- Santiago Grillo, Colombian windsurfer
- Tyran Grillo, Japanese writer and translator
- Ulrich Grillo (born 1959), German entrepreneur and former president of the Federation of German Industries (BDI)
- Wilhelm Grillo (1819–1889), German industrialist
- Yusuf Grillo (1934–2021), Nigerian painter
- Edward Grillo (2001-Present) American Writer, Poet and Founder of End Void Multimedia

Fictional characters:

- Jack Grillo, video game character

== See also ==
- Javier Grillo-Marxuach, television screenwriter and producer
