= Antonio Grillo =

Antonio Grillo may refer to:

- Antonio Grillo (footballer, born 1986), Italian football defender
- Antonio Grillo (footballer, born 1991), Italian football midfielder
