= Gelsenkirchen-Schalke =

Schalke
- Quarter of Gelsenkirchen
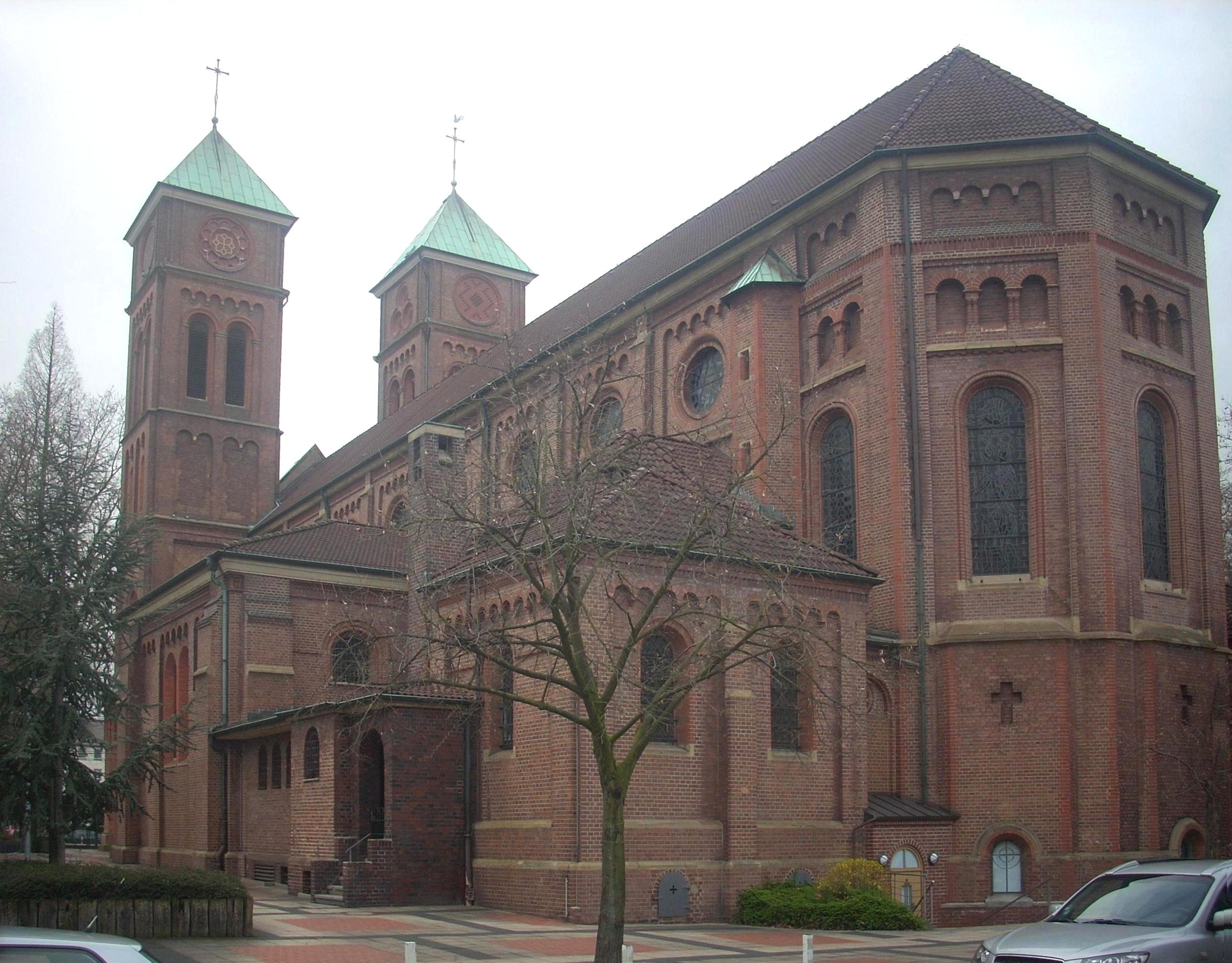
- Catholic St Joseph's Church

- Coat of arms

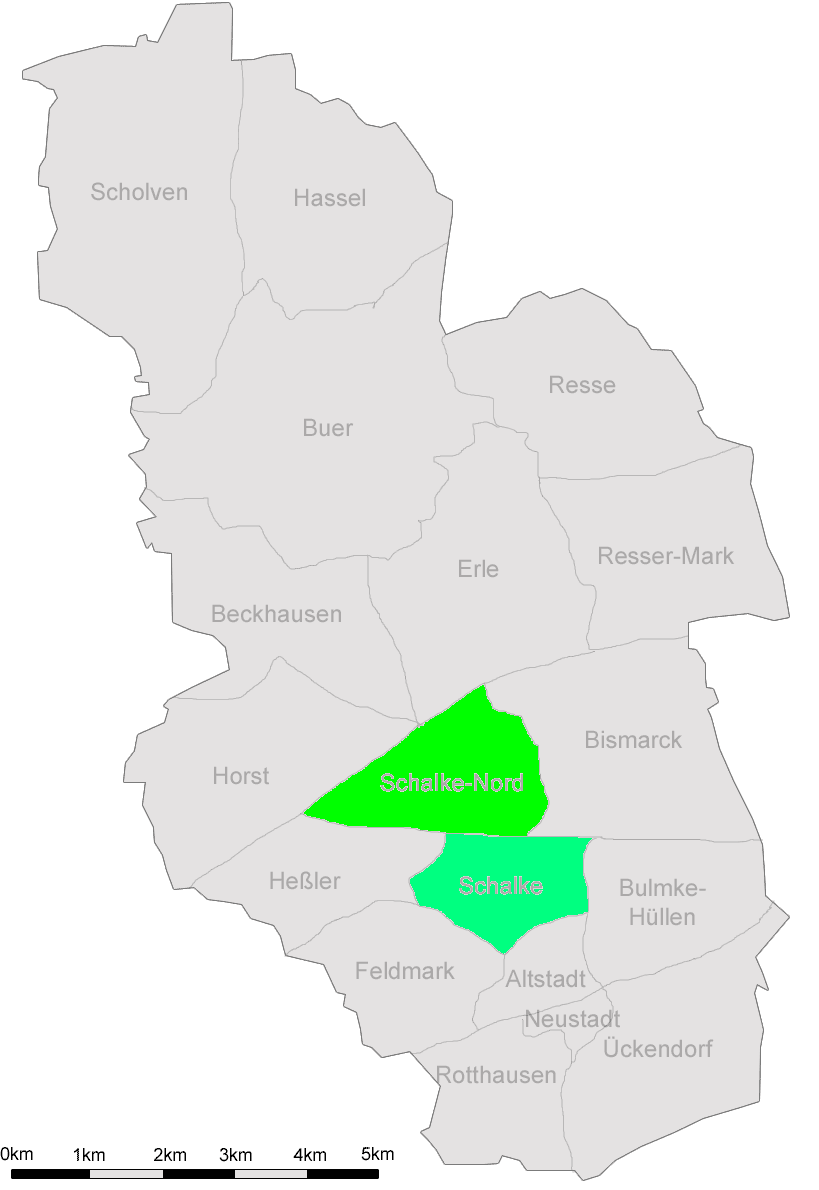
- Location of Schalke within Gelsenkirchen
- Interactive map of Schalke
- Location within Germany Location within North Rhine-Westphalia
- Coordinates: 51°31′20″N 7°5′19″E
- Country: Germany
- State: North Rhine-Westphalia
- District: Gelsenkirchen-Mitte
- City: Gelsenkirchen

Area
  - Total: 2.968 km^{2} (1.146 sq mi)

Population (2022-12-31)
  - Total: 22,278
  - Density: 7,506/km^{2} (19,440/sq mi)
- Time zone: UTC+01:00 (CET)
  - Summer (DST): UTC+02:00 (CEST)
- Dialling codes: 45881
- Vehicle registration: GE

Gelsenkirchen-Schalke is a quarter of Gelsenkirchen. In its current boundaries, it has an area of 2.968 square kilometres and 21,510 inhabitants (as of 31 December 2022). Thanks to the local football club FC Schalke 04, the district is at least as well known nationally as the city of Gelsenkirchen. However, Schalke 04 has played its matches in the Erle district since 1973 (first in the Parkstadion, since 2001 in the Arena AufSchalke).

== Geography ==
Today's Schalke district is bordered to the north for 2.1 kilometers by the Duisburg-Ruhrort-Dortmund railway line, to the north-west for just under 1 km by the A 42 motorway, to the west for 400 m by Hans-Böckler-Allee, to the south-west for 1.5 km by another railway line, to the south for 1 km by Florastrasse and to the east for 1.1 km by Bismarckstrasse. To the north of Schalke is the district Schalke-Nord, whose name is mainly justified by the fact that the Schalke railway station and the Glückauf-Kampfbahn are located in it.

== History ==
The name of this village had several spellings in the past: Scedelike, Sceleke, Scadelik, Schadelick, Schalicke, Schalecke, Schalcke. This is how the name Schalke came about over the centuries. The name probably referred to a small settlement and meant something like "area around the skull" or "settlement in a skull-shaped area".

The first documented bearer of this name was a nobleman in 1246: Henricus miles de Schadeleke (Heinrich von Schalke). Later there was also the knight Cesarius van Schedelike. The noble family was mentioned in documents from Essen Abbey, but the male line died out in the 17th century.

In the 19th century, the farming community quickly became an industrial town. The industrialist Friedrich Grillo played a leading role in this. From 1848 onwards, several exploratory drillings were carried out in the Schalker Mark, which suggested that there were rich deposits of hard coal in the area around Schalke and the neighbouring farming communities. In 1862, the various trades were merged to form a consolidation coal mine trade union (Zeche Consolidation).

In 1872, Friedrich Grillo founded the Aktiengesellschaft für Chemische Industrie, the Schalker Gruben- und Hüttenverein and the Schalker Eisenhütte in Schalke. A year later, he founded the Glas- und Spiegel-Manufaktur AG, also here. In 1876, the Schalker Gymnasium was founded. On 1 April 1903, the town was merged into Gelsenkirchen.

The nationally renowned football club FC Schalke 04 was founded in 1904 under the original name Westfalia Schalke. Before the First World War, Schalke was one of the towns characterized by immigration from Masuria, which gave it the nickname "Little Ortelsburg". Numerous FC Schalke players had Masurian roots. In the 21st century coal mining has ended, but the district of Schalke is still shaped by immigration, with 45% of the population having an immigrant background.

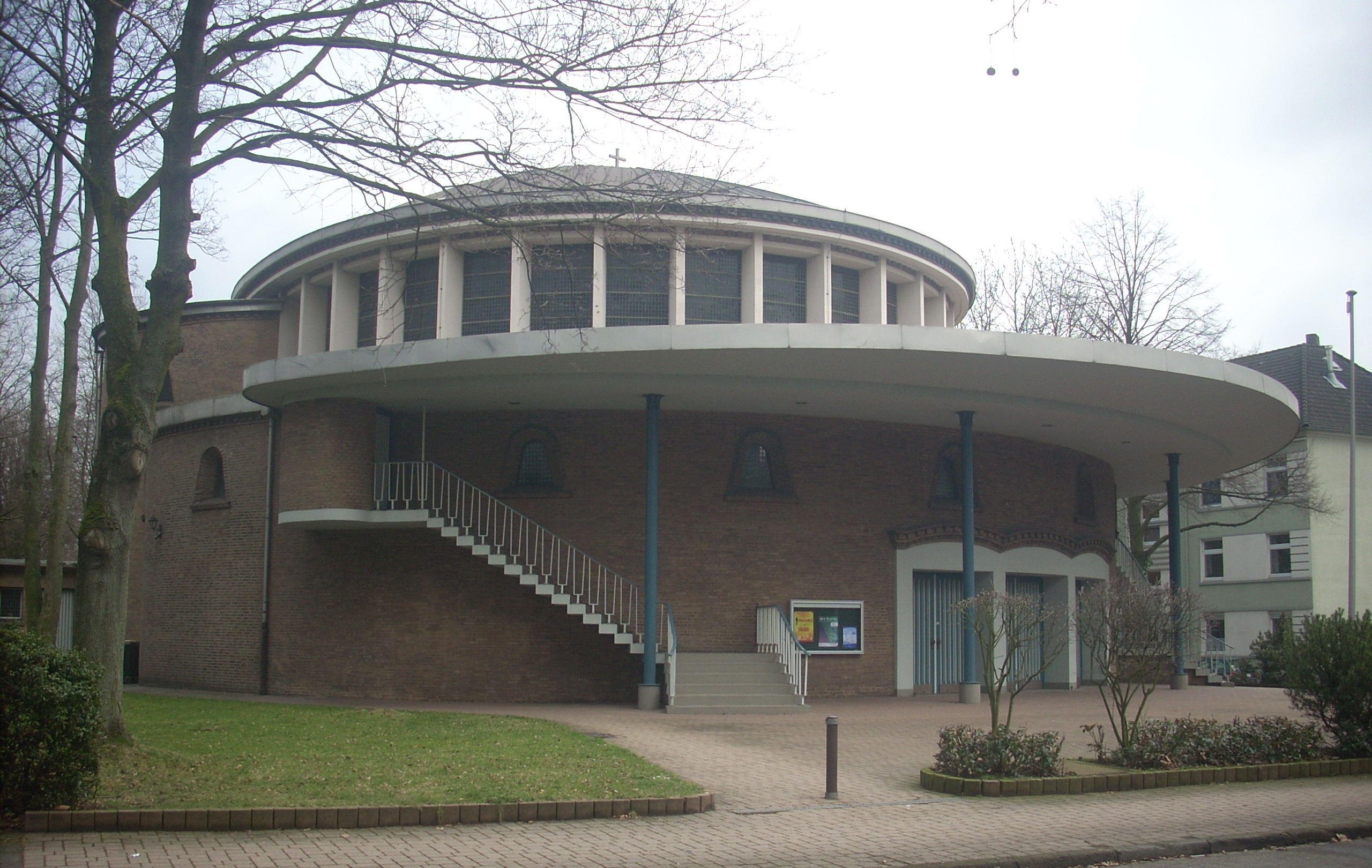
Protestant Schalke-Friedenskirche

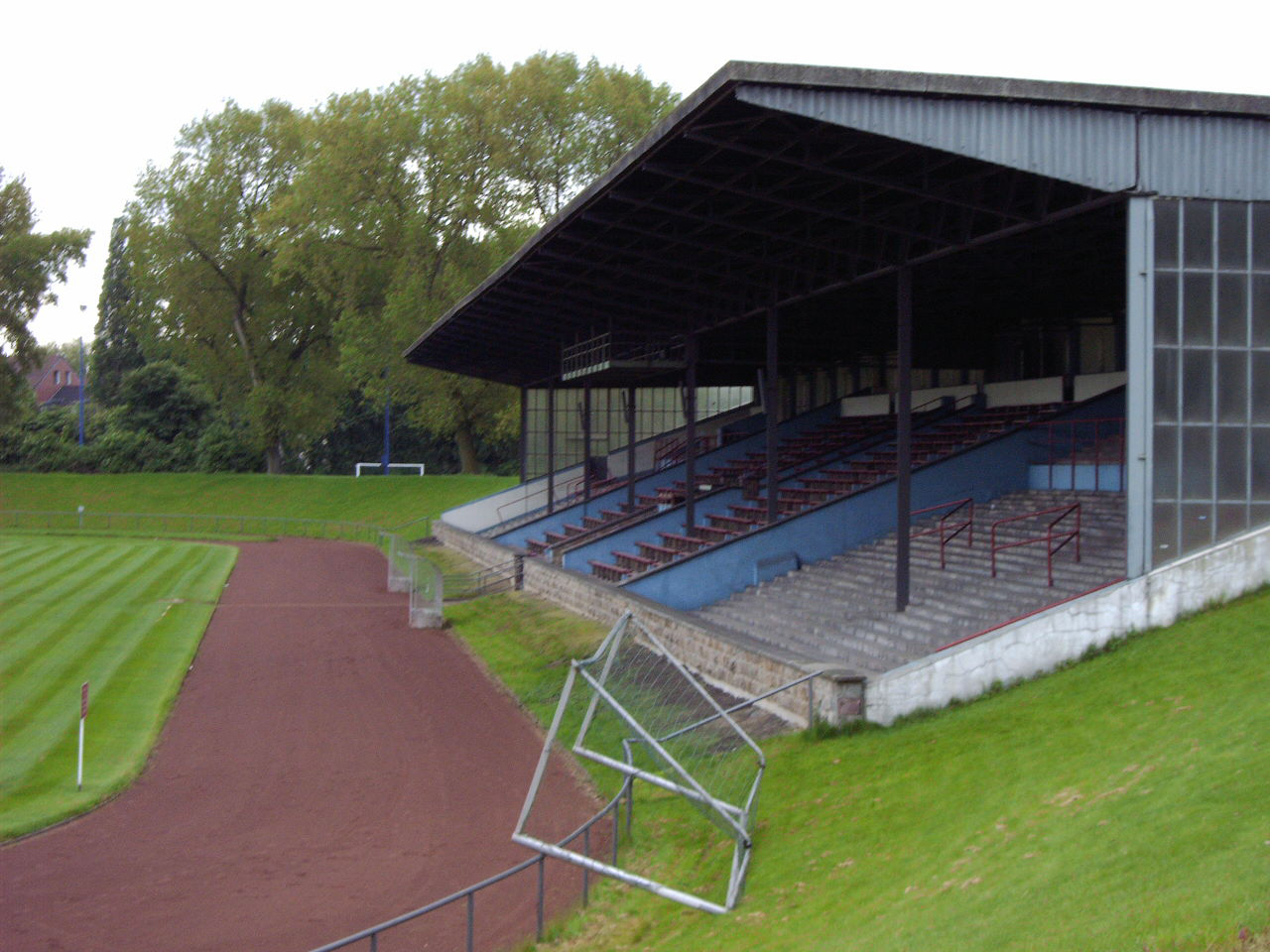
Glückauf-Kampfbahn in Schalke North
