= Grillo (disambiguation) =

Grillo is a white wine grape variety.

Grillo may also refer to:

- Grillo (surname)
- Grillo telephone
- Grillo-Theater
- Cricket (insect), the Italian and Spanish word for the cricket
- Grillo (futsal player)
- Il grillo, nickname of Paolo Bettini (born 1974), Italian cyclist

== See also ==
- Il Grillo Parlante
- Il Marchese del Grillo
- El Grillo (disambiguation)
