= CarGoTram =

Former VW factory parts supply tram in Dresden, Germany

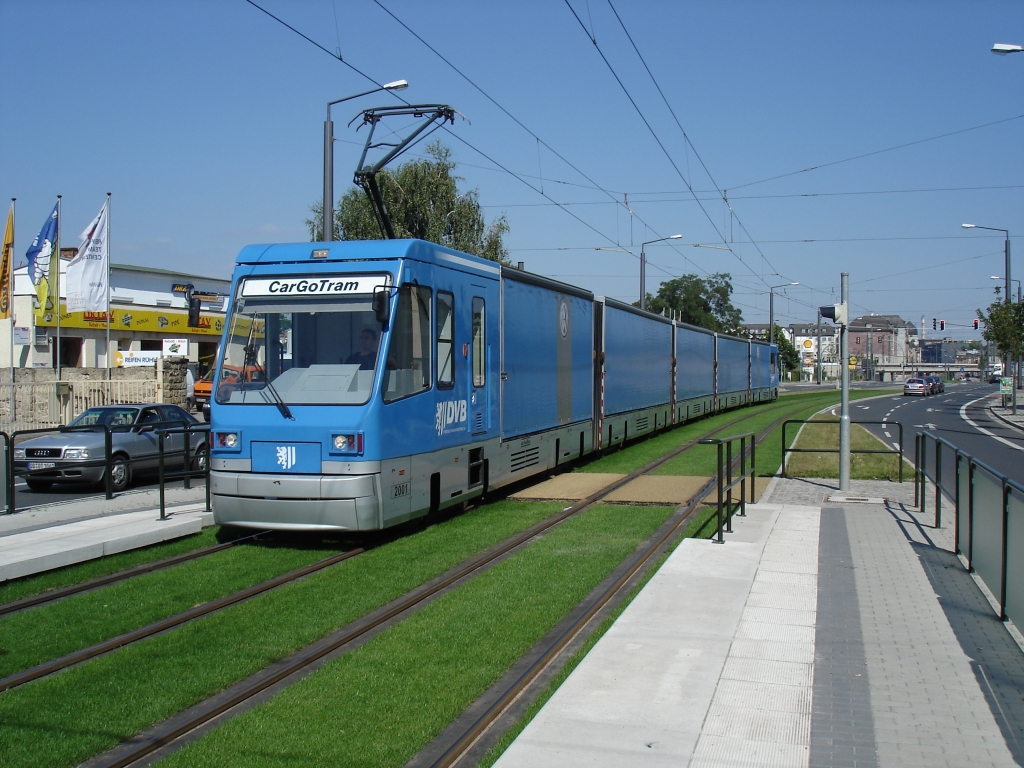
- The CarGoTram
- Manufacturer: Schalker Eisenhütte; Maschinenfabrik GmbH
- Constructed: 2000
- Number built: 2
- Formation: 5 EMU + 7 middle carriages

Specifications
- Train length: 59,400 mm (194 ft 10 5/8 in)
- Width: 2,200 mm (86 5/8 in)
- Maximum speed: 50 km/h (31 mph)
- Weight: 90 t (89 long tons; 99 short tons)
- Power output: 20 × 45 kW (60.35 hp)
- Track gauge: 1,450 mm (4 ft 9 3/32 in)

The CarGoTram was a freight tram in Dresden, Germany that operated between 2001 and 2020. It supplied Volkswagen's "Transparent Factory" with parts for car assembly.

== History ==
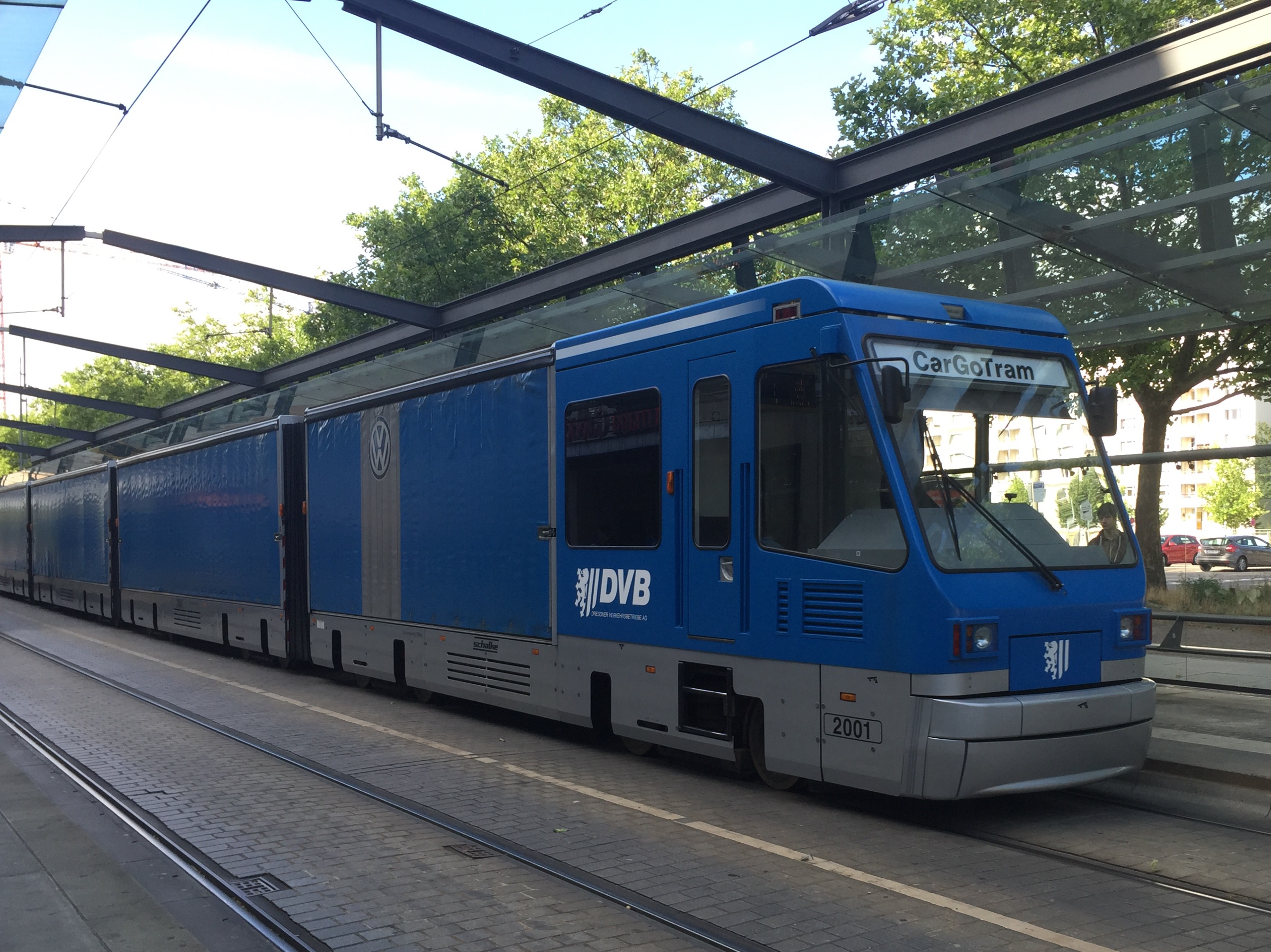
CarGoTram ran by Volkswagen in Dresden. Trams operated by the service were used to carry freight, as opposed to passengers.

The idea of building a "transparent factory" for Volkswagen automobile production in Dresden arose in 1997. In March 2000, Dresdner Verkehrsbetriebe AG (DVB AG, Dresden Public Transport Co.) and Volkswagen Automobil-Manufaktur Dresden GmbH signed a contract for the CarGoTram. Car parts were to be transported from the logistics centre in Friedrichstadt, Dresden to the new factory, using infrastructure normally used for passenger trams. Since the 4 km (2.5 mi) long route from the logistics centre to the factory ran through Dresden's inner city of Dresden, the tram caused less traffic congestion than trucks.

Two CarGoTrams were built by Schalker Eisenhütte Maschinenfabrik GmbH Gelsenkirchen, at a cost of 6.5 million Deutsche Mark (3.3 million euro) each, using the running gear from out-of-service Tatra trams (mostly Tatra T4) combined with newly built bodies.

The tram was officially introduced in Dresden on 16 November 2000 and had its first test run on 3 January 2001.

In March 2016, production of the VW Phaeton in Dresden ended, and with it the service was suspended. It restarted for production of the VW e-Golf in March 2017.

Volkswagen announced in October 2020 that the CarGoTram would stay in service only until late December 2020, when production of the VW e-Golf would end and a new logistics concept would start for VW ID.3 production. The last service was planned for 23 December 2020.

On 10 December 2020, a van crashed into one of the CarGoTrams as it was turning right to the entrance to the Gläserne Manufaktur ("Transparent Factory" of Volkswagen). According to Falk Lösch, spokesman of DVB AG, the van probably passed a red traffic light. Both vehicles were damaged. As the other CarGoTram was not in service at that time, the accident ended the service.

As of December 2022, both trams were still parked in the tram depot.

== Route ==
CarGoTram ran every hour. If necessary, it could run every 40 minutes. Several different routes were used. The main route went from the logistics center in Friedrichstadt via Postplatz and Grunaer Straße to Straßburger Platz and finally on to the factory. If there was heavy traffic, the tram could also take route via the main station or other routes.

== Technology ==
The CarGoTram is a bidirectional vehicle consisting of 5 segments in a standard formation of three all-freight units and two combination freight-and-control units, each with two driven bogies. The control cars have less capacity (7,500 kg or 16,500 lb) than the middle cars (15,000 kg or 33,000 lb) because of space devoted to the driver’s cab. Total capacity is the equivalent of three trucks (214 m^{3} or 7,600 cu ft).

The CarGoTram consists of five segments.

== See also ==
- Freight tram, trams for freight in general
- Specialized trams
- Trams in Dresden
