= Freight tram =

Tram used to transport goods

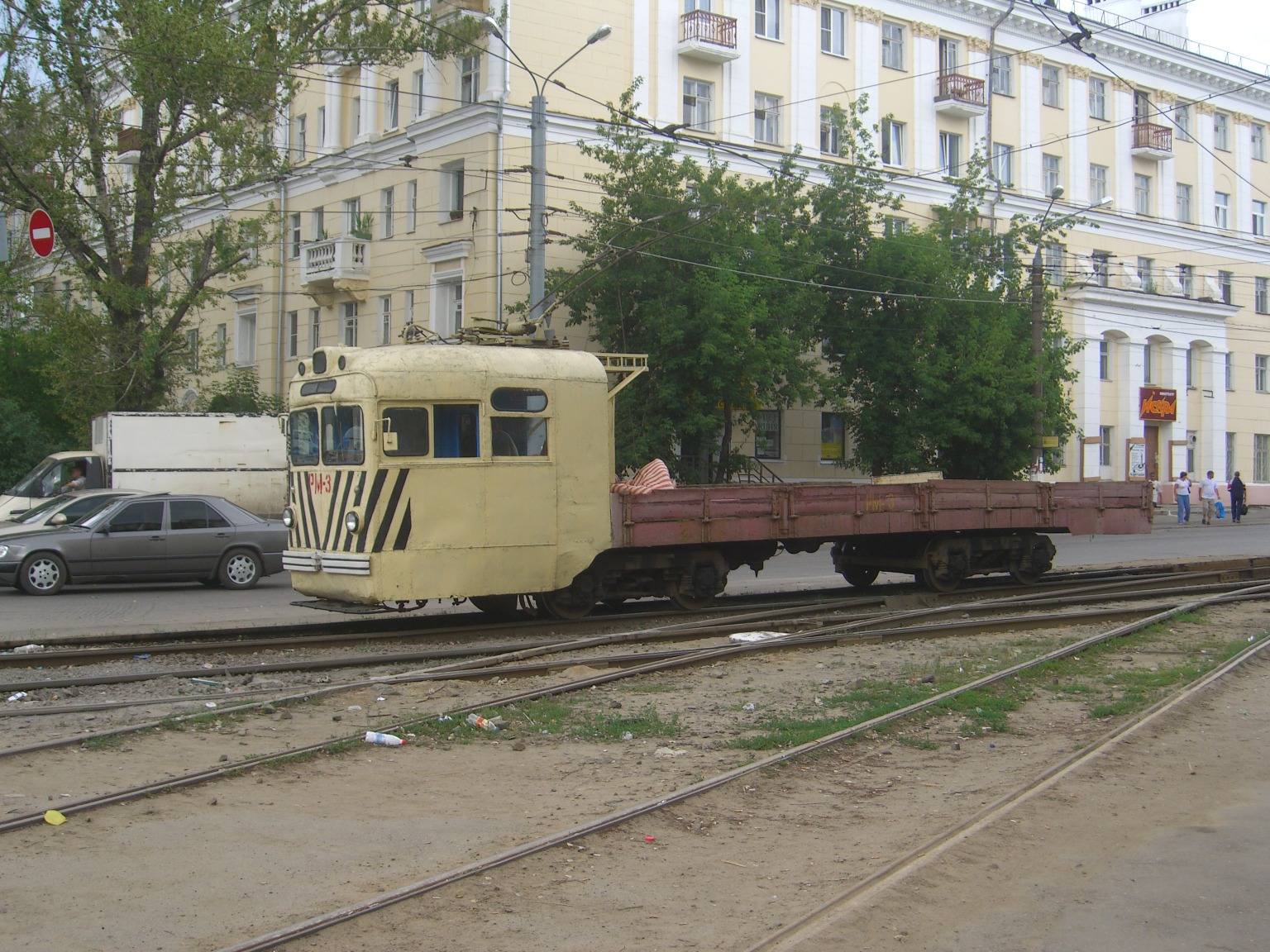
Freight tram based on passenger MTV-82, Nizhny Novgorod

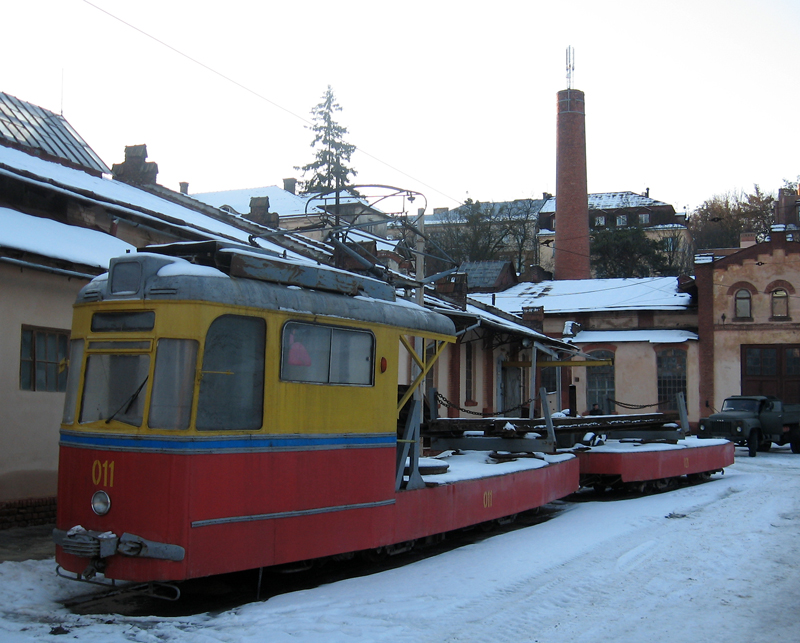
Freight tram in Lviv

A freight tram is a type of service tramcar used to transport goods within a city — one of the possible applications of tram transport. A freight tram is an urban transport solution providing cargo delivery services to local customers. The service tramcars used in most tram networks to carry materials for network maintenance are not part of a dedicated freight-tram organization and are often modified passenger cars, especially old or withdrawn ones. Such cars often become the last operational representatives of their type. In addition to snow-clearing and watering cars, tram systems also use rail-grinding cars, rail carriers, overhead-wire work cars, special cars for thermite welding, track-maintenance cars, tamping machines, and other service trams.

== History ==
With the growth of industry and trade in the 19th century, urban freight traffic increased. Traditional horse-drawn transport could no longer handle the growing cargo volumes. When urban horse railways (horsecars) appeared, they began to be used not only for passengers but also for transporting goods. The freight horsecar became the direct predecessor of the electric freight tram.

Often, goods were delivered to warehouses and shops directly from railway stations via tracks laid through city streets, using full-size railway wagons without reloading. Both horses and small steam locomotives were used for this purpose.

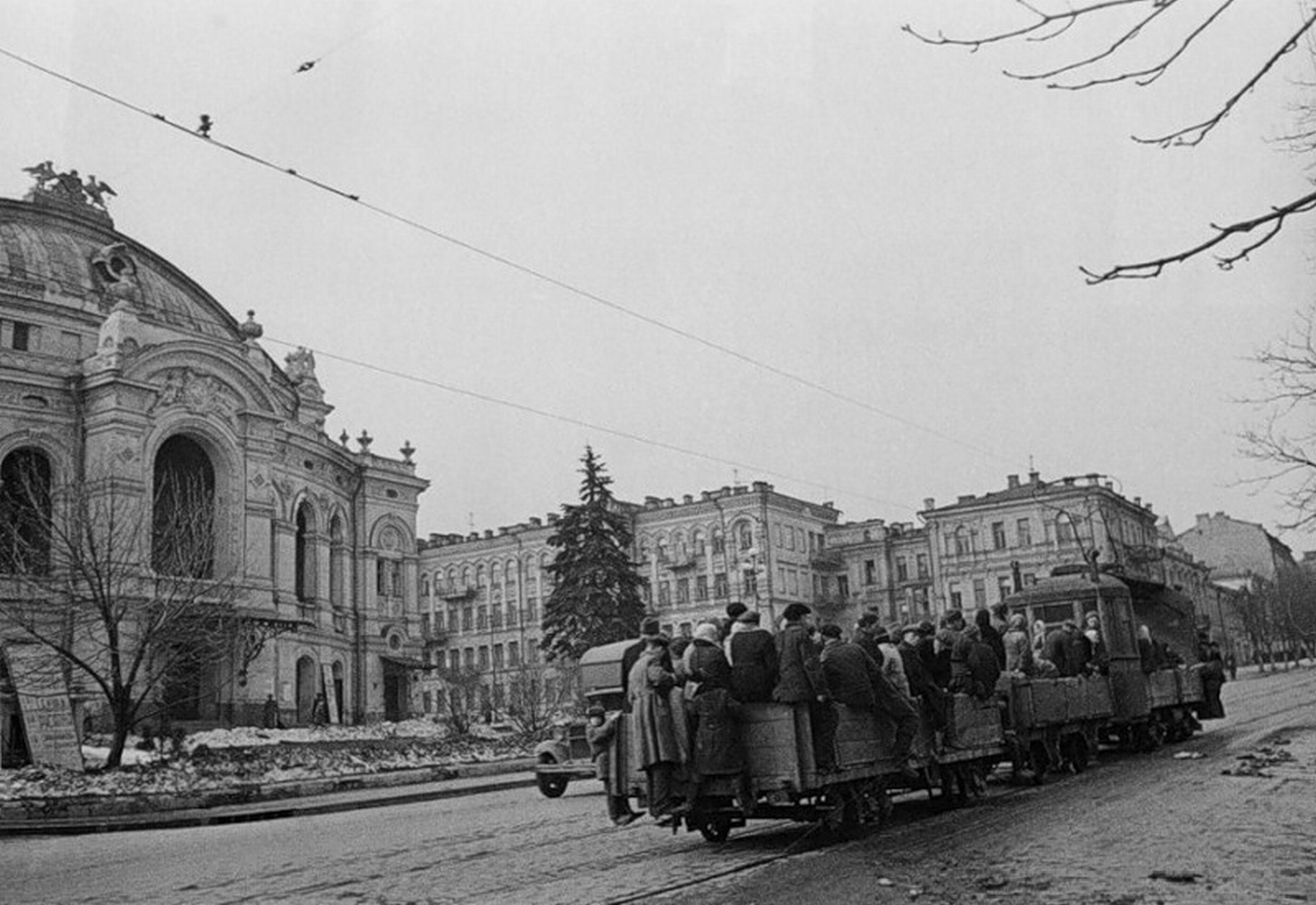
People transported by a freight tram. Kyiv, 1920s

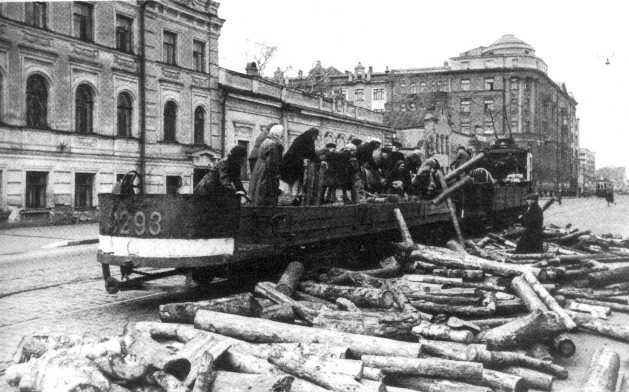
During the Second World War, Moscow

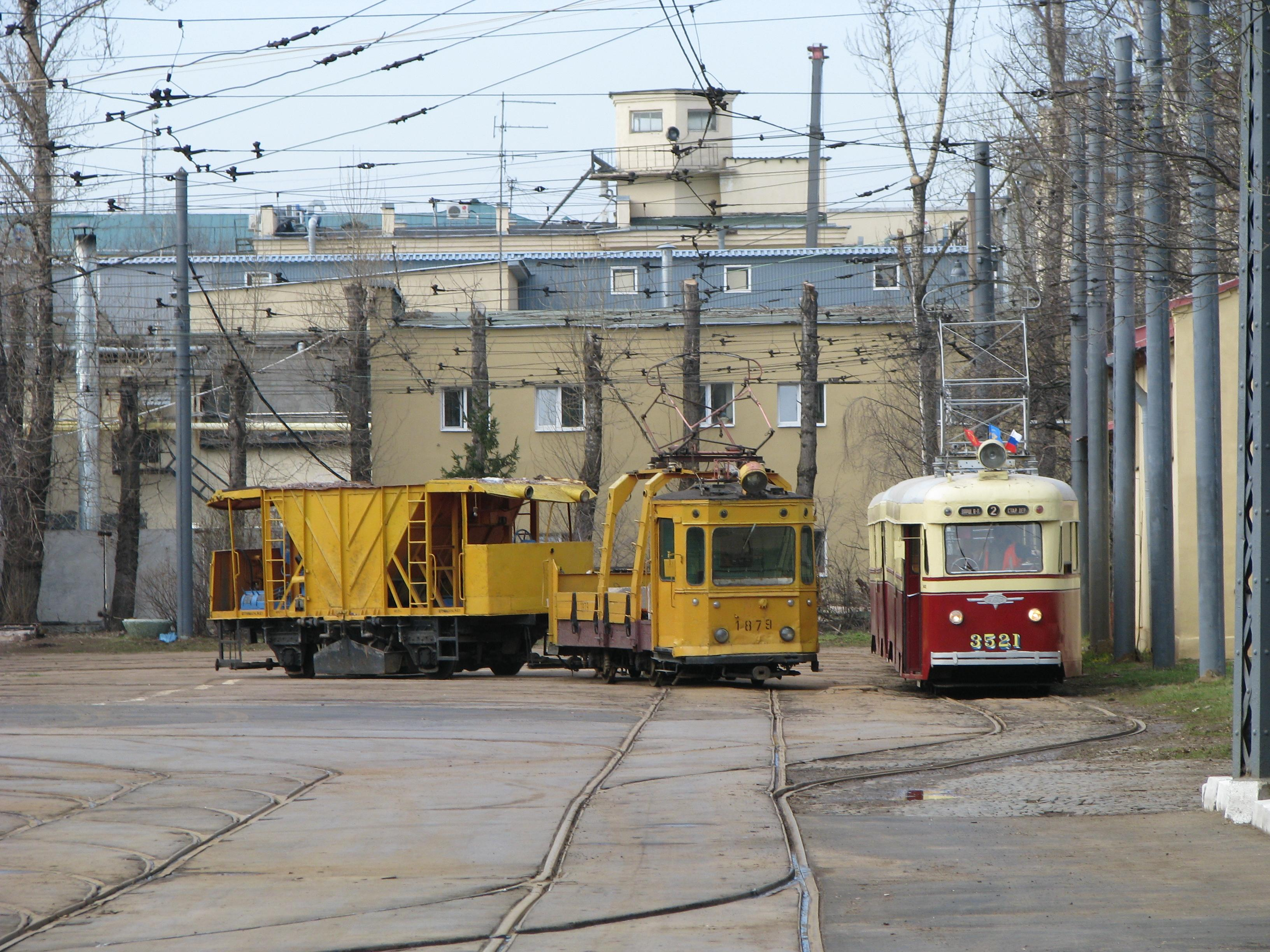
Train with dosing wagons — a feature of the freight tram in Leningrad

With the introduction of electric trams, the new traction system was also applied to freight. Dense tram networks across major European and North American cities connected the goods sheds of railway stations and river wharfs with warehouses and factory sites in other districts. Dedicated freight-tram lines were built for cargo only. For example, the tram system of Kislovodsk (opened 1903, closed 1966) was entirely freight-only throughout its existence, used to transport mineral-water products from the factory to railway warehouses.

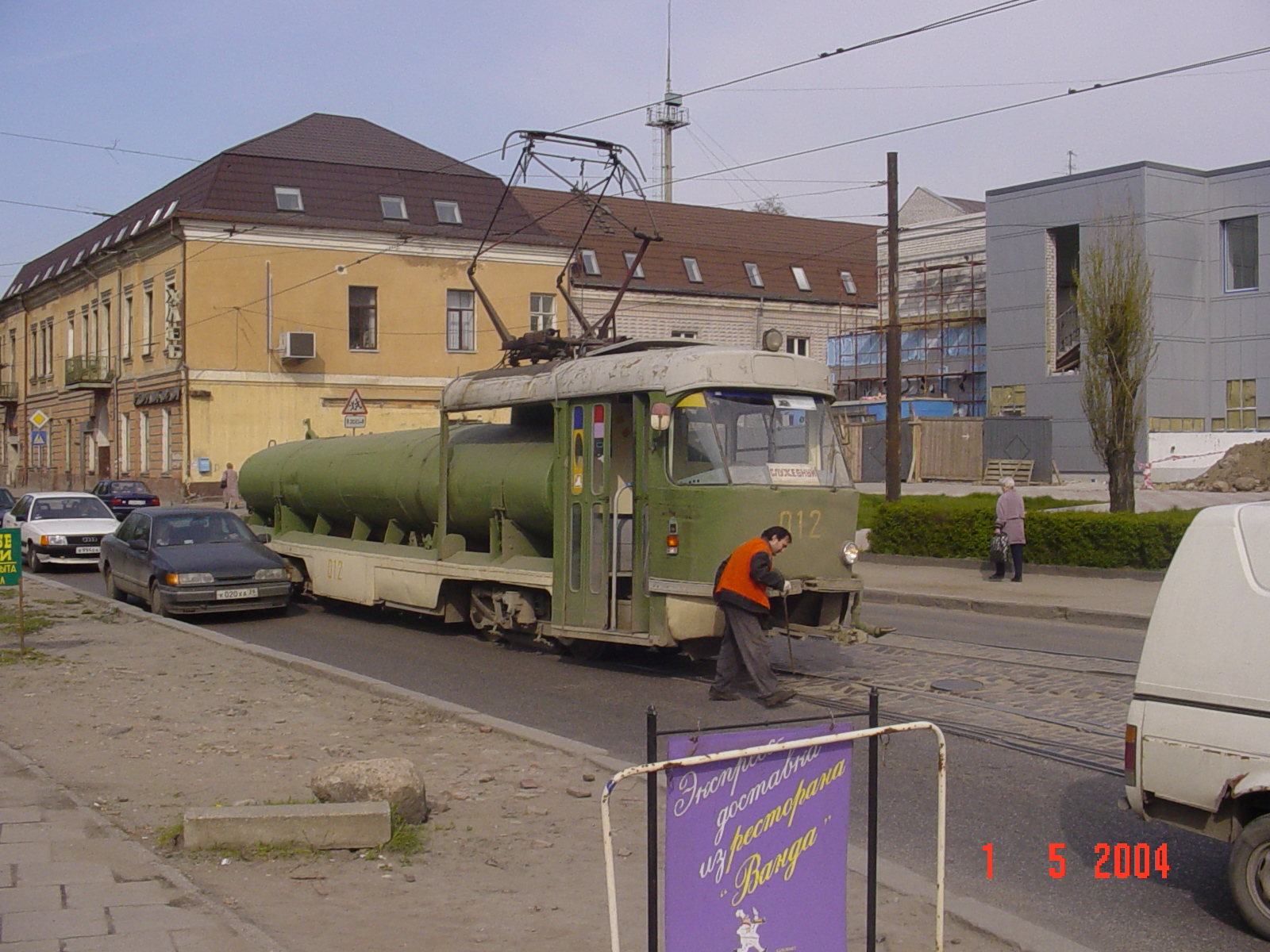
Water-sprinkling tram in Kaliningrad

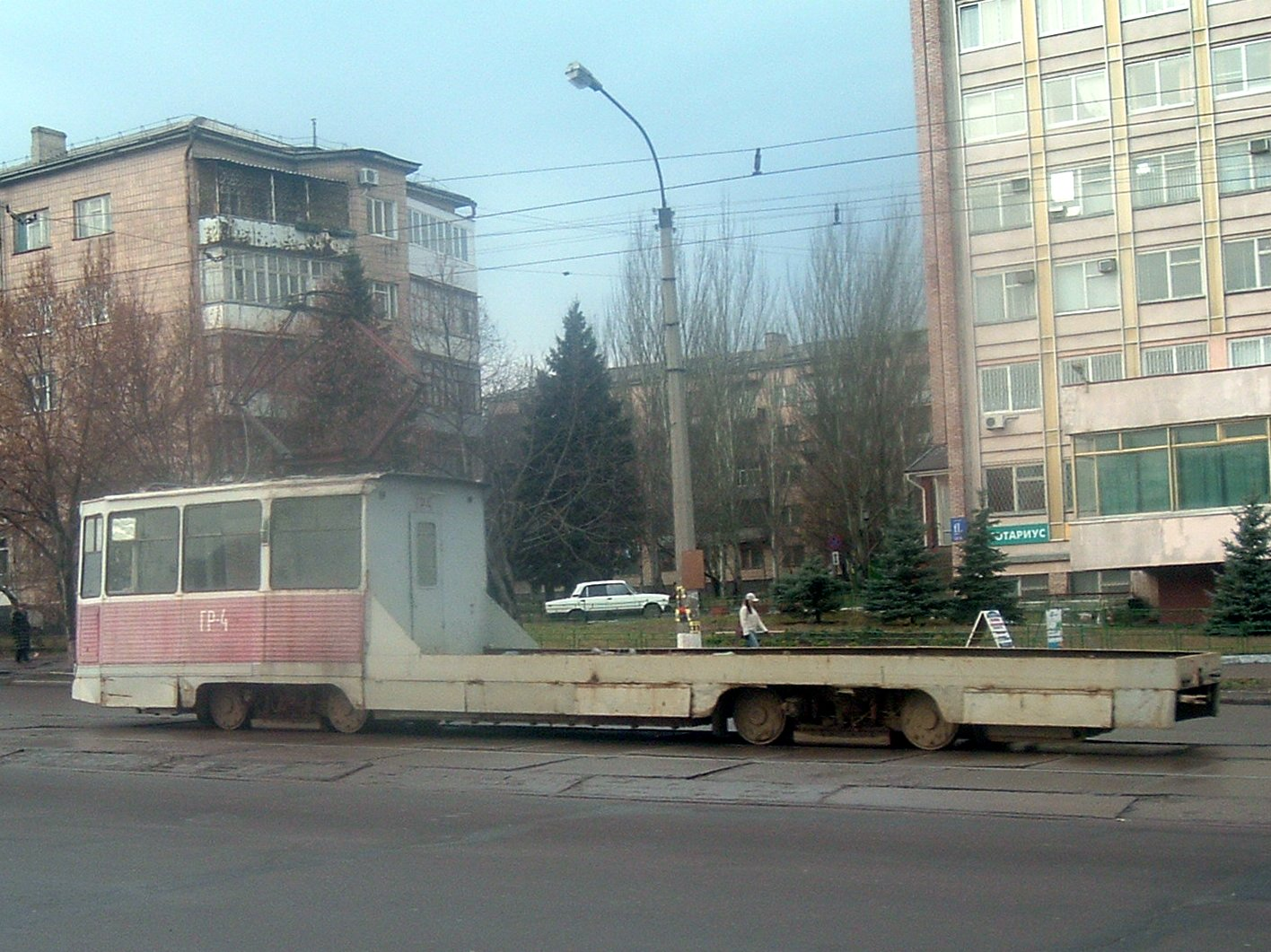
Freight tram based on KTM-5, Luhansk

In Groningen (Netherlands) before the introduction of central heating, there was an entire “coal tram network” where special freight trams delivered coal to heating plants across the city.

The high capacity of electric freight trams and the low operating costs compared to horse transport or early motor lorries made them competitive for urban freight.

Their use grew significantly during the First World War because many horses and trucks were requisitioned for military use. From 1915 to 1921 a large share of goods (coal, firewood, flour, etc.) in Moscow, Petrograd and other major Russian cities was transported by freight trams. In the 1920s–1930s, North American cities even used freight trams as hearses, with special tracks leading to major cemeteries. With the decline of tram transport by the late 1930s, freight trams also lost importance. However, during the Second World War in the USSR, freight trams again became essential — most urban freight in Moscow and Leningrad from 1942 to 1945 was carried by tram.

Freight tram operations in Moscow ceased completely in 1972. In Leningrad, freight tram operations were the most developed in the USSR. After the collapse of the USSR, freight tram use sharply declined; the last users were several state-owned enterprises, but operations ended in 1997. In Kharkiv, a section of tram line was used until recently to deliver freight railway wagons to a confectionery factory.

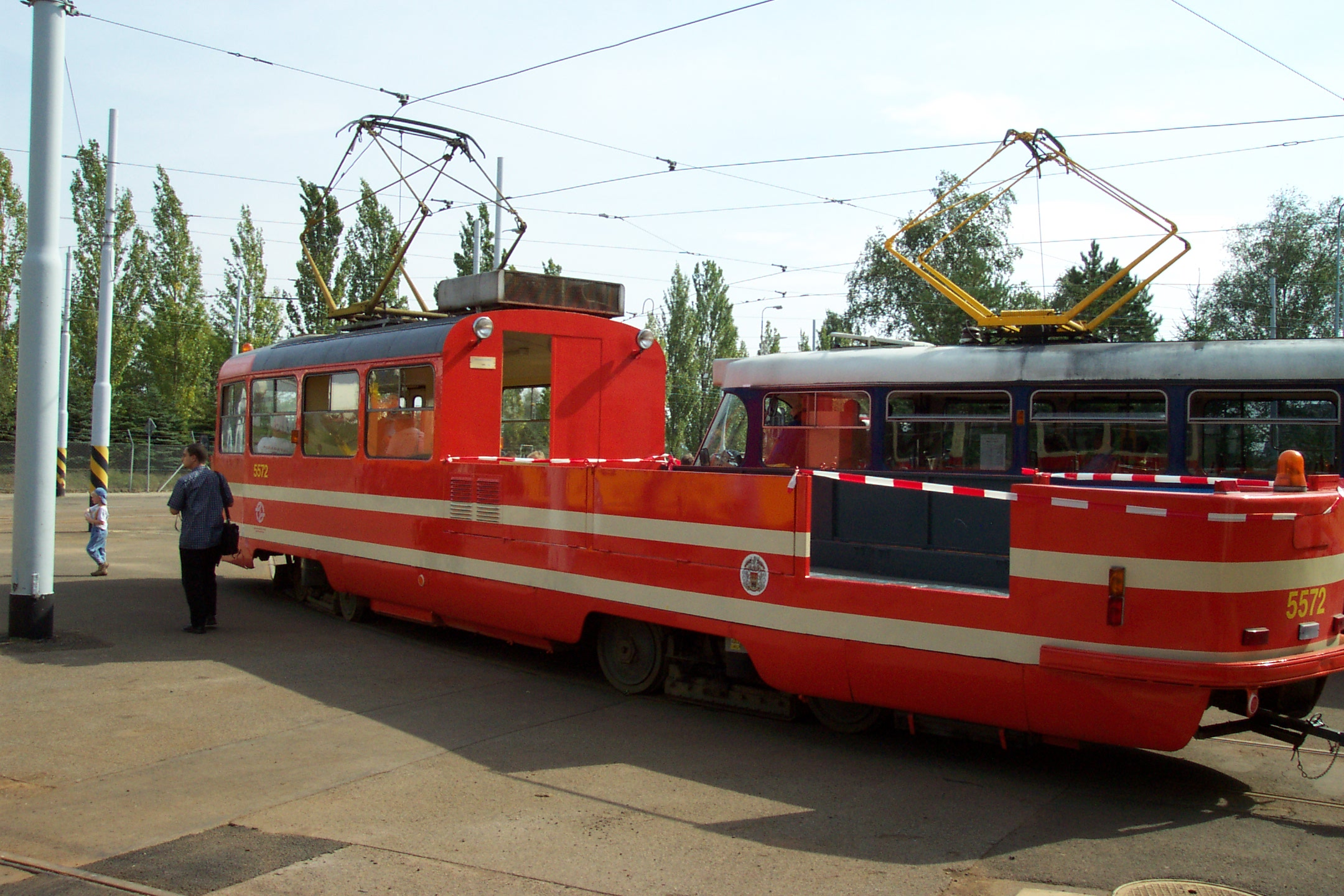
Freight tram based on Tatra T3, Prague

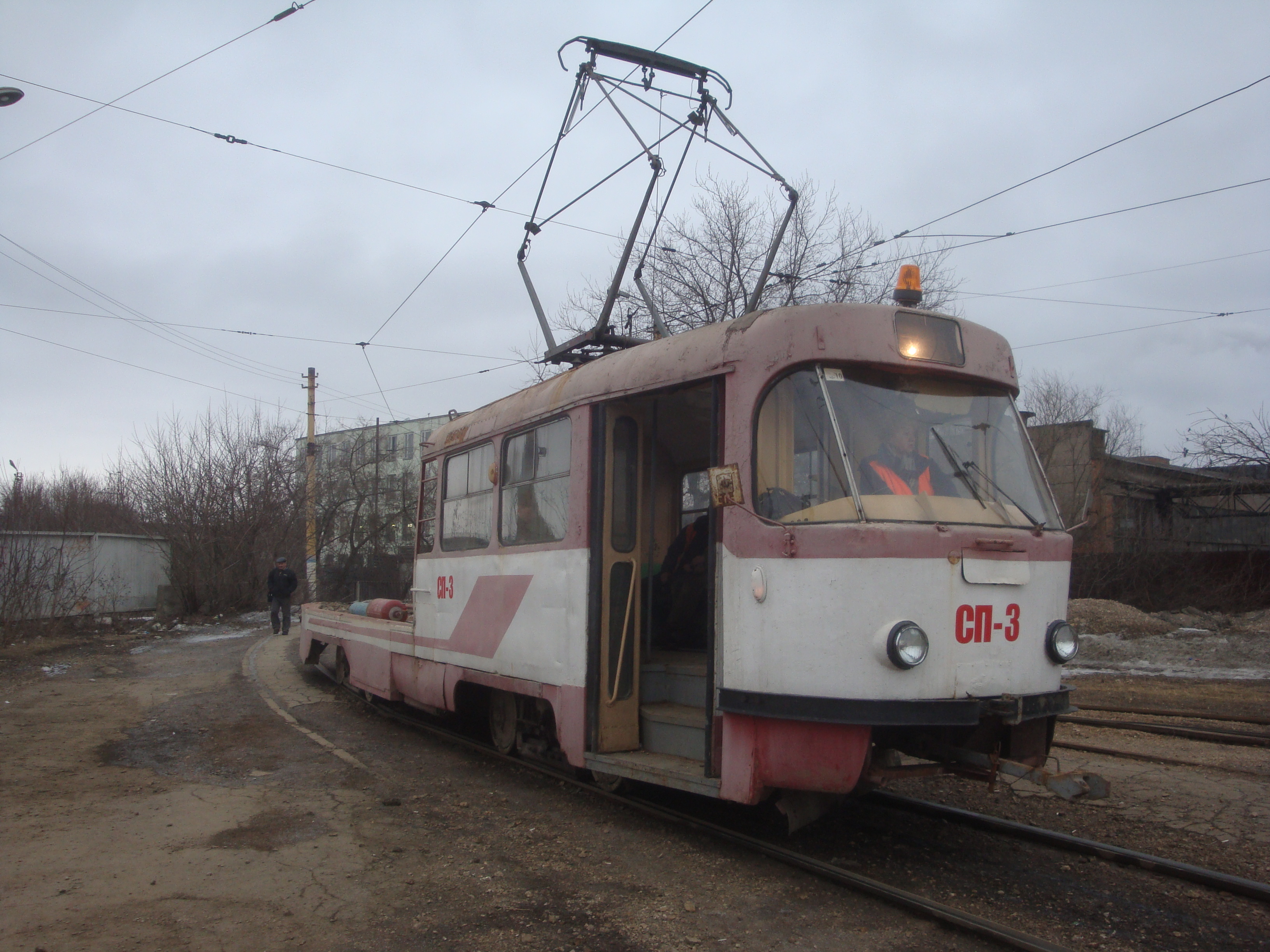
Freight tram based on Tatra T3, Tula

== Modern times ==
Structurally, a freight tram is similar to a regular urban tram, but the passenger saloon is replaced by a cargo platform or enclosed van-type compartment. In modern megacities such trams can be practical when operated on dedicated lines or parallel to light-rail corridors, helping reduce road congestion.

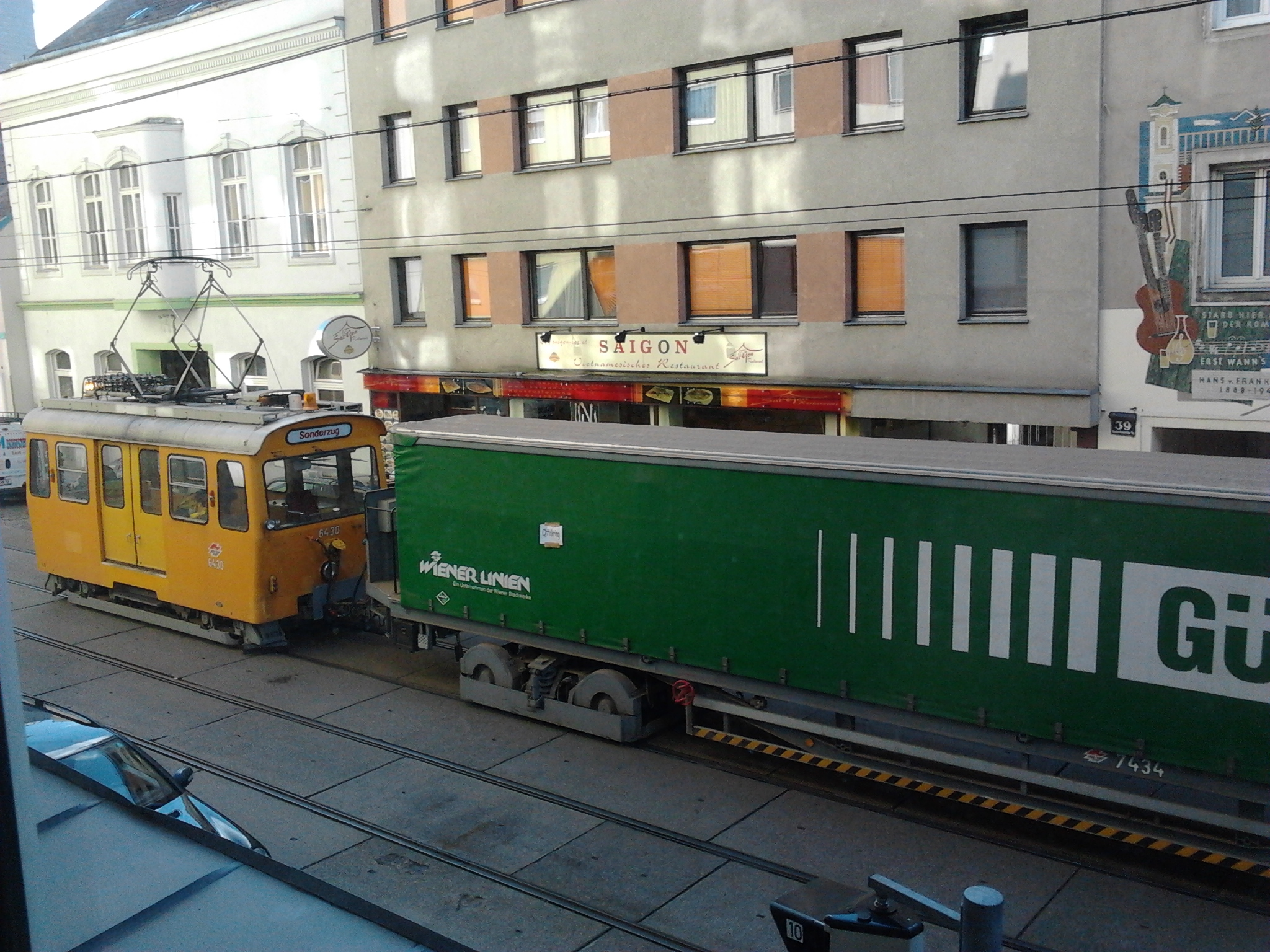
Container transport by freight tram, Vienna

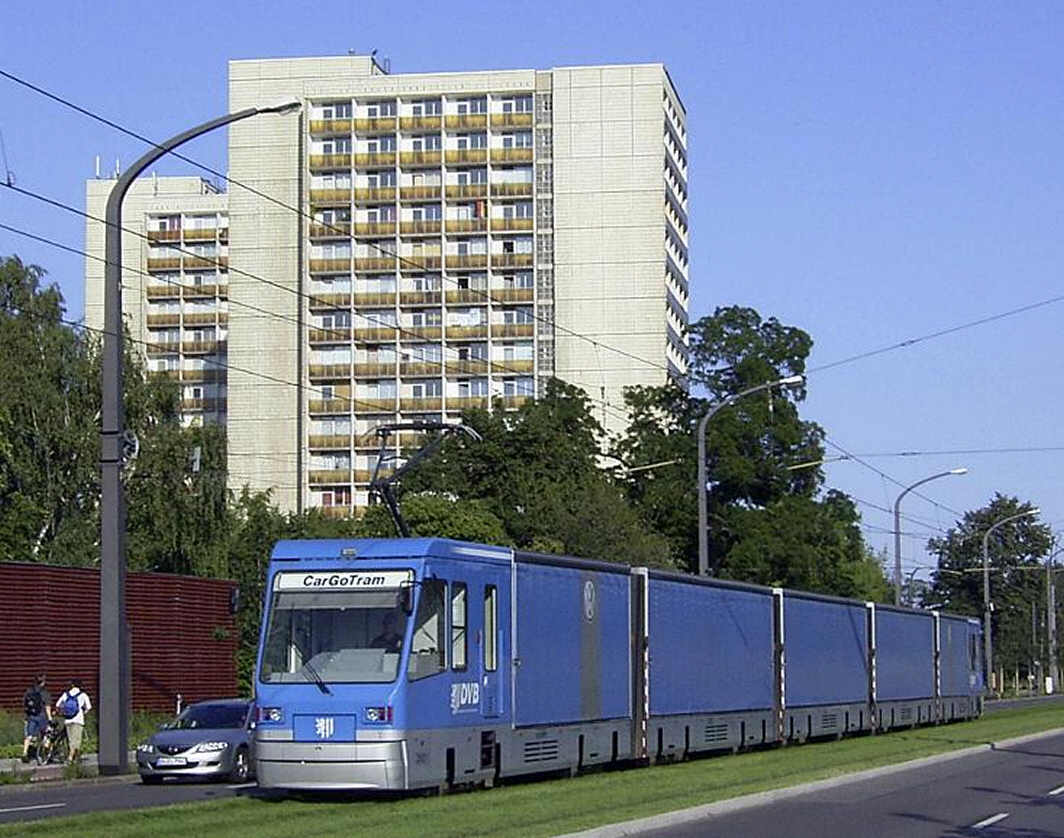
Modern freight tram in Dresden

=== Vienna ===
In May 2005, after a 50-year break, freight trams returned to Vienna. The project, named GüterBim, was launched by Wiener Linien together with partners TINA Vienna, VIENNA CONSULT and Wiener Lokalbahnen AG. It was approved by the Austrian Federal Ministry for Transport (BMVIT) under the I2 (“Intelligent Infrastructure”) program.

Work began in August 2004, including infrastructure assessment and legal/logistical analysis for pilot routes. A trial freight-tram train operated in May 2005; internal routes began in August 2005. On 1 January 2006, the GüterBim-Telematik project started, integrating order processing, logistics, and system monitoring. Results were reported to the Ministry.

=== Dresden ===
Since the 1980s Western Europe has seen renewed interest in clean and efficient freight trams. For example, freight-tram consists operate in Wolfsburg (since 1998) and Dresden (2001-2020) delivering components from supplier warehouses to Volkswagen assembly plants. A consist includes two motor cars with cabs at both ends and three intermediate freight motor cars. Each axle is powered by a 45-kW asynchronous motor; total power is 900 kW. Empty weight is 90 tonnes; maximum loaded weight is 150 tonnes. Total length is nearly 60 metres.

=== Zurich ===
Since 15 April 2003, Zürich (Switzerland) has used trams for waste collection. The garbage-tram train consists of a motor tram and two platform trailers with containers. Residents are informed in advance where and when to bring their waste. The tram collects bulky waste such as old bicycles and furniture.

On its first day, it collected 7.7 tonnes of waste. Until December 2003 it worked experimentally; due to success (cheaper than trucks), the service continued. Initially containers were transferred at the depot onto trucks; in 2005 a dedicated tram branch line to the waste-processing plant was opened, removing the need for transfer.

In December 2006 a second waste tram began operation — the E-Tram, used to collect electronic and electrical waste.

== In film ==
- The Property of the Republic (1971) — children escape from an orphanage on a freight tram.
- Unbelievable Adventures of Italians in Russia (1973) — characters flee from a lion on a freight tram.
- Strange Men of Ekaterina Semyonova (1992) — freight tram appears repeatedly.
- Brother (1997) — Danila Bagrov hides from bandits on a freight tram.

== See also ==
- Trolleytruck

== Sources ==
- B.A. Schenk, M.R. van den Toorn. Trams 2004. Uitgeverij Alk bv. ISBN 90-6013-436-2
- B.A. Schenk, M.R. van den Toorn. Trams 2005. Uitgeverij Alk bv. ISBN 90-6013-446-X
- B.A. Schenk, M.R. van den Toorn. Trams 2006. Uitgeverij Alk bv. ISBN 90-6013-456-7
