= El Grillo =

El Grillo (Spanish for "the cricket") may refer to:

- El Grillo (song), a song by Josquin des Prez published in 1505
- SS El Grillo, a British oil tanker sunk during World War II
- Nickname of football coach Jorge Roldán (born 1940)

== See also ==
- Grillo (disambiguation)
