= Trolleytruck =

Electric truck taking power from overhead wires

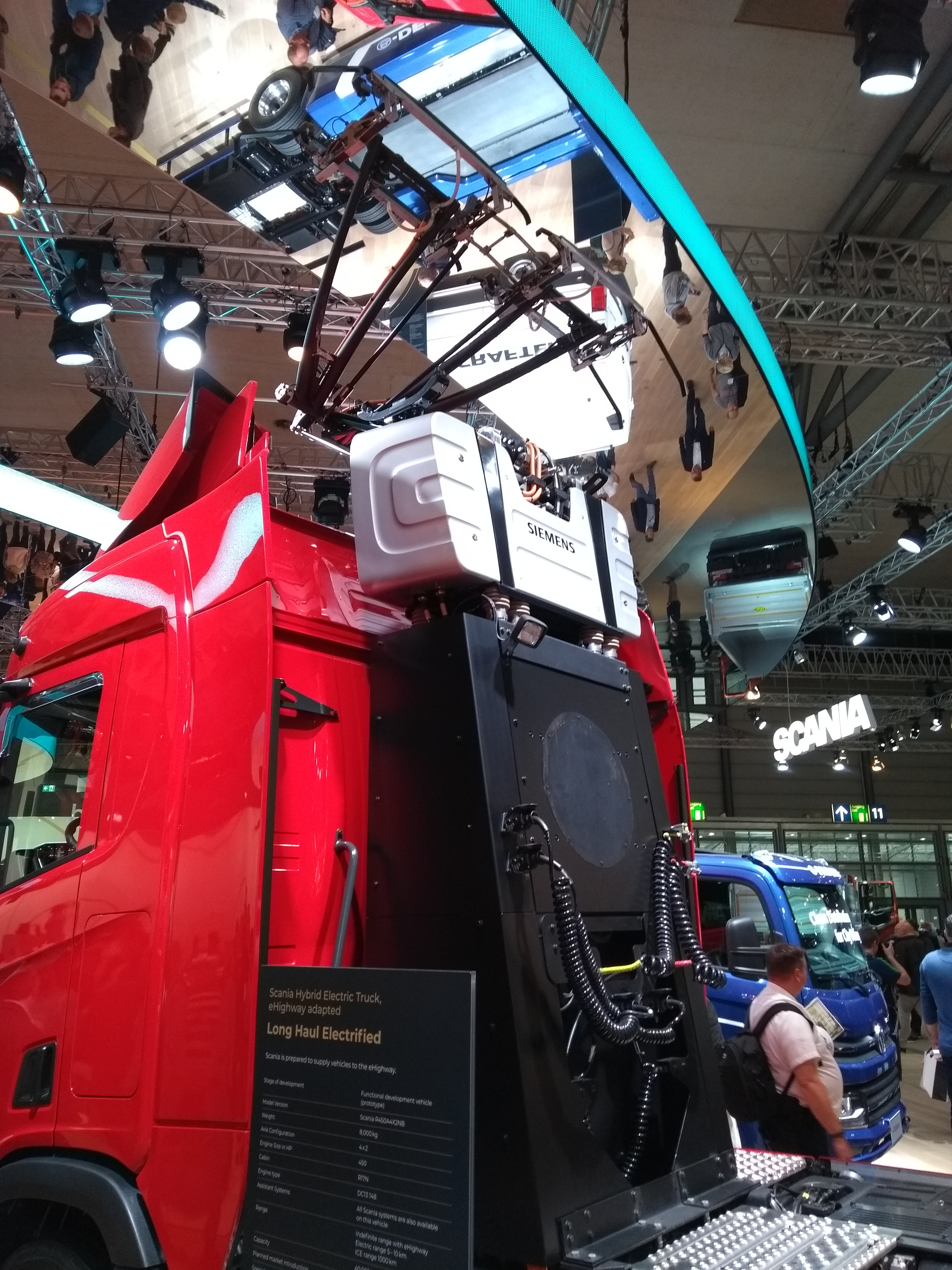
A modern Scania R-series hybrid trolleytruck on display in Germany. Note the double pantograph on the back of the driver's cabin

A trolleytruck (also known as a freight trolley or trolley truck) is a trolleybus-like vehicle used for carrying cargo instead of passengers. A trolleytruck is usually a type of electric truck powered by two overhead wires, from which it draws electricity using two trolley poles. In some languages, special terms exist, such as trolleyvoz (троллейвоз) in Russian or Oberleitungslastkraftwagen in German.

Two current collectors are required in order to supply and return current, because the return current cannot pass to the ground (as is done by streetcars on rails) since trolleytrucks use tires that are insulators. Lower-powered trucks tend to use trolley poles for current collection, while higher-powered trucks, such as those in large-scale construction or mining, may exceed the capacity of trolley poles and use pantographs instead.

Historically, trolleytrucks have seen use worldwide, particularly in the former Soviet Union. Today, they are still used for service roles in some cities in Russia and Ukraine, and as heavy-duty haulers in mines in North America and Africa. Because they draw power from the grid, trolleytrucks can use renewable energy. This has led to a modern revival of the concept in the form of "eHighways", where diesel–electric hybrid trucks use overhead lines on motorways to reduce emissions, with test projects underway in Sweden, Germany, and the United States.

== History ==
=== Early developments ===
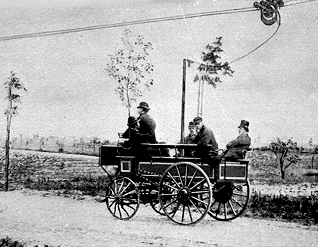
The Elektromote, demonstrated by Siemens in 1882 near Berlin, was the ancestor of all trolley-powered vehicles.

The concept of drawing power from overhead lines for a vehicle dates back to April 29, 1882, when Dr. Ernst Werner von Siemens demonstrated his Elektromote in Halensee, a suburb of Berlin, Germany. This experiment is considered the first demonstration of a trolley-powered vehicle in the world.

The first application of the technology for freight transport began on July 10, 1901 in Königstein, Germany. Engineer Max Schiemann launched a 2.8 km line for a paper mill, utilizing electric tractors to pull trailers. His system, with its swiveling, spring-loaded trolley poles, became a standard for early trolley vehicle systems.

Several other freight trolley systems were established in Germany in the early 20th century:

- The Kalkbahn Grevenbrück (1903–1907) was used exclusively to transport limestone from a quarry to the Grevenbrück railway station.
- The Gleislose Bahn Monheim-Langenfeld (1904–1908) in Rhineland carried both passengers and freight. However, the heavy trucks quickly damaged the road surface, and the line was replaced by a railway.
- The Mühlenbahn Großbauchlitz (1905–1914) served mills in what is now Döbeln.
- The Hafenschleppbahn Altona (1911–1949) in Altona (now part of Hamburg) used electric tractors to tow wagons from the Elbe river port up a steep incline to the Altona railway station, replacing horse-drawn transport.
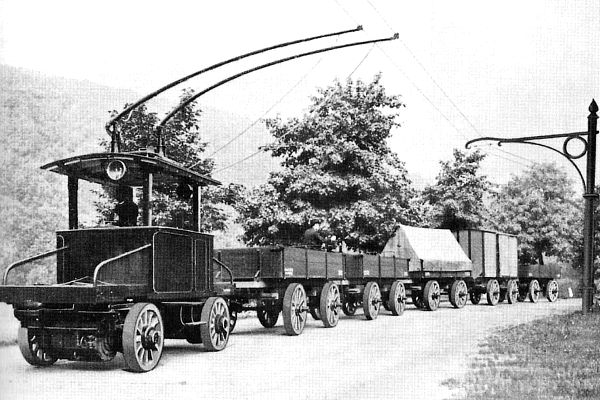
A freight "trolley-train" of the Monheim-Langenfeld trackless railway (1904–1908).

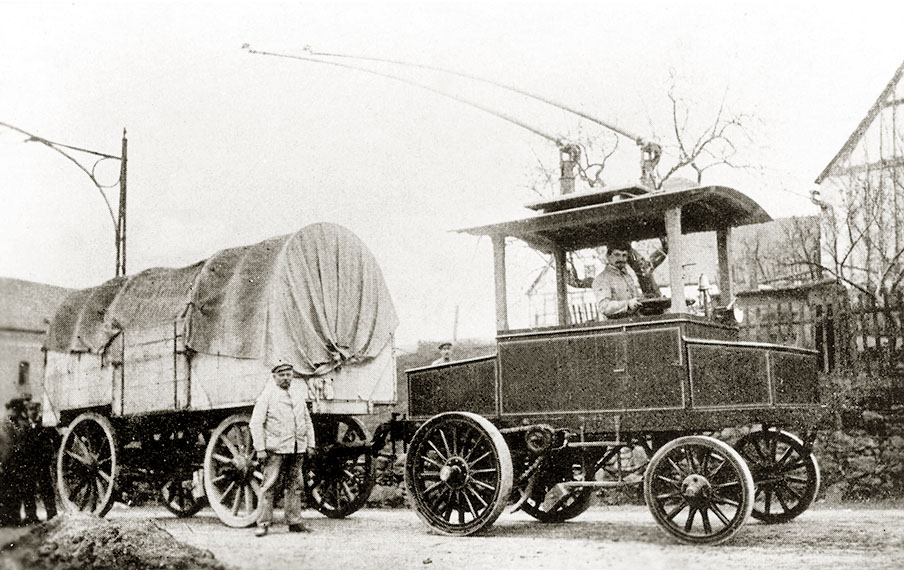
A freight trolleytruck that served the mills in Großbauchlitz (1905–1914).

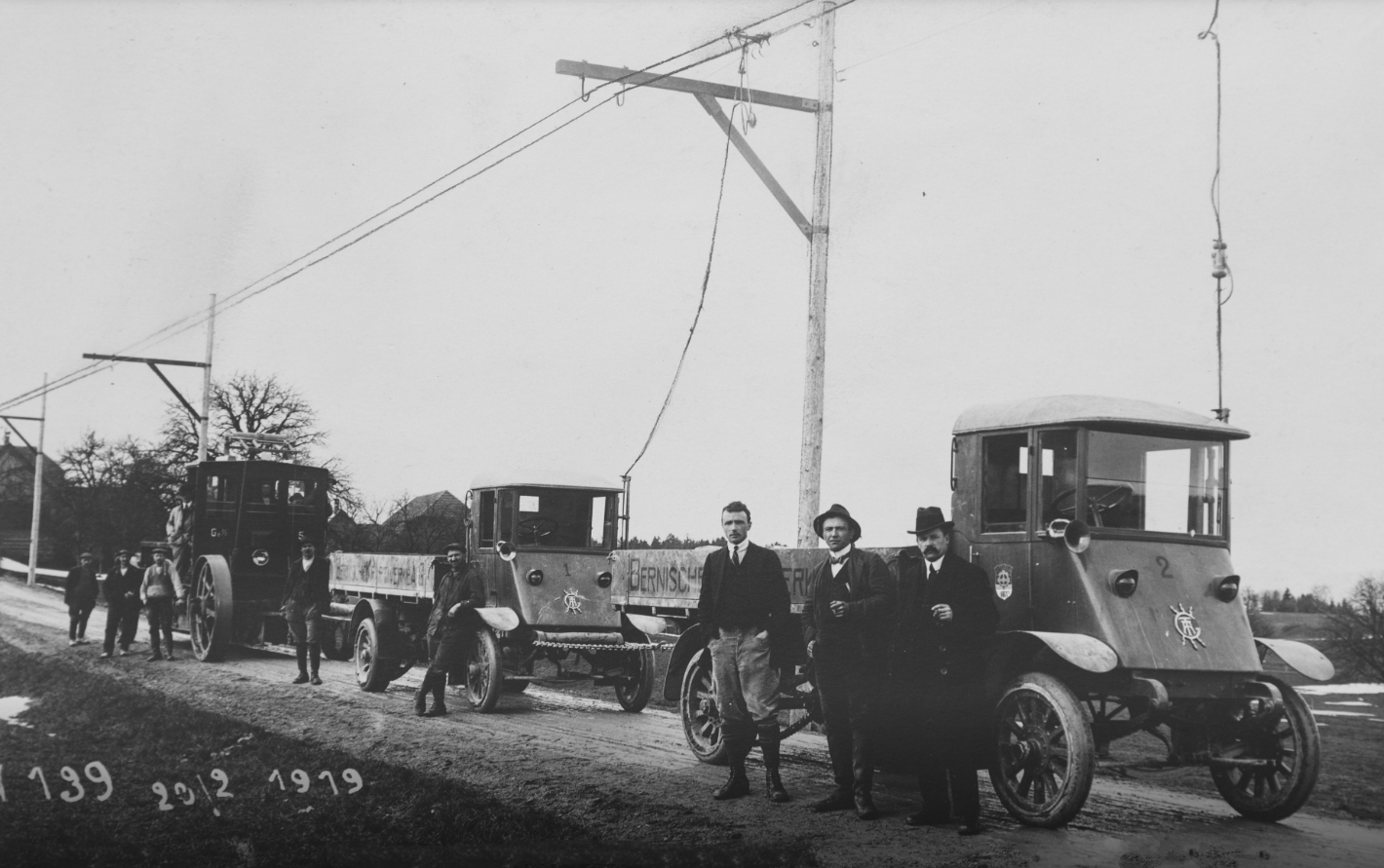
Electric trucks and a tractor used for dam construction in Switzerland (1918-1922).

=== Interwar period and World War II ===
In the 1930s, the Soviet Union began developing trolleytrucks. In Moscow, under the initiative of I. S. Efremov, director of the Second Trolleybus Park, the first serial trolleytrucks were created. They were equipped with extra-long trolley poles, allowing them to maneuver up to 6–7 meters from the overhead lines. The Yaroslavl Motor Plant began producing dedicated freight models, starting with the YaTB-4 in 1939, followed by the 8-tonne YaTB-5 in 1941. During World War II and the Battle of Moscow, a shortage of gasoline and the mobilization of conventional trucks for military use led to the expansion of trolleytruck operations. Old passenger trolleybuses were converted to freight use, and a dedicated freight trolley line was built along the Leningradskoye Highway to supply the city's Northern River Port.

In Italy, a major trolleytruck system was built in 1938 to support the construction of dams in the Valtellina valley. Twenty trolleytrucks were used to transport cement and other materials for the construction of the San Giacomo and Cancano II dams. The system operated for over 25 years, until 1962.

=== Post-war era and Soviet dominance ===
After World War II, the most significant developments occurred in the Soviet Union. To increase flexibility, a new type of vehicle was created: the diesel-trolleytruck, or duobus, which combined an electric motor for use under overhead wires with a conventional internal combustion engine for off-wire travel. This allowed vehicles to serve areas without full catenary coverage.

Experiments were conducted to convert standard heavy-duty trucks into trolleytrucks:

- In 1952, a dump truck based on the MAZ-525 was converted to electric power. It was equipped with two trolleybus motors with a total power of 170 kW. While it offered significant fuel savings, the constant need to relocate overhead wires in quarries and construction sites proved impractical.
- In 1961, a diesel-trolleytruck designated GTU-10 was developed based on the KrAZ-219 truck. It briefly operated on the famous Simferopol-Yalta intercity line before being converted back to a conventional truck.
- In 1964, BelAZ developed the BelAZ-7524-792, a 65-tonne capacity diesel-trolley hauler. Trials in 1965 showed its effectiveness, but the economic viability of such systems in open-pit mines was found to be dependent on the mine's depth (at least 300 meters) and stable haulage routes.

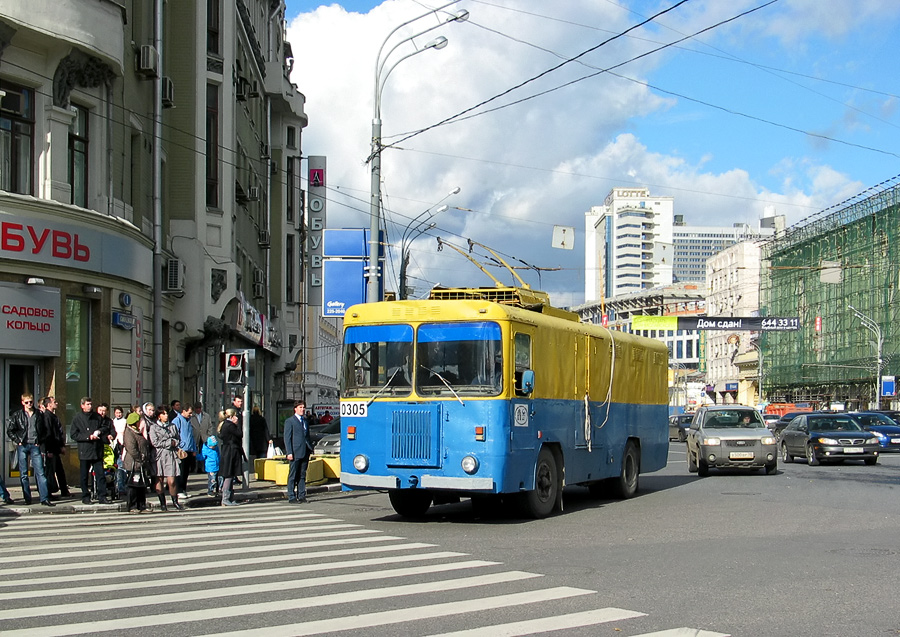
KTG-1 on the Smolenskaya-Sennaya Square, Moscow, Russia

The most mass-produced and widely used trolleytrucks in the USSR were the KTG (Kiyevskiy Trollrybus Gruzovoy – Kyiv Freight Trolleybus) models, produced by the Kyiv Electric Transport Plant (KZET) from the 1970s. These vehicles were not conversions but purpose-built. Models like the KTG-1 (covered van) and KTG-2 (flatbed) became ubiquitous in cities with trolleybus systems, where they were used for maintenance, repair of overhead lines, and transportation of goods for the transit authorities. Many of these vehicles remain in service today in a utility role.

== Applications by country ==
=== Austria ===
Trolleytrucks were used in St. Lambrecht by the Nobel Industries dynamite factory from 1945 to 1951. They transported dynamite over the Alps after World War II due to material shortages that prevented the use of diesel trucks. By the 1950s, the trolleytrucks were replaced with diesel trucks, and some were converted into passenger trolleybuses in Kapfenberg. During the war, battery-powered trolleybuses were also used as tractors to pull freight trailers in Salzburg and Klagenfurt to conserve fuel.

Since 2020, hybrid dump trucks have been used at the Erzberg mine, which can be operated emission-free via overhead lines on certain routes.

=== Bulgaria ===
A Ukrainian-built trolleytruck began service in Pleven in 1987, but it may no longer be in service.

=== Canada ===
The Québec Cartier Mining Company used trolleytrucks in its iron ore mine in Québec from 1970 until 1977. The power was supplied by a 1,800-horsepower (1,340 kW) power plant from a diesel locomotive. As of 2022, the Copper Mountain Mining Corporation at Copper Mountain, British Columbia, is converting its haul trucks to trolley assist for the climb out of the pit, powered by BC Hydro.

=== France ===
France had several early trolleytruck systems, most notably an electric tractor system for towing barges along the Rhine–Marne Canal. The electrified section ran from Sarrebourg to Gondrexange and was about 12 kilometers long. The system was in operation from 1910 to 1965.

=== Germany ===
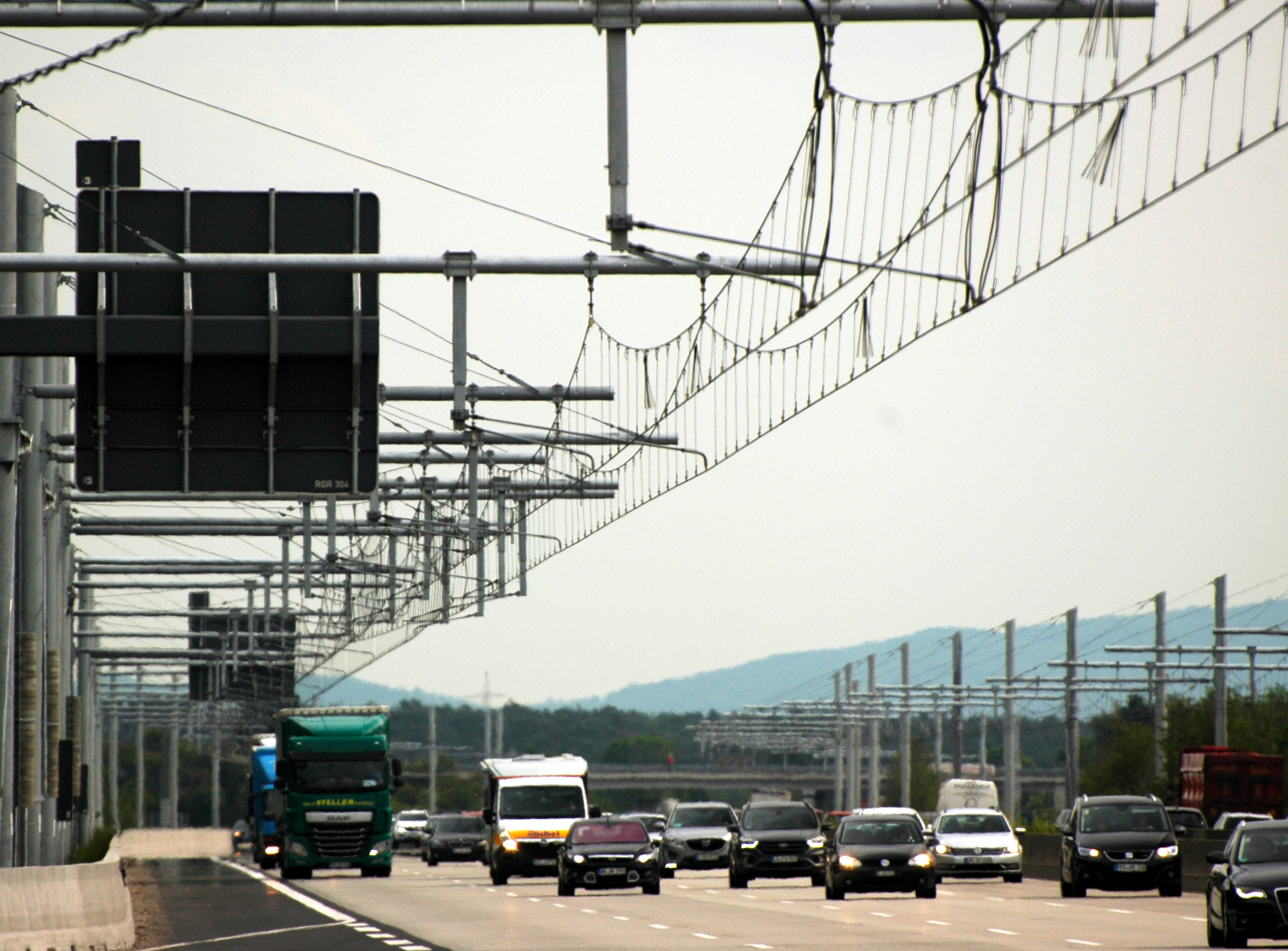
The "eHighway" test track on the A5 Autobahn between Frankfurt and Darmstadt.

In addition to the early 20th-century systems, trolleytrucks were used in the GDR. From 1984 to 1988, converted Soviet BelAZ dump trucks, fitted with electrical equipment from decommissioned Škoda 9Tr trolleybuses, operated in the Bitterfeld brown coal mine. A similar system was installed at the Elbingerode lime works in 1988 but saw only a single test run in November 1989 due to the economic changes following the fall of the Berlin Wall.

In the 21st century, Germany has pioneered the modern "eHighway" concept. The Federal Ministry for the Environment has funded test tracks on the autobahn for diesel-electric hybrids. The first public test track opened on May 7, 2019, on a 5-km stretch of the A5 south of Frankfurt. Other test routes were established in Schleswig-Holstein (A1) and Baden-Württemberg (B 462).

=== Italy ===
In addition to the extensive system used for dam construction in Valtellina (1938–1962), Italy had earlier trolleytruck operations. Starting in 1905, light trolleytrucks based on FRAM-Cantono designs were used on the Pescara–Castellammare Adriatico line. During World War I, several trolleytruck lines were also established to supply the front lines, including routes from Enego to Primolano and Édolo to Ponte di Legno.

=== Namibia ===
The Rössing Uranium Mine installed a trolley assist system around 1986. The diesel-electric Komatsu 730E dump trucks were converted to use trolley power for the climb out of the mine.

=== North Korea ===
While not a standalone freight system, the trolleybus network in Pyongyang is notable for its extensive use of converted trolleybuses for freight transport. Many older, retired passenger vehicles have been repurposed to carry goods, making it one of the largest de facto trolleytruck fleets in the world.

=== South Africa ===
Trolleytrucks were introduced to the Palabora copper mine in 1980. The South African Iron and Steel Industrial Corporation (ISCOR) installed a 7.7 km trolley assist line at its Shishen mine in 1982 and later at its Grootegeluk coal mine. ISCOR (now part of Mittal Steel South Africa) became the world's largest user of trolley-assist systems.

=== Soviet Union, Russia, Ukraine ===
While many trolleytrucks have been retired, some remain in operation in cities across Russia and Ukraine. These are typically the KTG-1 and KTG-2 models, used as service vehicles within the trolleybus depots for tasks like overhead line maintenance, towing disabled trolleybuses, and transporting materials.

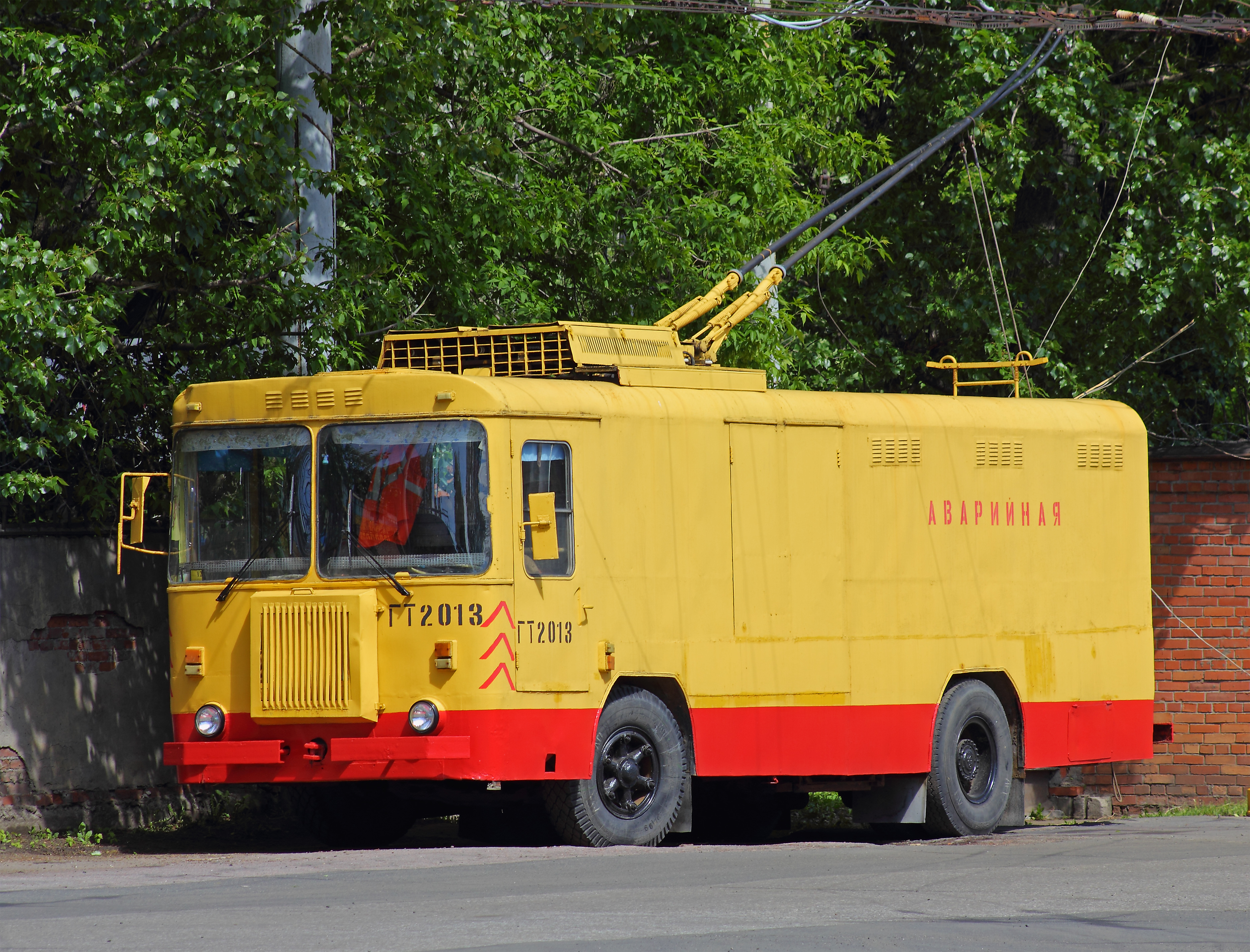
Trolleytruck KTG-1 in Saint Petersburg, Russia, used for depot work.

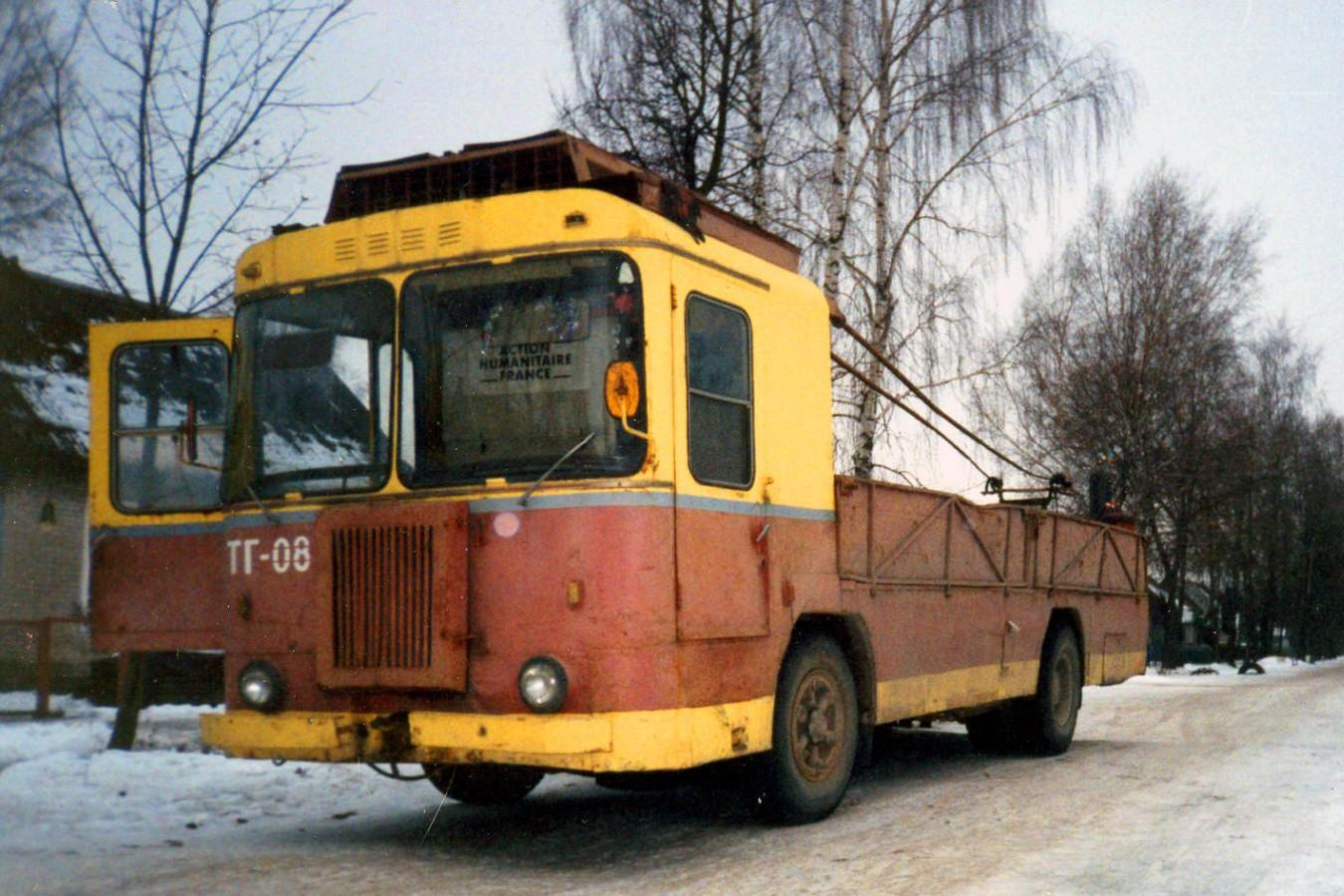
TG-08 in Bryansk, Russia, in 2005.

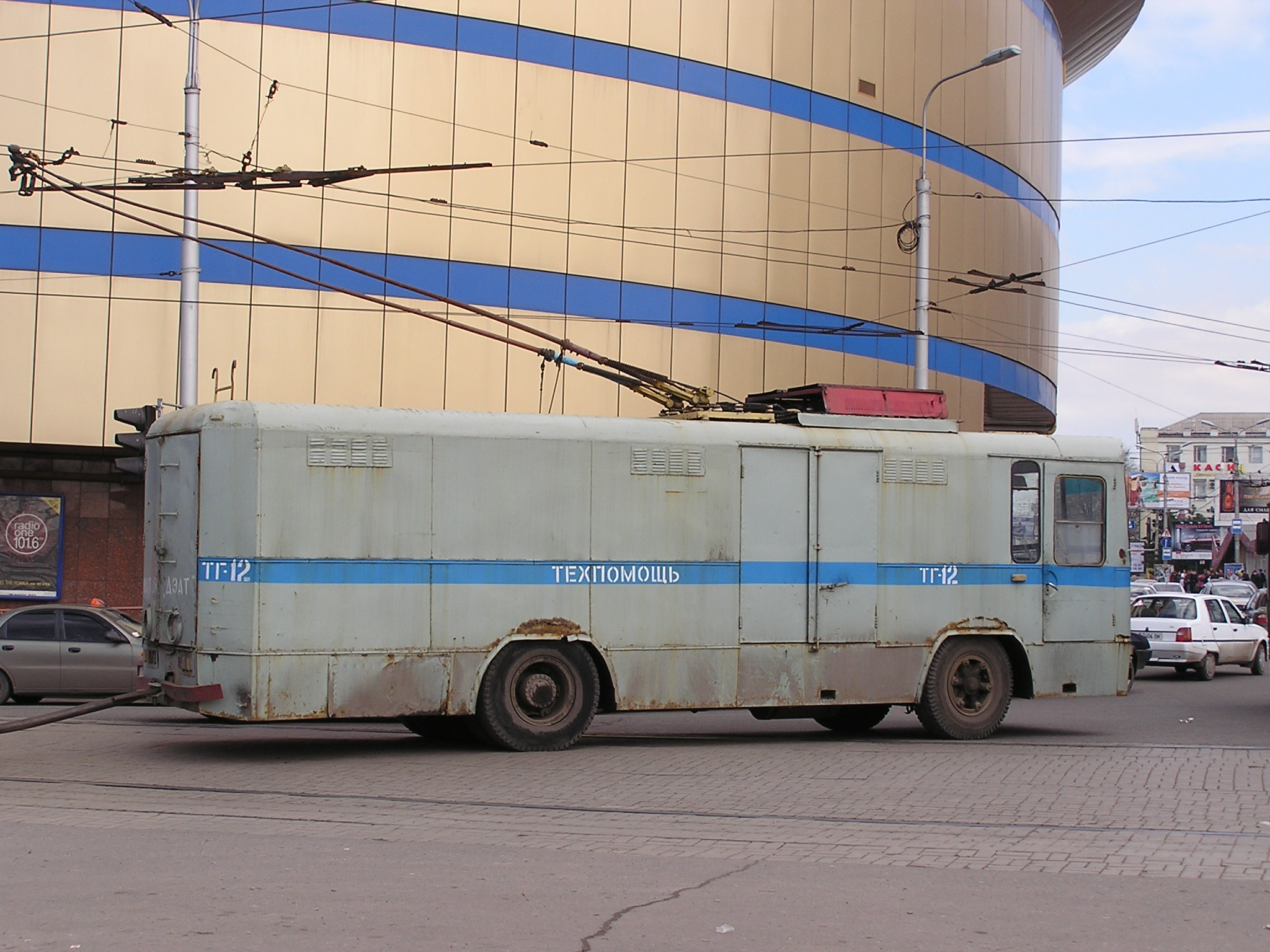
Service wagon TG-12 in Donetsk, Ukraine, in 2008.

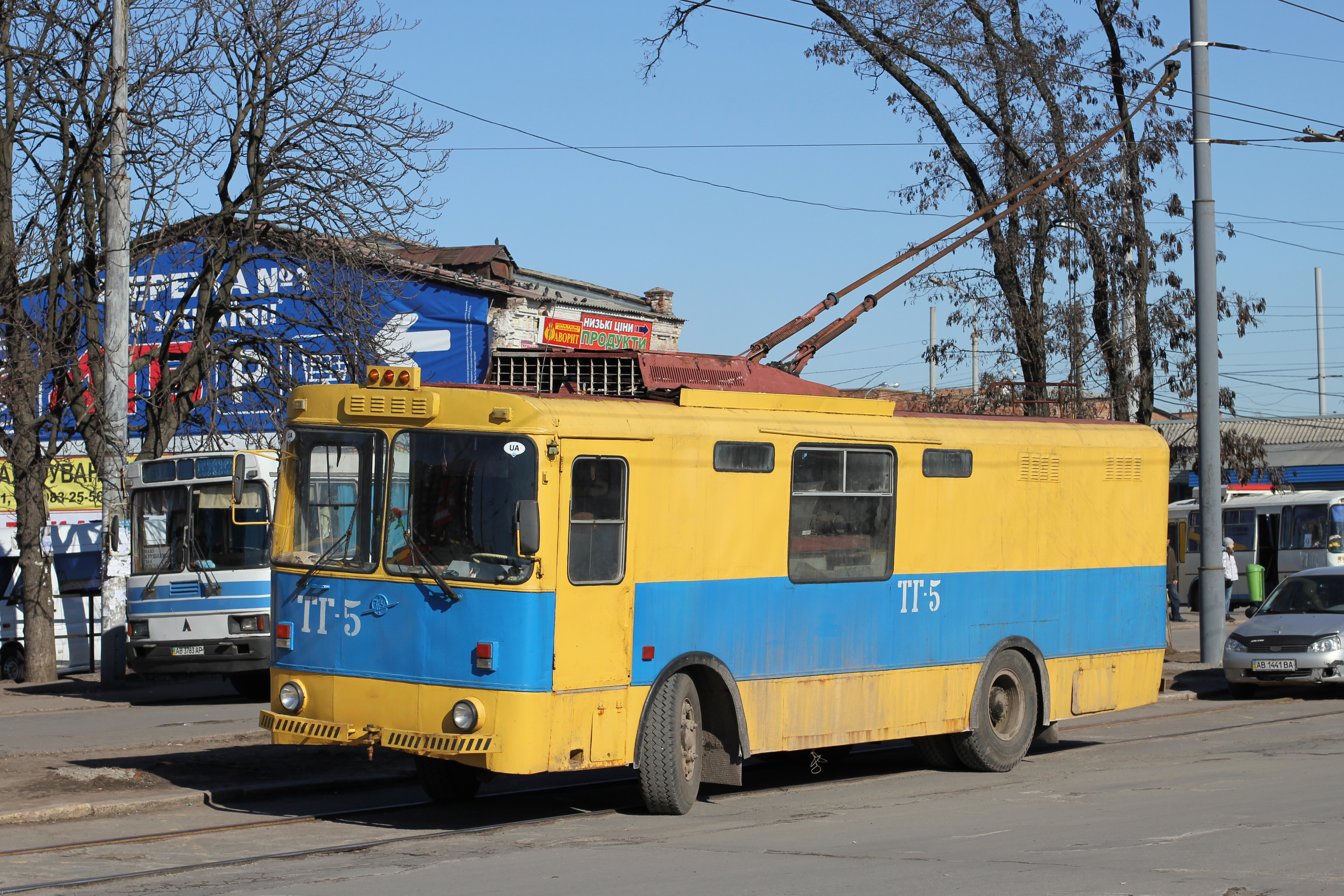
Service wagon TG-05 in Vinnytsia, Ukraine, in 2013.

=== Sweden ===
The first public electrified motorway, part of the eHighway concept, opened in Sweden on June 22, 2016, on a section of European route E16 near Gävle. It allows hybrid Scania trucks to operate on electric power from overhead wires. Trolleytrucks have also been used in Swedish mining operations, including at the mines in Kiruna and Malmberget.

=== Switzerland ===
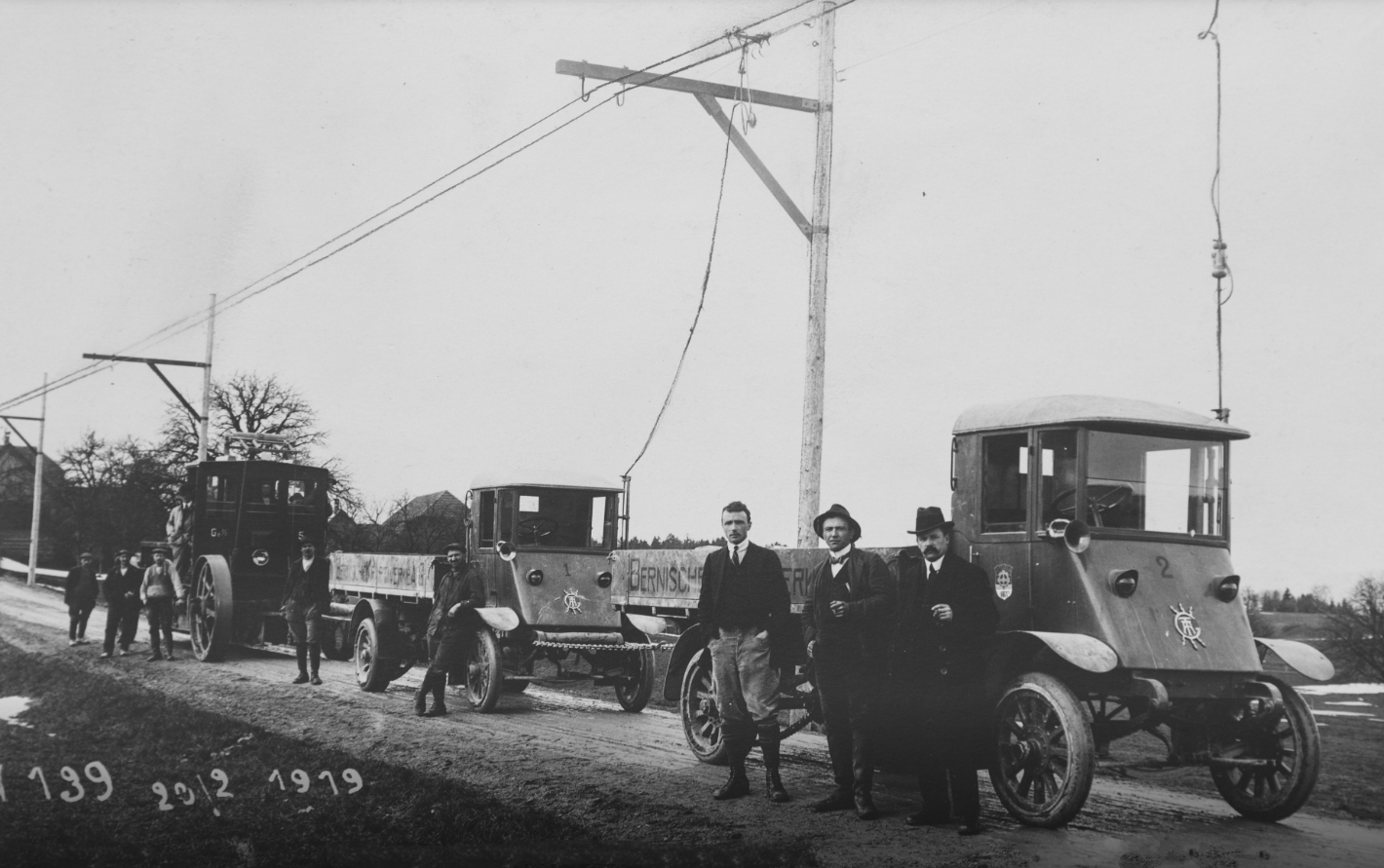
Trolleytrucks used for the construction of the Mühleberg dam in Switzerland (c. 1918-1922).

Trolleytrucks were used in Gümmenen and Mühleberg between 1918 and 1922 during the construction of the dam that retains Lake Wohlen. Another line, primarily for passengers but also carrying goods, operated between Fribourg and Farvagny from 1911 to 1932.

=== United States ===
Trolleytrucks have been used in mining and construction projects in the United States.

==== Michigan ====
From 1939 to 1964, the International Salt Company used converted 20-ton Euclid models in its underground salt mine in River Rouge, Michigan. Batteries were used for off-wire maneuvering.

==== California ====
From 1956 to 1971, the Riverside Cement Company operated converted 30-ton Kenworth dump trucks at its Crestmore Quarry near Riverside, California. In 2017, a one-mile eHighway demonstration project was launched near the Ports of Los Angeles and Long Beach, using trucks built by Mack Trucks in cooperation with Siemens.

==== New Mexico ====
The Chino Mine near Santa Rita, New Mexico installed a trolley-assist system in 1967. Diesel engines were used for normal operation, with electric power providing assistance on the steep ramp into the mine.

==== Nevada ====
Barrick Gold's Goldstrike mine used a trolley-assist system from 1994 to 2001, when it was decommissioned due to a reconfiguration of the mine.

=== Zambia ===
From 1983 into the late 1980s, the Zambia Consolidated Copper Mines Nchanga Mine used trolley-assist for its 120-ton diesel haul trucks. The system was powered by inexpensive hydroelectricity from the Kariba Dam.

== See also ==
- In-motion charging electric bus
- Freight tram
- Dump truck
- Electric truck
- Hybrid electric vehicle
- Parallel overhead lines
- Trolleybus
