= Schalker Eisenhütte Maschinenfabrik =

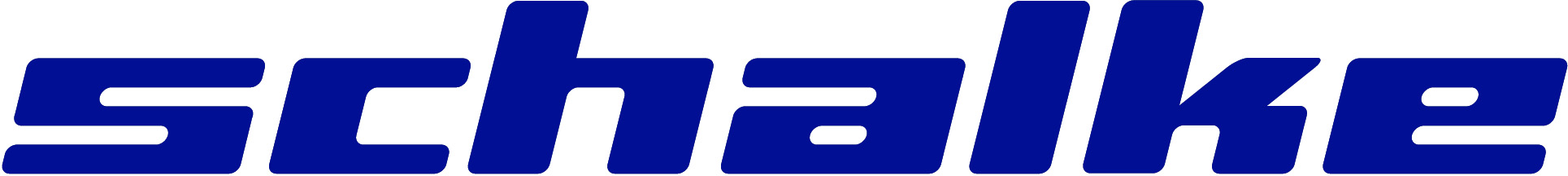
- Industry: Engineering
- Founded: 1872
- Headquarters: Gelsenkirchen, Germany
- Products: Coking oven equipment Industrial locomotives
- Parent: Eickhoff Group
- Website: schalke.eu

Schalker Eisenhütte Maschinenfabrik GmbH is a German engineering company, a manufacturer of industrial locomotives and coking furnaces.

== History ==
The company was founded in Schalke, Gelsenkirchen, in 1872 by Friedrich Grillo with backing from the Grevel family, as Vogelsang & Co. In 1886 the company became Gewerkschaft Schalker Eisenhütte.

In 1882 the company produced its first machine for pushing coke out of a coke oven, and by 1900 was manufacturing a range of equipment for the mechanisation of coke production, including coke wagons and locomotives.

In 1937 the company began production of electrically powered mining locomotives with equipment from AEG, BBC, and Siemens.

During the Second World War the factory was heavily damaged in two bombing raids. Post war the company continued in its main business areas of coke oven equipment and industrial locomotives. The company was acquired by Eickhoff of Bochum in 1968.

Towards the end of the first decade of the 21st century the company developed its first main line locomotive, the SDE 1800, a 4 axle Bo'Bo' diesel electric, off-centre cab design with an installed power of up to 1.8MW, designed for freight and shunting. The prototype was completed in 2011.

According to the company's works council and union IG Metall, the SDE 1800 project was too large for the company, with development costs for the locomotive contributing to the company accumulating losses since 2010. In August 2012, with cumulative losses reportedly twenty million euros, the company was restructured, with a reduction in workforce; approximately 155 of the workforce of 210 workers were to be transferred to other Eickoff group companies, with approximately 25 jobs losses overall.

== See also ==
- CarGoTram, freight tram vehicle manufactured by Schalker for Volkswagen
