= Wilhelm Grillo =

German industrialist (1819–1889)

Wilhelm Theodor Grillo (15 October 1819 – 23 January 1889) was a German entrepreneur and industrialist.

== Biography ==
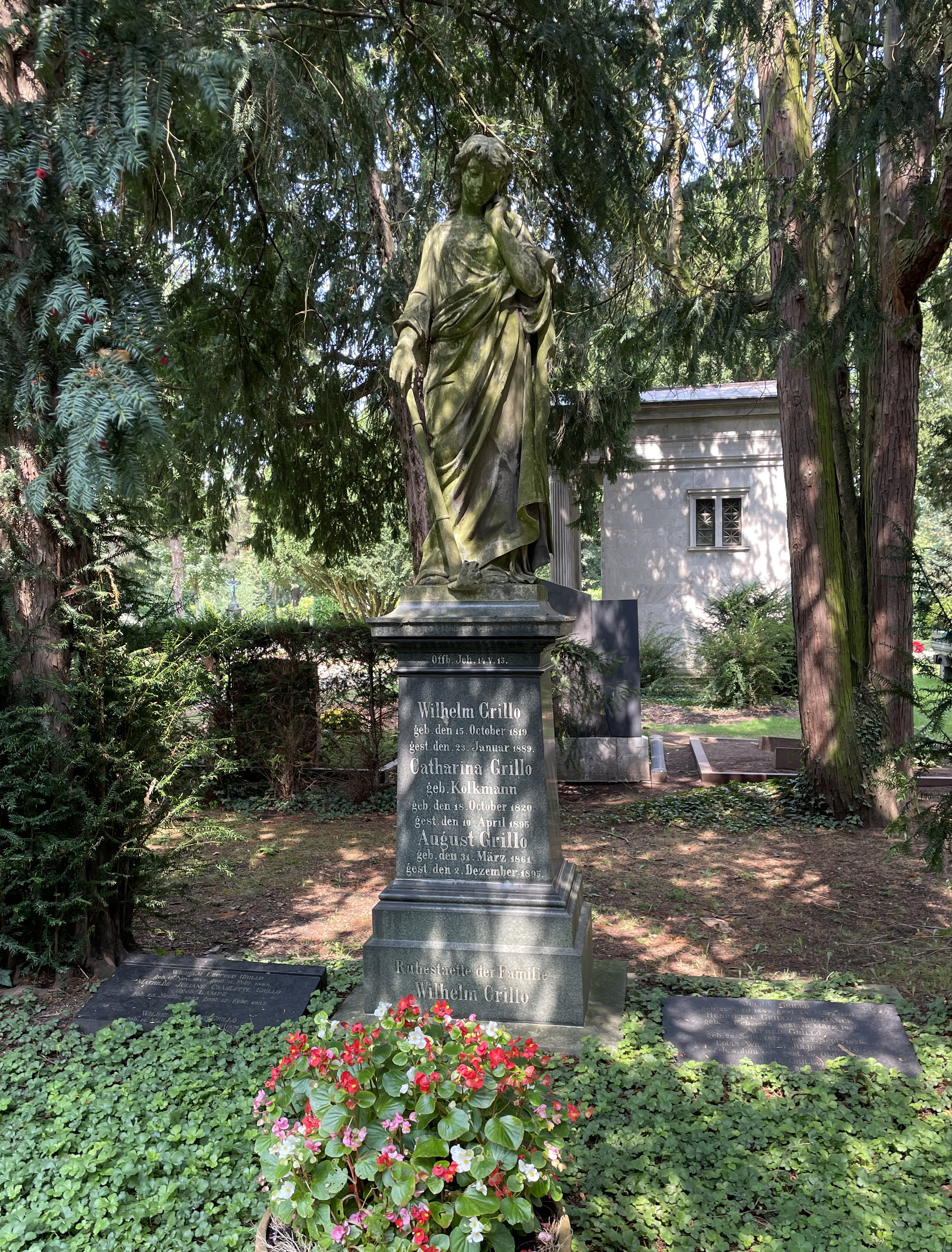
The family tomb of Wilhelm Grillo, adorned with a marble angel sculpture, is located in Düsseldorf's North Cemetery.

Born in Essen, Germany, in 1819 as the elder son of merchant Wilhelm Grillo, Wilhelm attended high school and completed a commercial apprenticeship. In 1842, at the age of 23, he founded an ironware trading business in Mülheim an der Ruhr. From there, Grillo engaged in numerous mining projects—sometimes collaborating with his younger brothers Friedrich (1825–1888) and August Grillo (1823–1897) or his brother-in-law Daniel Morian, and other times acting independently. His ventures spanned Essen, Mülheim, Hamborn, Oberhausen, Gelsenkirchen, Herne, and Wanne. Together with his brothers and brother-in-law, he established the Styrum ironworks near Mülheim, which began operations in 1857.

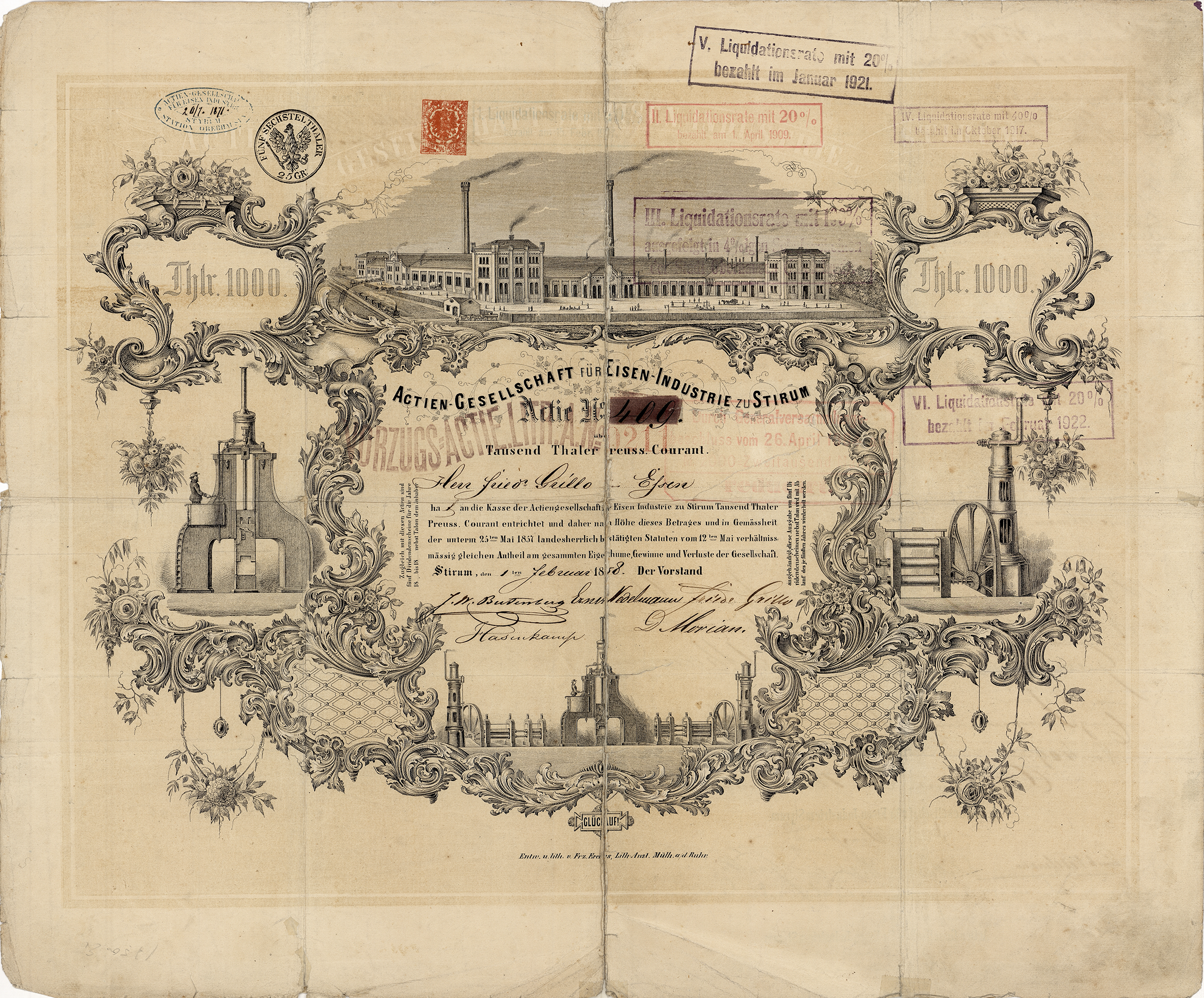
A founder's share of the Actien-Gesellschaft Eisen-Industrie zu Stirum for 1, 000 Prussian thalers, issued in Styrum on 1 February 1858, and made out to Friedrich Grillo in Essen, bears signatures from board members, including Friedrich Grillo, Ernst Nedelmann, and Daniel Morian. This ironworks, established by Wilhelm Theodor Grillo, was among the most significant companies in the Ruhr coal region during its time.

Grillo had a particular interest in zinc and the zinc pigment industry. In 1849, he founded a zinc rolling mill in Neumühl, followed by two rolling mills and a zinc white production facility in Oberhausen in 1855. In 1881, he opened a zinc smelting plant in Hamborn and, in 1865, a zinc welding facility in Mülheim an der Ruhr. The Grillo gasworks provided lighting for the factory's own network and Oberhausen's municipal gas grid. Grillo's activities significantly contributed to the industrial development of Oberhausen, Hamborn, and Mülheim an der Ruhr.

The company he founded continues today as Grillo-Werke in Duisburg-Marxloh. With 1, 400 employees, it generates annual revenue of approximately €860 million and remains wholly owned by Wilhelm Grillo's descendants.

Grillo was married to Catharina Kolkmann (1820–1895) from 1843. The couple had nine children: four daughters and five sons, including Wilhelm (1845–1888), Julius (1849–1911), Friedrich (1858–1919), and August (1861–1895).
