= Friedrich Grillo =

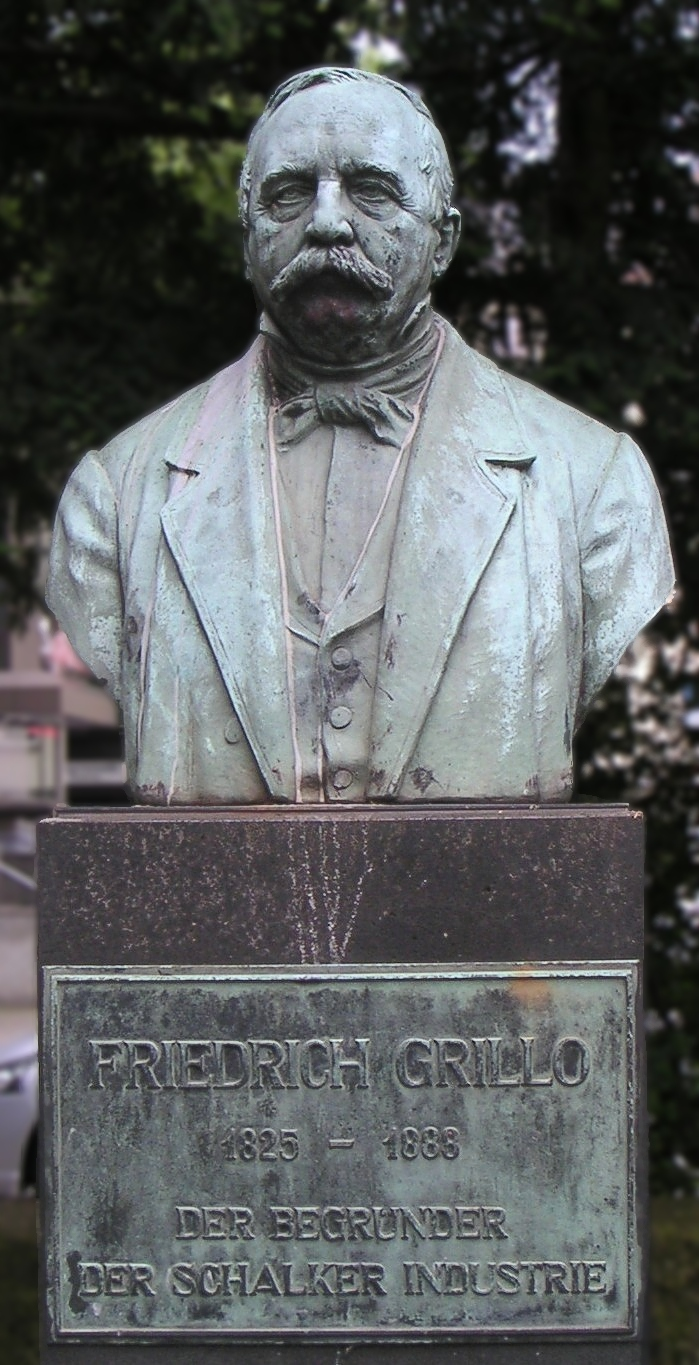
Friedrich Grillo monument in the Grillostrasse, Gelsenkirchen

Henrich Friedrich Theodor Ernst Grillo (20 December 1825, Essen – 16 April 1888, Düsseldorf-Grafenberg) was an industrialist in the Ruhr area of Germany, particularly in Essen and Gelsenkirchen.

Born the son of an Essen merchant, into a Protestant family of Italian origin (his ancestors came from Valtellina, from which they fled due to religious persecutions), together with his brother, Wilhelm he took over his father's enterprise and expanded the range of trade, becoming an influential businessman. Grillo was a board member and founder of several mining companies, including the Schalker Eisenhütte (ironworks) in 1872.

Friedrich Grillo and, after his death, his widow Wilhelmine Grillo donated the property and two-thirds of the construction costs of the Grillo-Theater, which opened in Essen in 1892.
