= Antonio Grillo (footballer, born 1986) =

Italian footballer

Personal information
- Date of birth: 21 February 1986 (age 40)
- Place of birth: Venaria Reale, Italy
- Height: 1.83 m (6 ft 0 in)
- Position: Defender

Team information
- Current team: Derthona

Senior career*
Years	Team	Apps	(Gls)
2003–2004	Cirié	26	(0)
2004–2005	Bolzano	31	(0)
2005–2007	Alessandria	43	(0)
2007–2009	Canavese	53	(1)
2009–2010	Cavese	12	(0)
2010	Varese	4	(0)
2010	Albese	17	(1)
2010–2011	Rivoli	15	(0)
2011–2013	Pro Settimo & Eureka		
2014–2016	Pinerolo		
2016–2017	LG Trino		
2017–2019	Borgaro Nobis	48	(1)
2019–	Derthona		
- * Club domestic league appearances and goals as of 23:40, 4 November 2019 (UTC)

Antonio Grillo (born 21 February 1986, in Venaria Reale, Piedmont) is an Italian football defender who plays for Derthona.

== Career ==
Ahead of the 2019-20 season, Grillo joined Derthona.

== Appearances in Serie C2 and Serie D ==
Serie C2 : 53 Apps, 1 Goal

Serie D : 100 Apps
