= Antonio Grillo (footballer, born 1991) =

Italian footballer

Personal information
- Date of birth: 8 December 1991 (age 34)
- Place of birth: Avellino, Italy
- Height: 1.77 m (5 ft 9 1/2 in)
- Position: Midfielder

Senior career*
Years	Team	Apps	(Gls)
2009–2010	Potenza	1	(0)
2010–2011	Forza e Coraggio	5	(0)
2011	Paganese	1	(0)
2012	Fondi	6	(0)
2012–2013	Campobasso	1	(0)
2013–2014	Paganese	12	(1)
2014–2015	Parma	0	(0)
2014–2015	→ Salernitana (loan)	2	(0)
2015–2017	Salernitana	0	(0)
2015–2016	→ Paganese (loan)	7	(0)
2017–2018	Paganese	1	(0)
2018–2019	Pro Vercelli	0	(0)
2019	Rieti	4	(0)
- * Club domestic league appearances and goals as of 21:09, 9 May 2019 (UTC)

Antonio Grillo (born 8 December 1991) is an Italian football player.

== Career ==
On 29 July 2015, Salernitana signed Grillo from Parma after he had already been loaned to the club. On 31 August 2015, he was loaned to Paganese.
