= Giovanni Maria Nosseni =

Swiss sculptor

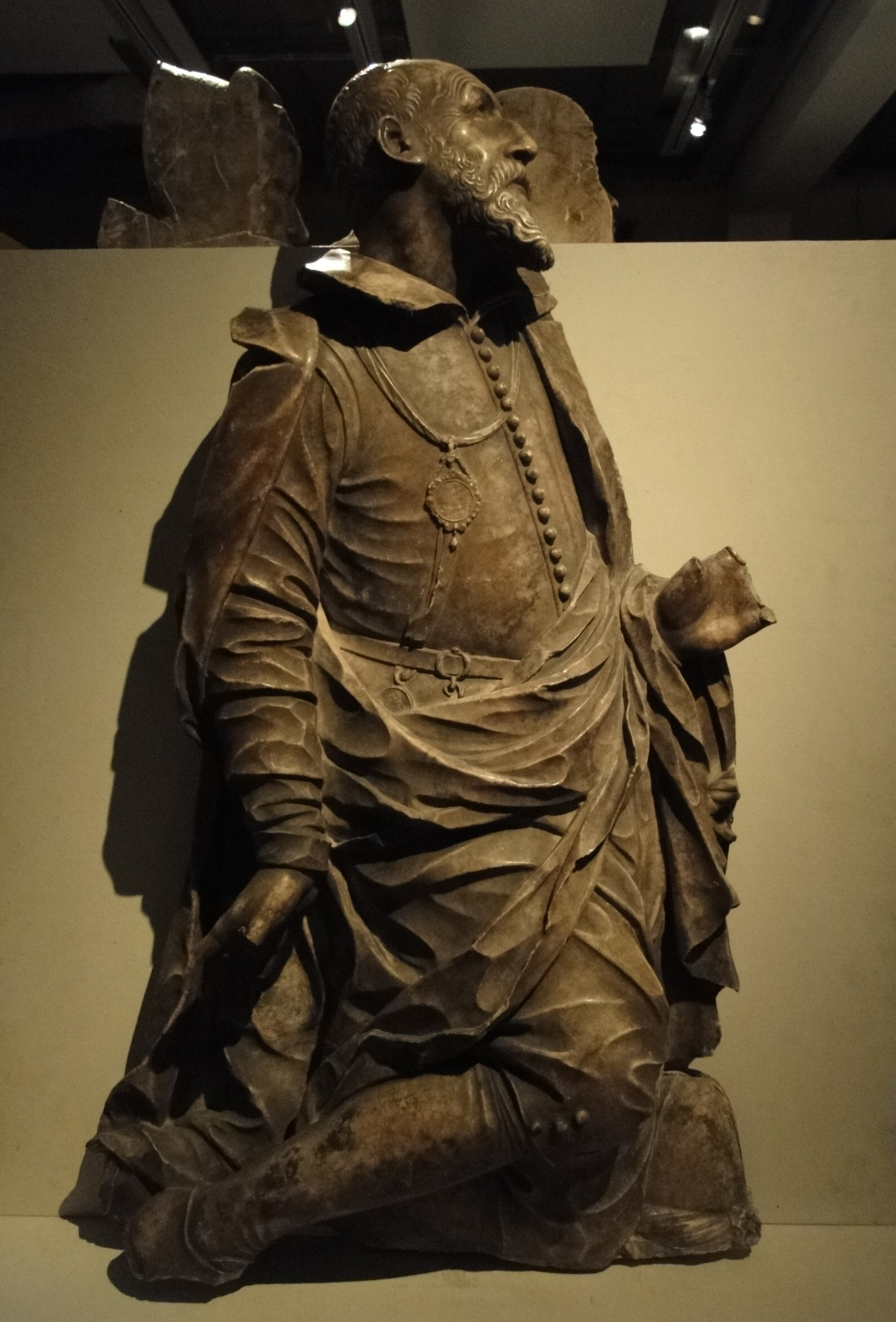
representation of Nosseni on his tomb, the Nosseni epitaph (1945 damaged)

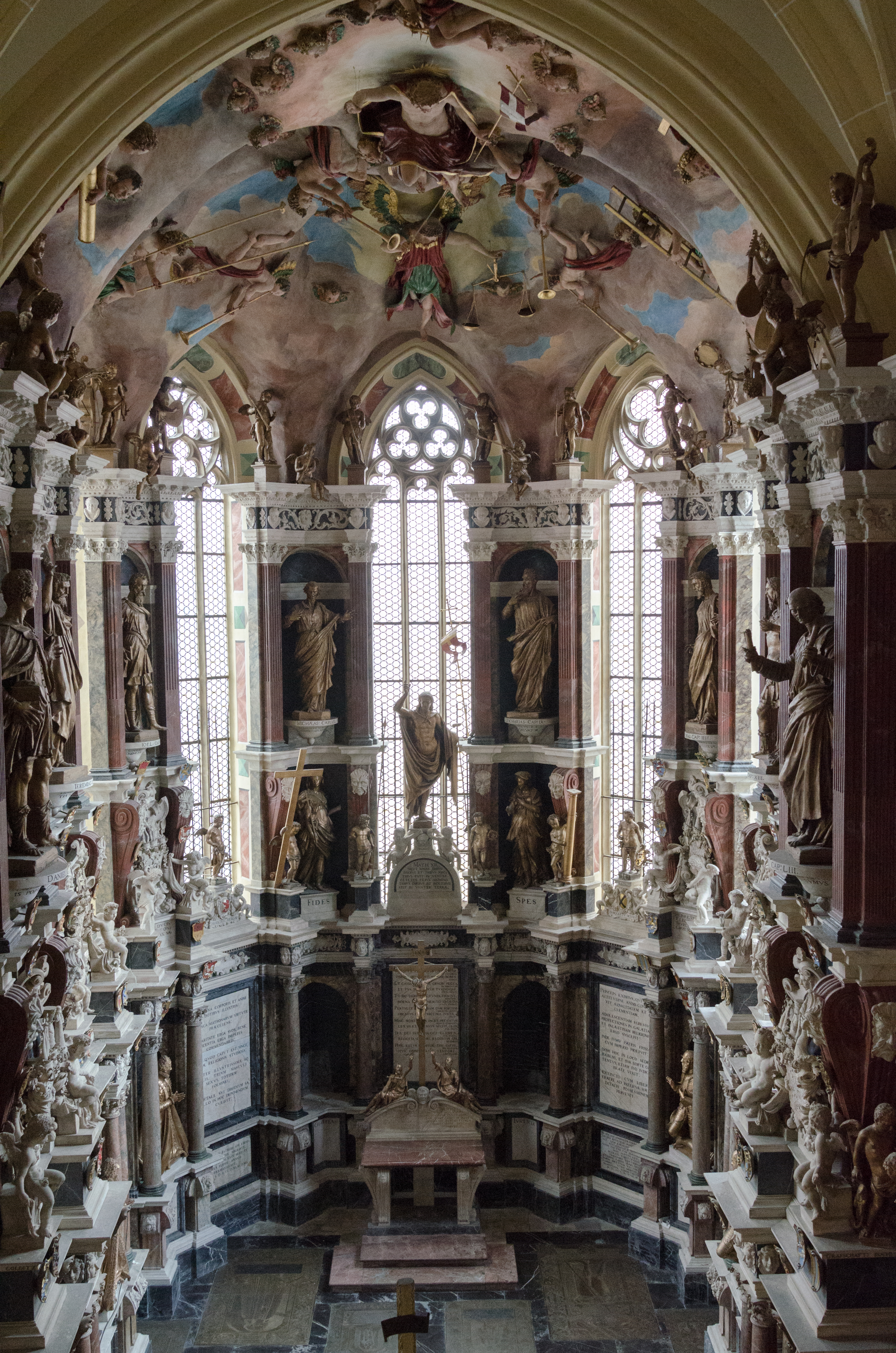
Burial chapel of the Wettins in Freiberg Cathedral (1585 onwards)

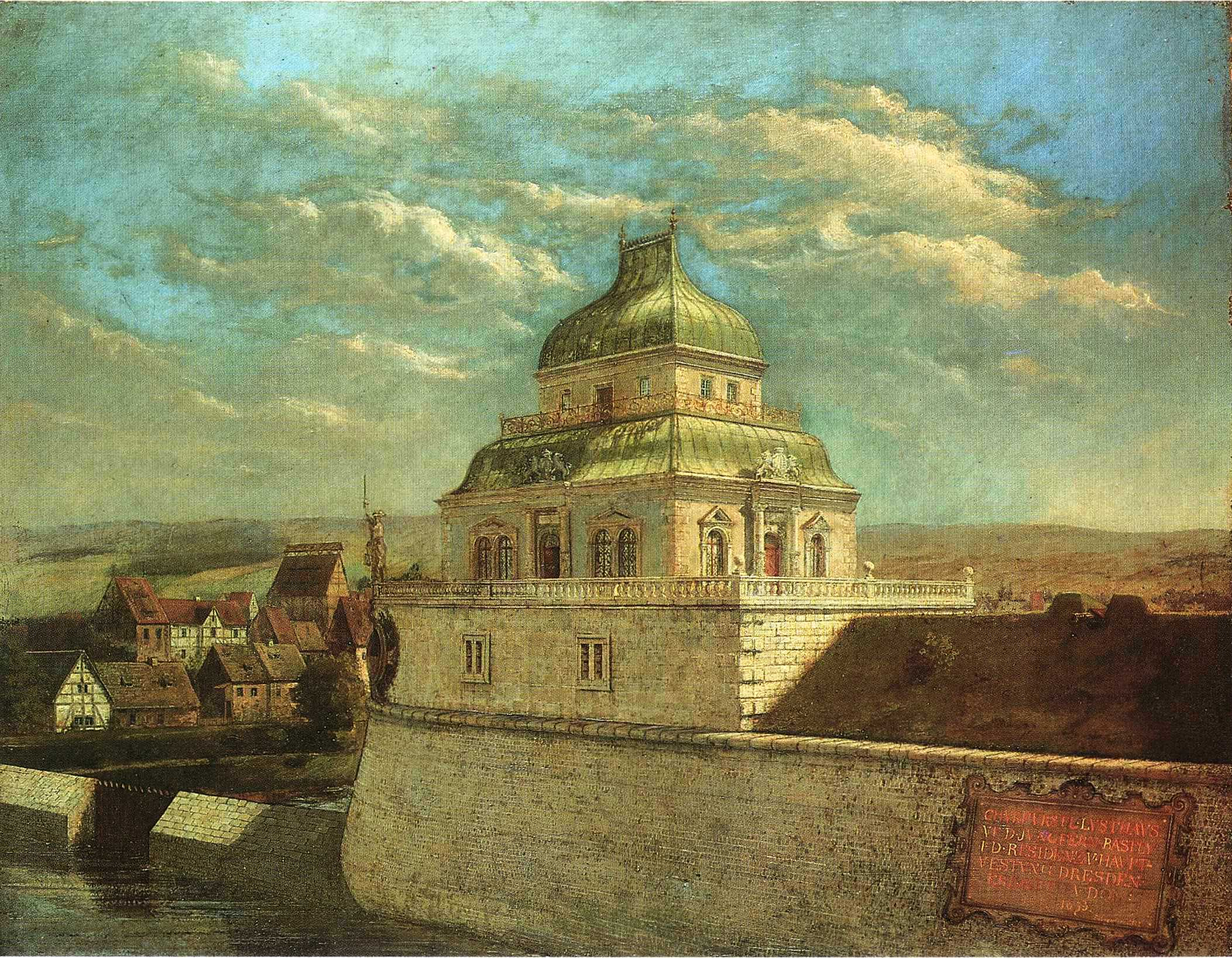
A modern reconstruction of the Belvedere in Dresden, built by Nosseni from 1590

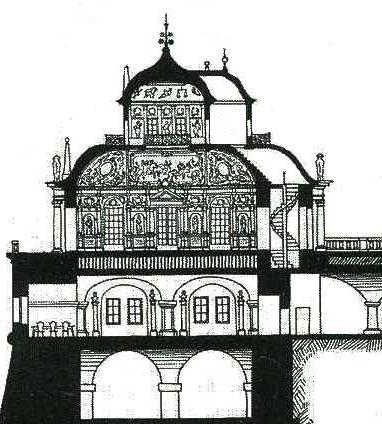
Section through the Belvedere built by Nosseni from 1590 onwards in a modern reconstruction

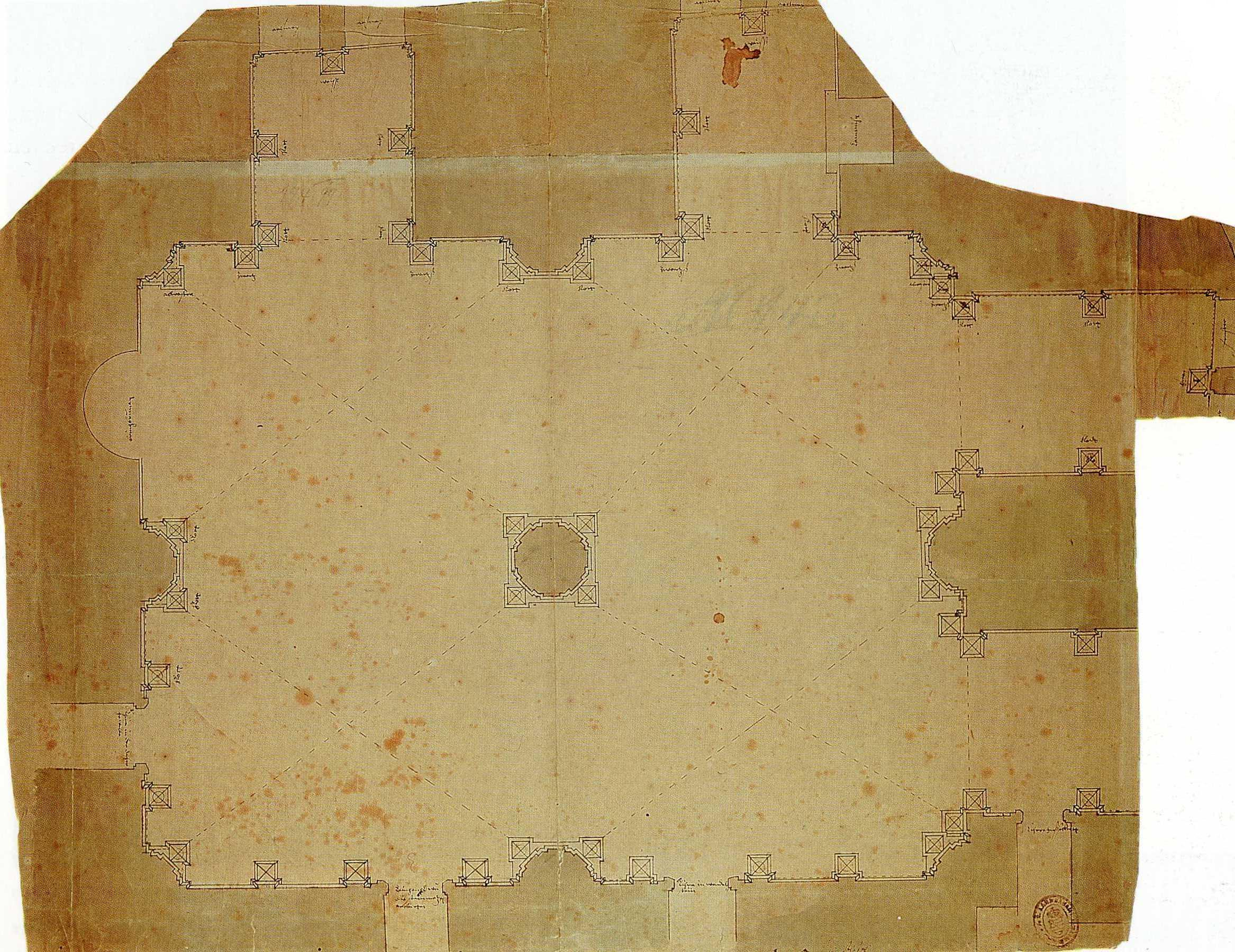
Period floor plan of the lower hall in the Belvedere

Giovanni (Johann) Maria Nosseni (1 May 1544 in Lugano – 20 September 1620 in Dresden) was a sculptor and architect from the Italian-speaking Switzerland (Ticino) working at the Saxon court at Dresden.

== Life ==
Giovanni (Johann) Maria Nosseni appeared at the end of January 1575 with a journeyman in Dresden. Nosseni was employed as a painter and sculptor in July 1575. In Weißensee he had come closer to the Lutheran religion by listening to sermons and reading the Bible and changed his faith. In April 1576 he made a journey to Austria. On May 1, 1577, Nosseni married Elisabeth Unruh, the daughter of the former syndic of Liegnitz. He brought his father and his brother Pietro to Torgau.

On 26 May 1585 he acquired a house in Dresden. He was supposed to "convert it into a common town ornament", set up a workshop and warehouse, but was not granted tax exemption.

Elisabeth died on 13 February 1591, and his second marriage was on 3 February 1595 with Christiane Hanisch, the daughter of Mathias Hanisch, the Elector's District Administrator. She also died before him on 29 November 1606, and he married a third time to the twenty-year-old Anna Maria von Rehnen, the daughter of the Mint Master of the Mint of Dresden, Heinrich von Rehnen. On his tomb, the Nosseni epitaph, of which fragments are found in the Stadtmuseum Dresden, Nosseni and his three wives are depicted.

== Works ==
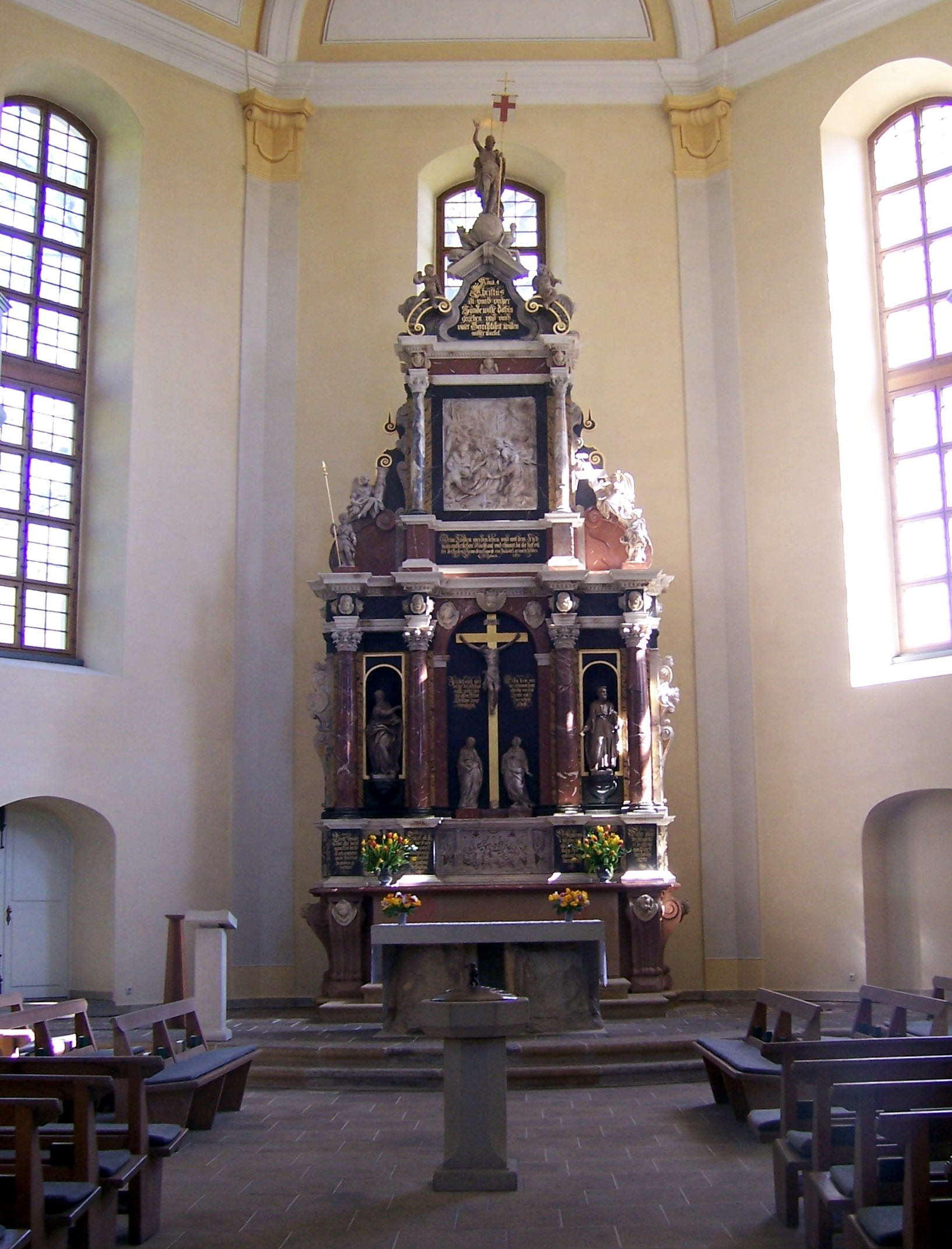
The Nosseni-Altar of the Sophienkirche in Dresden, designed by Nosseni in 1606/07, since 2002 altar of the Church in Loschwitz

In 1579 Nosseni had made two stone tables set with cups, bowls and dishes, two busts of Roman emperors and a chair with polished local stones. From 1580 to 1613 he supplied alabaster and serpentine.

In October 1580 Nosseni was suddenly dismissed. He asked to be allowed to collect the finished works from his workshop, but to keep the unfinished ones.

During the negotiations that followed, the first ideas for the Freiberg funeral chapel came up. In 1583 he was again in the service of the Elector. On 5 May 1585 he was prescribed 20 years to work in the marble quarry he had discovered near Lengefeld in the Erzgebirge. In 1586 and 1587 he discovered black marble at Grünau, red marble at Wildenfels and white marble at Crottendorf.

At the beginning of October 1585 Paul Buchner and Nosseni went to Freiberg to see burials in the choir of the Freiberg Cathedral, "as there a princely crypt would like to be furnished". They built several models. The Saxon elector Christian I. commissioned Nosseni to complete the funeral chapel. At the beginning of September 1588 Nosseni went to Italy in order to get sculptors, founders and stonemasons for the monumental building at Freiberg. He also visited his parents in Lugano. On 23 October he arrived in Florence, where he recruited Carlo de Cesare, who later cast the bronze statues in Freiberg. On the way back via Modena he acquired 180 painted and gilded shields (rondelles) for the stable building and in Venice 600 crystal glasses from Murano for the Dresden court. On 31 December he arrived in Dresden.

From 1590 onwards, the Belvedere on the Brühlsche Terrasse in Dresden was built according to Nosseni's plans, of which, however, only the lower storey was built until the death of Christian I, and work was stopped here as well. Until its destruction in 1747, the Belvedere was one of the sights of Dresden. Due to this loss, today there is no precise idea of this main work of Nosseni.

In 1590 he was granted a privilege for 20 years to mine and use marble, alabaster and Semi-precious stones, which was extended to him for life in 1609.

In 1607 Count Ernst von Holstein-Schaumburg began planning his princely mausoleum at Stadthagen and commissioned Nosseni to design it. However, the construction of the building did not begin until the year of Nosseni's death in 1620 and was carried out by his pupil Anton Boten.

== See also ==
- Nosseni Altar

== Sources ==
- Monika Meine-Schawe (1999). "Nosseni, Giovanni Maria". Neue Deutsche Biographie (in German). Vol. 19. Berlin: Duncker & Humblot. pp. 349–350. (full text online).
- Viktor Hantzsch (1906). "Nosseni, Giovanni" . Allgemeine Deutsche Biographie (in German). Vol. 52. Leipzig: Duncker & Humblot. pp. 659–663.
- Damian Dombrowski (2001), Die Grablege der sächsischen Kurfürsten zu Freiberg. Ideelle Dimensionen eines internationalen Monuments. In: Zeitschrift für Kunstgeschichte 64, pp. 234–272.
- Jürgen Müller (2004), Giovanni Maria Nosseni und die Dresdner Kunst zwischen 1580 und 1620. in: Dirk Syndram (ed.): In fürstlichem Glanz: der Dresdner Hof um 1600, Milan, pp. 34–45 (digital access).
- Barbara Marx (2007), Giovanni Maria Nosseni als Vermittler von italienischen Sammlungskonventionen und ästhetischen Normen am Dresdner Hof 1575-1620 in: Sybille Ebert-Schifferer (ed.): Scambio culturale con il nemico religioso: Italia e Sassonia attorno al 1600 (Akten zum internationalen Studientag der Serie "Roma e il nord - percorsi e forme dello scambio artistico", 4./5. April 2005, Rom, Bibliotheca Hertziana), Milan, pp. 99–128.
- Walter May (1992), Die höfische Architektur in Dresden unter Christian I. in: Dresdner Hefte 29, pp. 63–71. digital access.
