= Paul Buchner =

German architect and geometer (1531–1607)

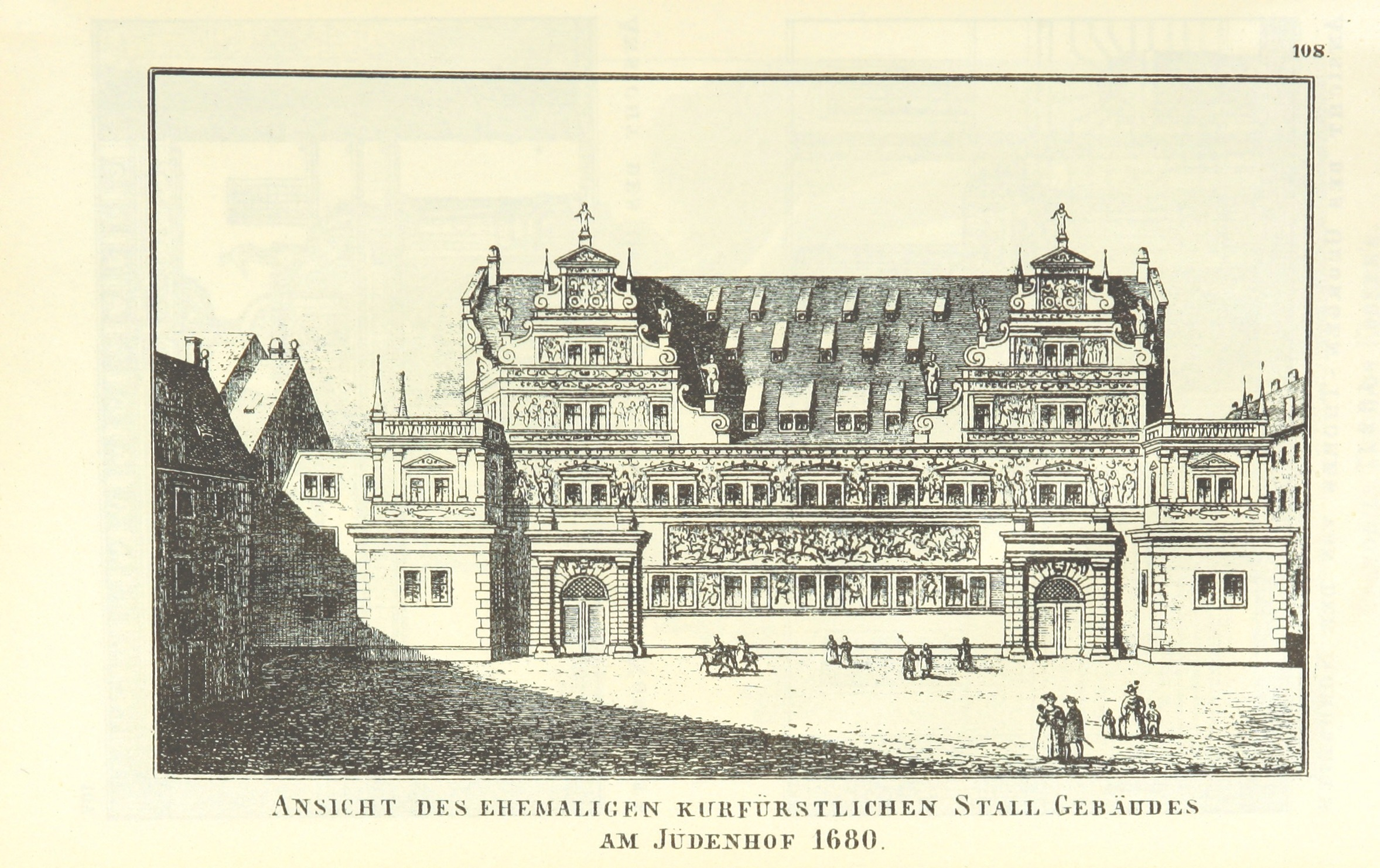
The Stable Building at the Jüdenhof, designed by Paul Buchner, in a picture from 1680

Paul Buchner (June 1531 – 13 November 1607) was a German architect, geometer, carpenter and screw maker from Nuremberg.

== Life ==
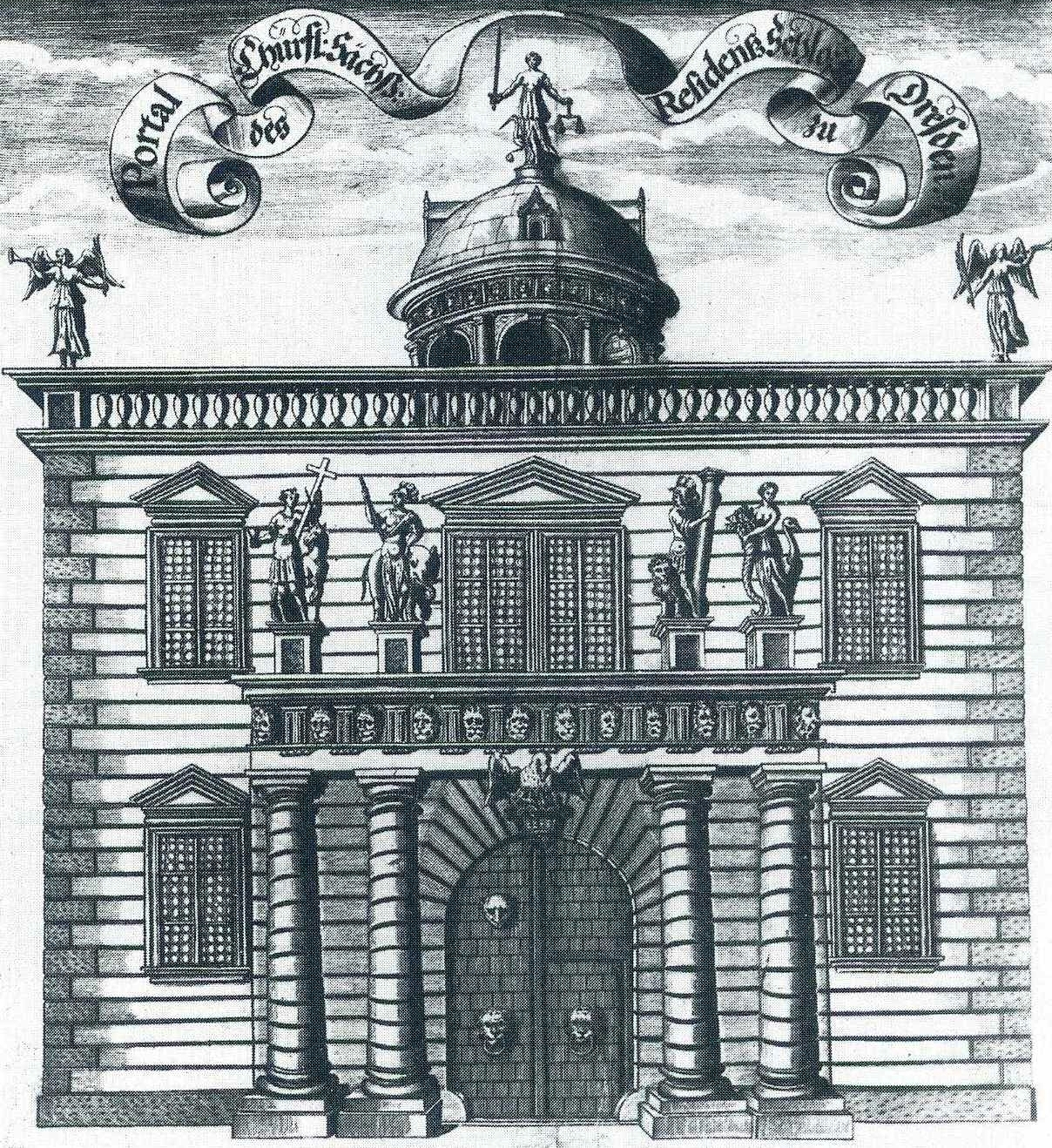
Dresden Portal Schlossgasse of the Residenzschloss, engraving from the Weck Chronicle 1680

Buchner grew up in Nuremberg and was an apprentice carpenter and screw maker, training under his cousin, Leonhard Danner. In 1556 he worked for Queen Elizabeth I in London, where his job was to produce screws which would be used to strengthen fortifications. In 1557 Duke Emmanuel Philibert of Savoy invited him to Brussels.

On a recommendation from Leonhard Danner, who supplied military equipment for the Saxon court, August of Saxony invited Buchner in 1558 to Dresden. He made screw tools before being appointed as an electoral master craftsman in 1559, then became commander of the Dresden arsenal in 1563. He worked with Voigt von Wierandt, an experienced architect and master builder. Starting in 1567 he supervised the expansion of Dresden's fortifications. Due to his extensive knowledge of fortress construction and weapons technology, Buchner was appointed as a master of the house and land of Dresden in 1575. He was then responsible for all fortifications and armories throughout Saxony.

From 1586 to 1590, Buchner built the Dresden Stallgebäude (the Stable Building) at the Jüdenhof under Elector Christian I. It is likely that he collaborated with the Italo Swiss artist Giovanni Maria Nosseni on various buildings, such as the Langer Gang at the Stallhof in Dresden and the gate to the Kleiner Schlosshof.

Buchner was later married to Maria Kröß, the daughter of a chamber servant in the Electorate of Saxony and the mayor of Dresden, Bastian Kröß. Together, Buchner and Kröß were the parents of the scholar August Buchner.

Buchner died in 1607 in Dresden, and was buried at the Frauenkirchhof in Dresden.

The medalist Tobias Wolff made a portrait medal of Paul Buchner depicting him at the age of 49.

== Works ==
- Collaboration on the Dresden Armoury (Zeughaus) - 1559-1563
- Conversion of Wilsdruffer Gate at Dresden - 1568
- Powder Mill at Dresden - 1574-1575
- Conversion of Castle Gommern into a hunting lodge - 1578
- Dresden Stallhof (Princely Stable Building) at the Jüdenhof (1586-1589) connected with Dresden Castle, today the Dresden Transport Museum
- Electoral Stable Building, also known as the "Old Castle" at Zabeltitz - 1588-1598
- Extension of the Königstein Fortress in 1589 (Gate House, Old Armoury, Guard House, Christiansburg)
- Pirna Gate at Dresden - 1590–1591, in collaboration with Giovanni Maria Nosseni
- Gate to the Kleiner Schlosshof, in collaboration with Giovanni Maria Nosseni
- Old Gewandhaus at Dresden - 1591
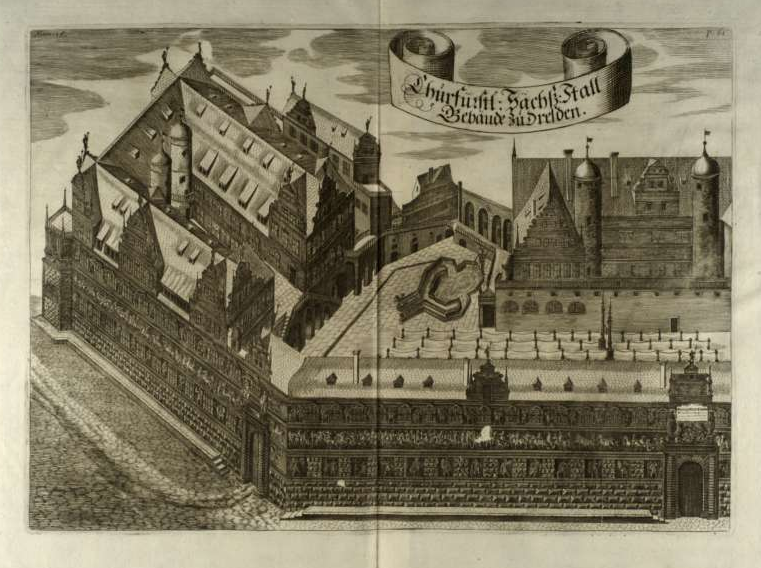
Stallgebäude and Stallhof Dresden, engraving 1680, by Anton Weck

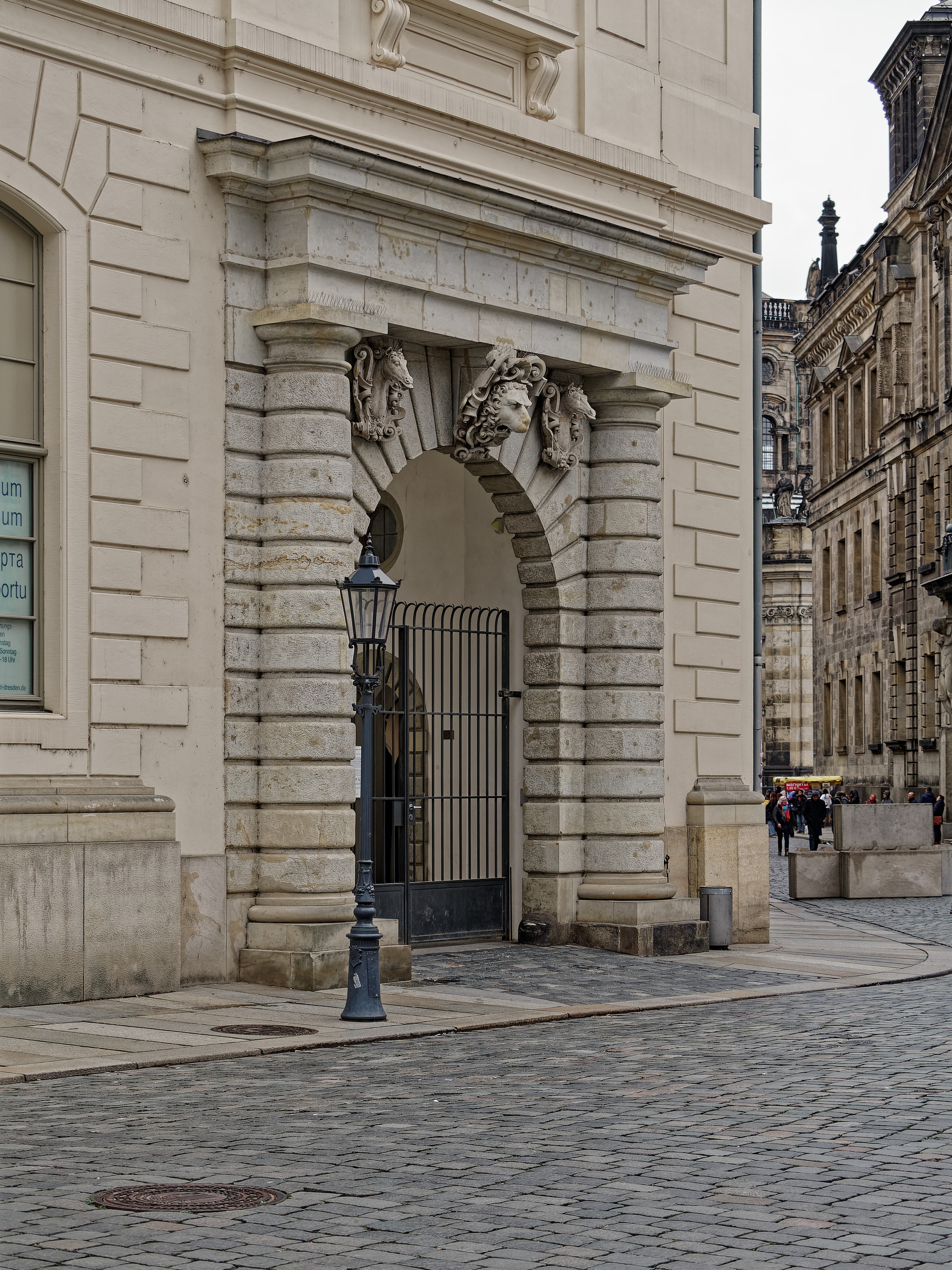
Entrance to the Stallhof Dresden

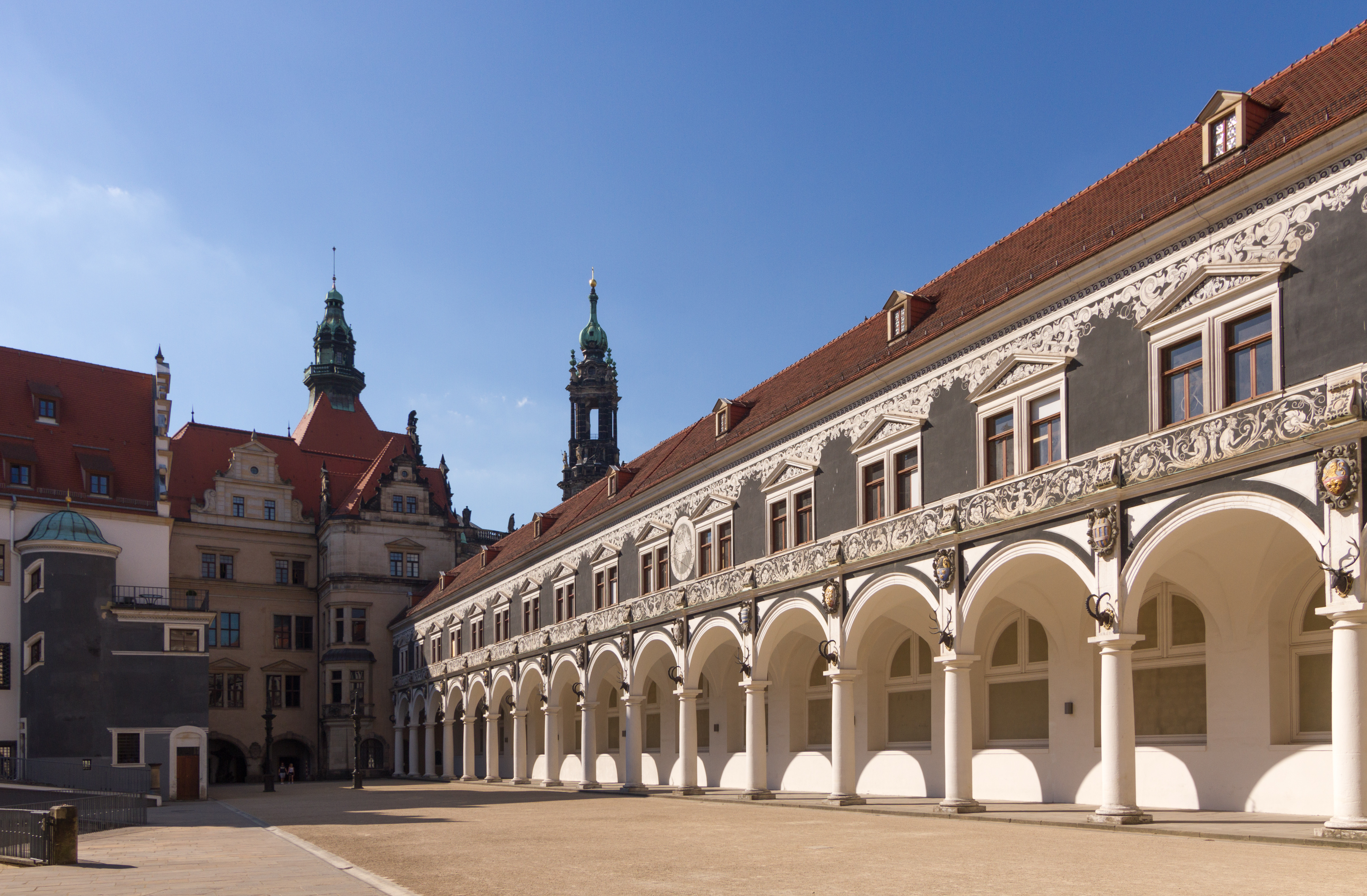
Langer Gang (long corridor) at the Stallhof Dresden, in collaboration with Giovanni Maria Nosseni

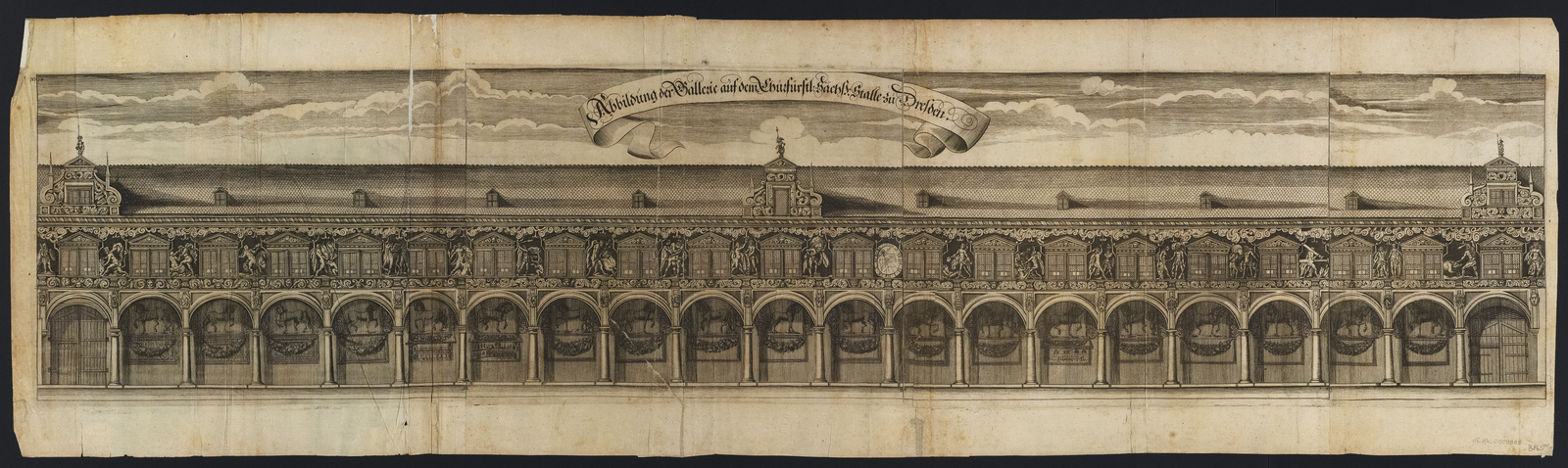
Langer Gang (long corridor) in the Stallhof Dresden, in collaboration with Giovanni Maria Nosseni, engraving 1680, by Anton Weck

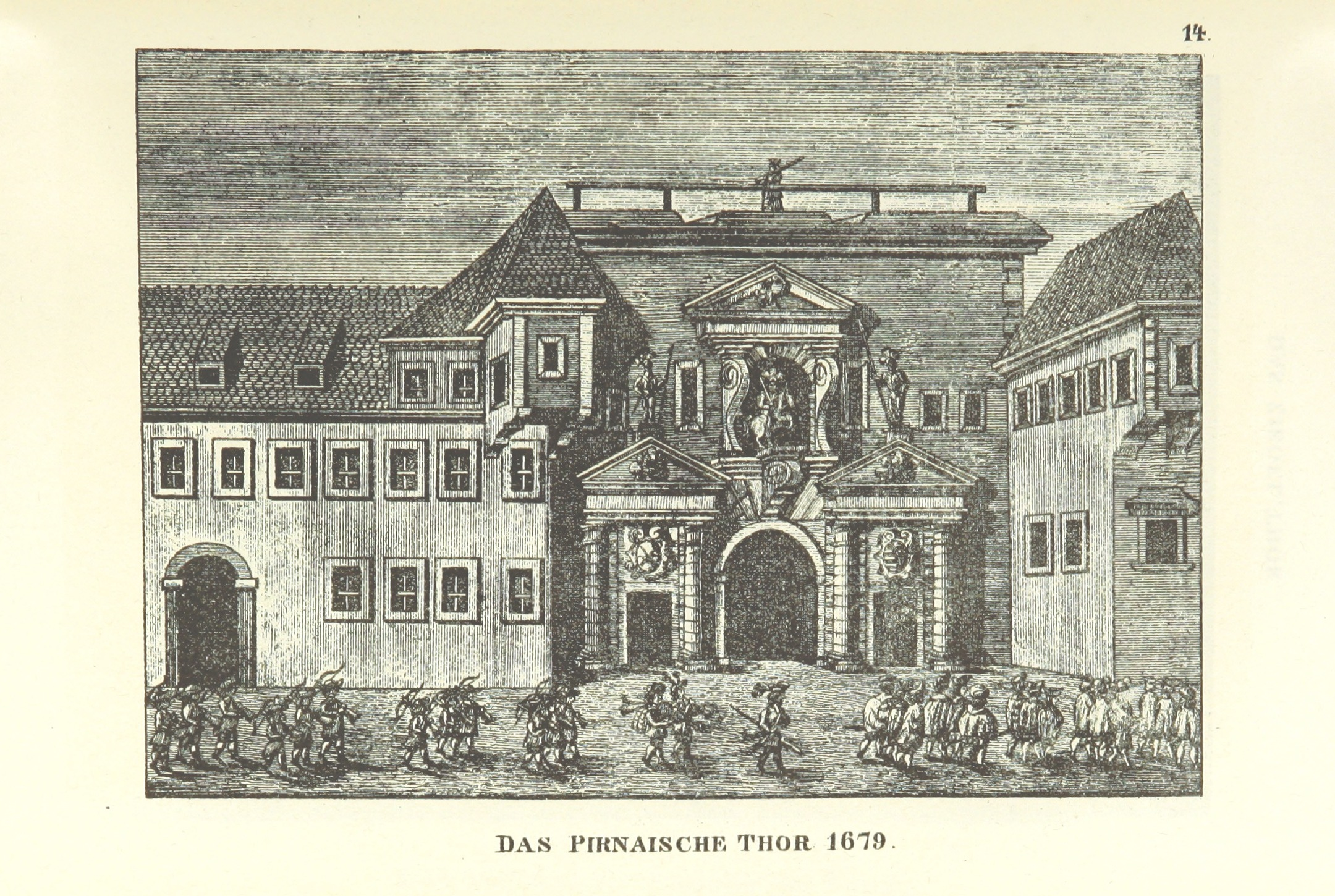
The Pirnaische Tor Dresden 1679, in collaboration with Giovanni Maria Nosseni

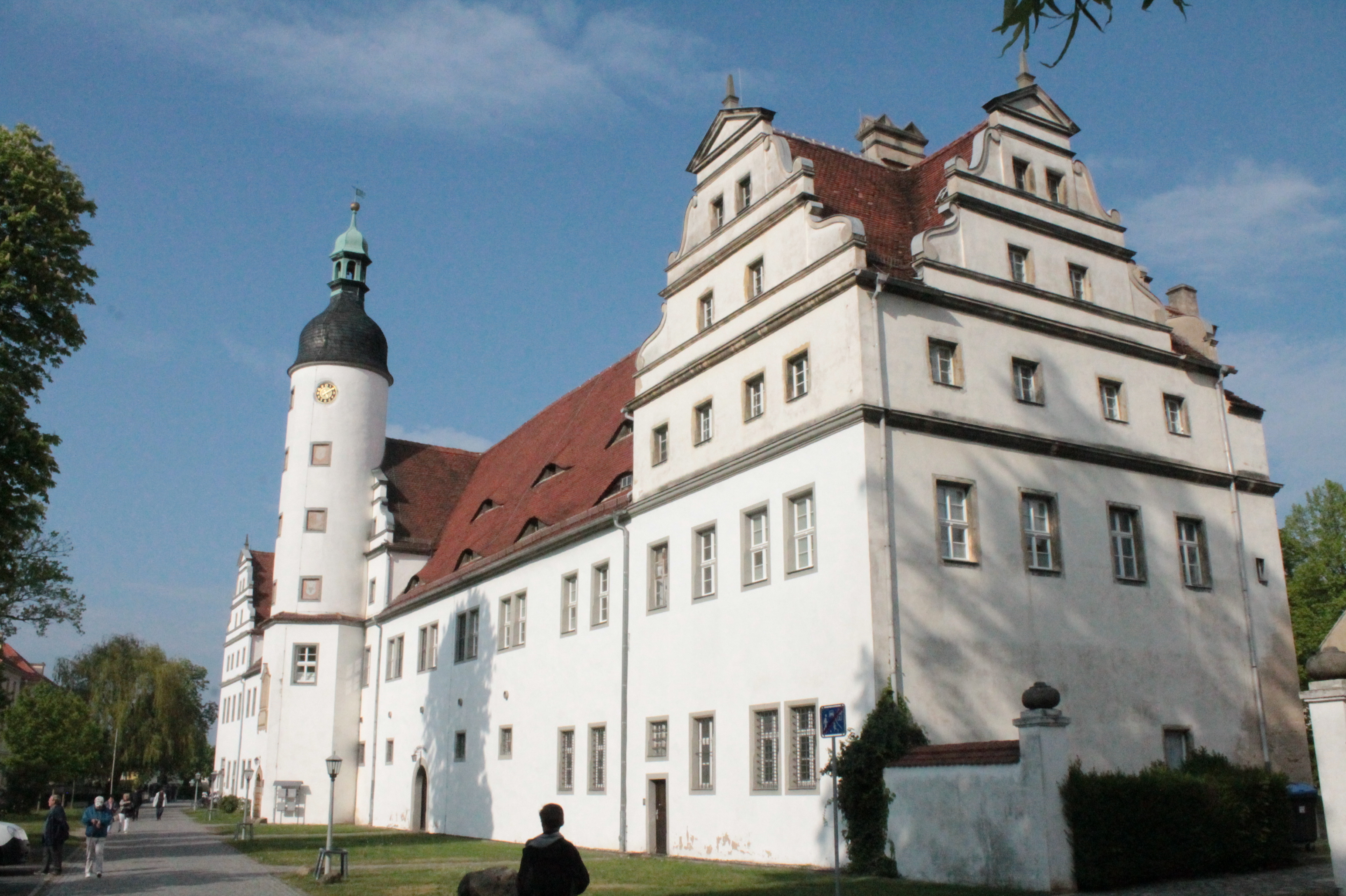
Zabeltitz Castle

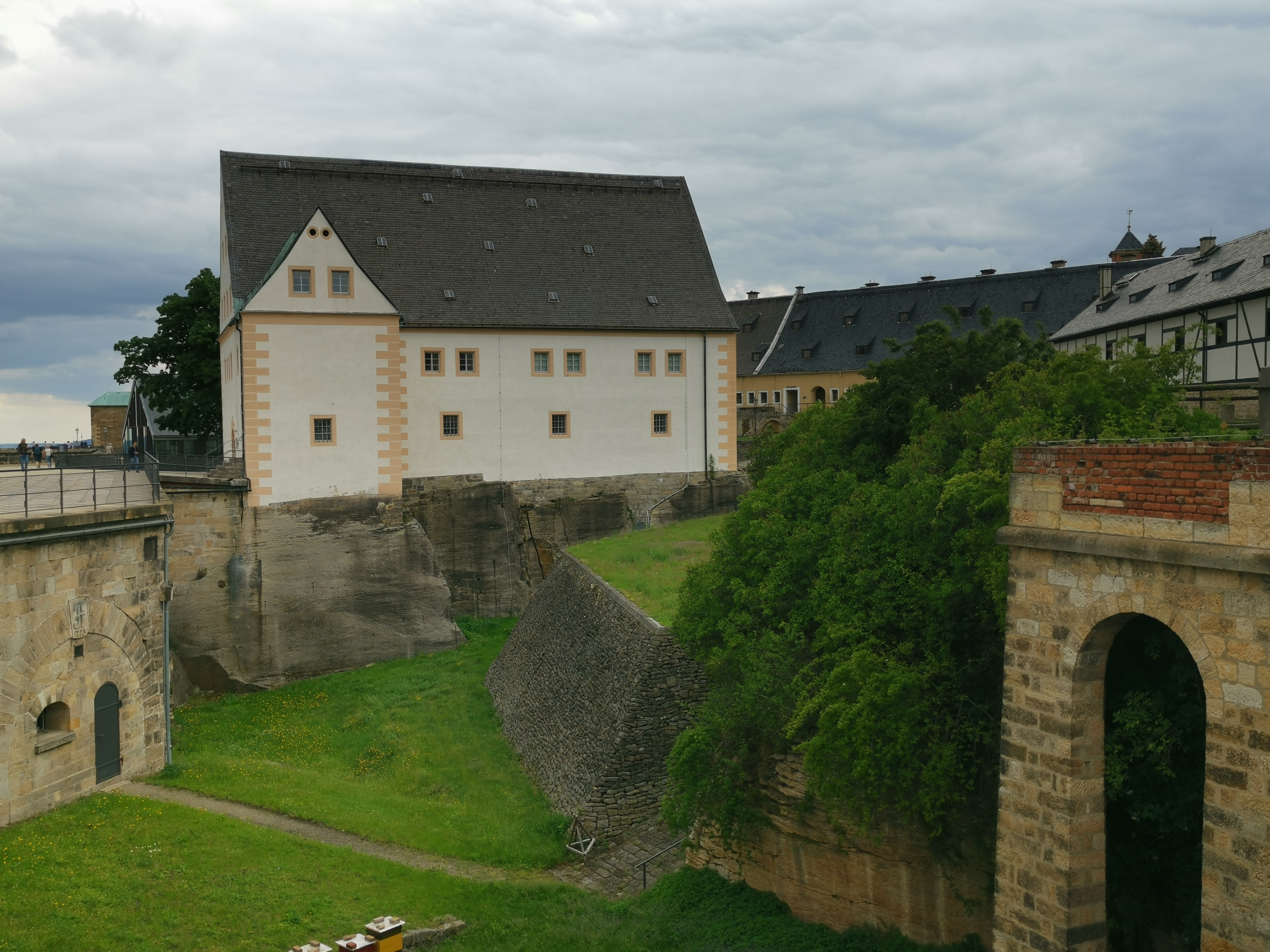
Königstein Fortress, Altes Zeughaus

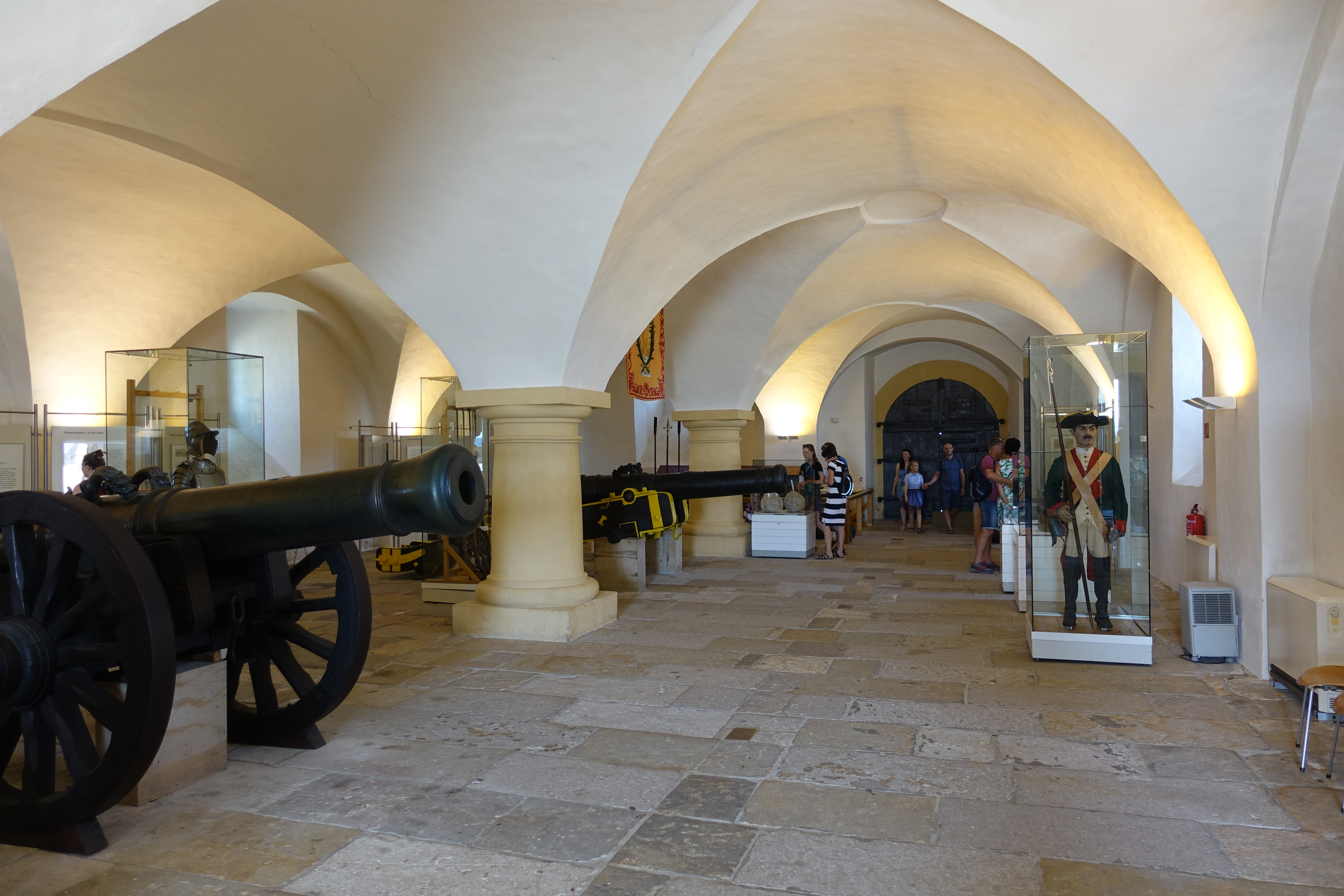
Königstein Fortress, Altes Zeughaus

== Sources ==
- Esther Hoppe-Münzberg: The Elector's Stable and Armory Chamber Building with Long Corridor and Stable Courtyard - a new construction task in the complex of the Dresden Residential Palace in: Saxony State Office for the Preservation of Monuments (Ed.): The Residence Palace of Dresden. Volume 2: The castle complex of the Renaissance and its early baroque alterations and decorations. Petersberg 2019, pp. 397–419.
- de:Richard Steche: Hans von Dehn-Rothfelser. Ein Beitrag zur Kunstgeschichte Sachsens (online at Google Books). Blochmann, Dresden 1877, on Buchner pp. 36–43.
