= Nosseni Altar =

Renaissance altar by the Swiss sculptor Giovanni Maria Nosseni

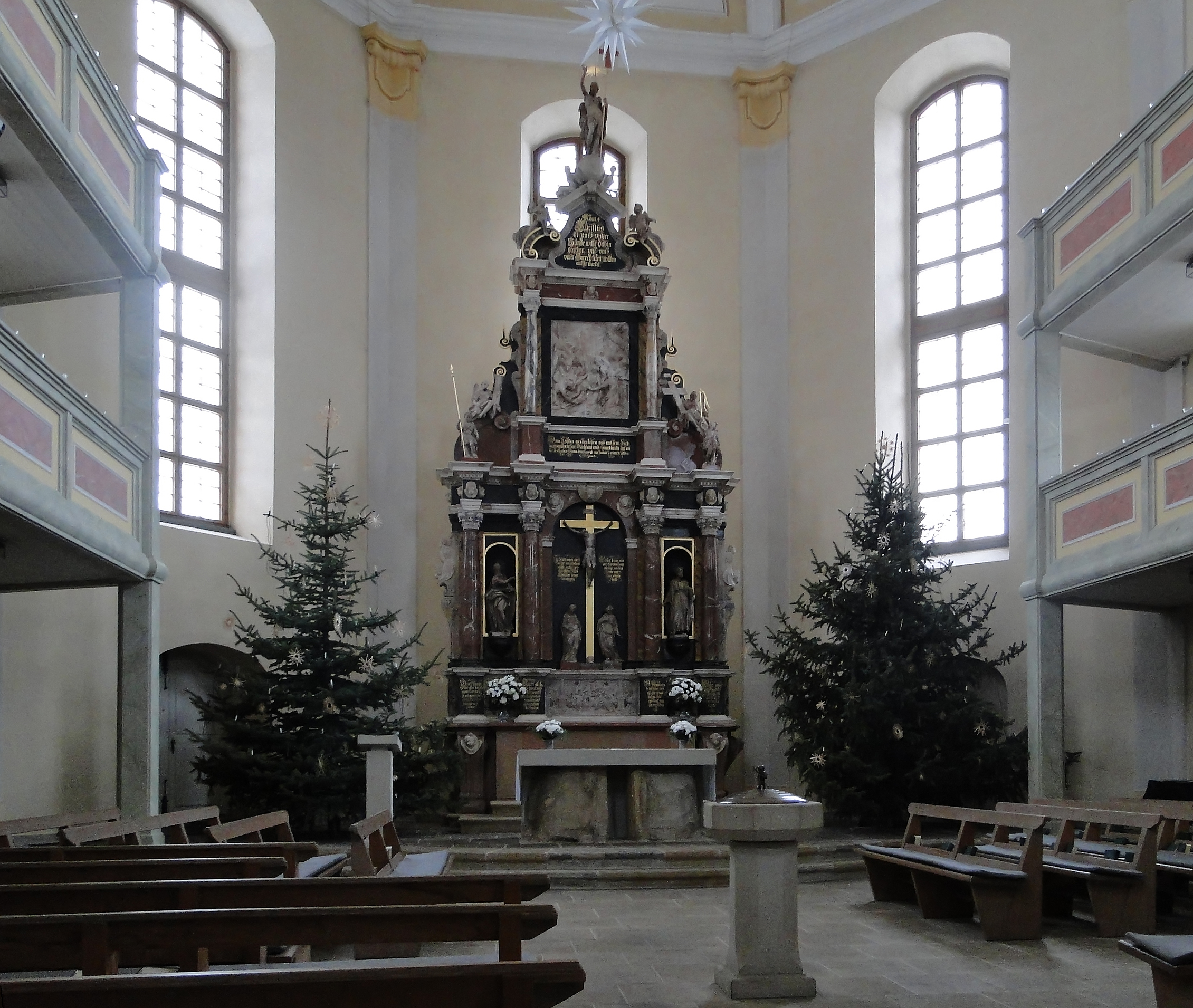
The Nosseni Altar (2010)

The Nosseni Altar is a Renaissance altar crafted by Swiss sculptor Giovanni Maria Nosseni (1544–1620) in the year 1606. This artwork is Nosseni's most significant creation. Originally serving as the main altar of Dresden's Sophienkirche, the altar suffered extensive damage during the bombing of the city in February 1945. Following its restoration in the 1990s, the Nosseni Altar has been housed in the Loschwitz church since 2002.

The altar's construction engaged several Dresden sculptors, and it stands as a notable example of Mannerist art from the Electorate of Saxony around 1600. It reflects the influence of Italian artists while also incorporating elements of local artistic traditions tailored to a 'Nordic taste.' The Nosseni altar has been a protected monument since 1979.

== History ==
=== Foundation by Sophie of Brandenburg ===
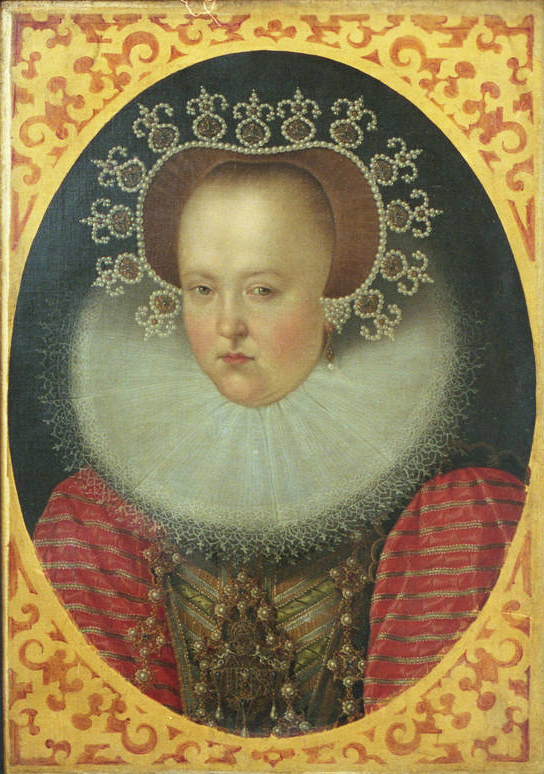
Elector Sophie of Brandenburg donated the altar

The origin of the Nosseni Altar can be traced back to a donation made by Sophie of Brandenburg in the year 1606. Following the passing of her husband, Saxon Elector Christian I, Sophie effectively championed the cause of Lutheranism in Saxony, countering the Calvinist endeavors led by Nikolaus Krell after his early death in 1591. Following her efforts, the former church of the Franciscan monastery adjacent to Dresden Castle underwent a conversion to Protestantism from 1599 to 1602. The newly established Protestant church was named the Sophienkirche in honor of Sophie of Brandenburg upon its completion in 1602.

For the new Sophienkirche, Sophie of Brandenburg donated the altar in 1606, which was erected in 1607 under Giovanni Maria Nosseni in its northern choir. Sculptors involved in its execution were probably the brothers Sebastian Walther and Christoph Walther IV (c. 1572–1626), both of whom were second cousins to the accomplished sculptor Hans Walther. The construction of the altar, which incurred a cost of 3500 florins, utilized various types of stone materials obtained from quarries under the management of Nosseni. The altar does not feature any references to its donor, such as a portrait or a coat of arms. Therefore, the donation is now considered a kind of "testimony of gratitude and faith" of Sophie of Brandenburg.

=== Destruction in 1945 ===
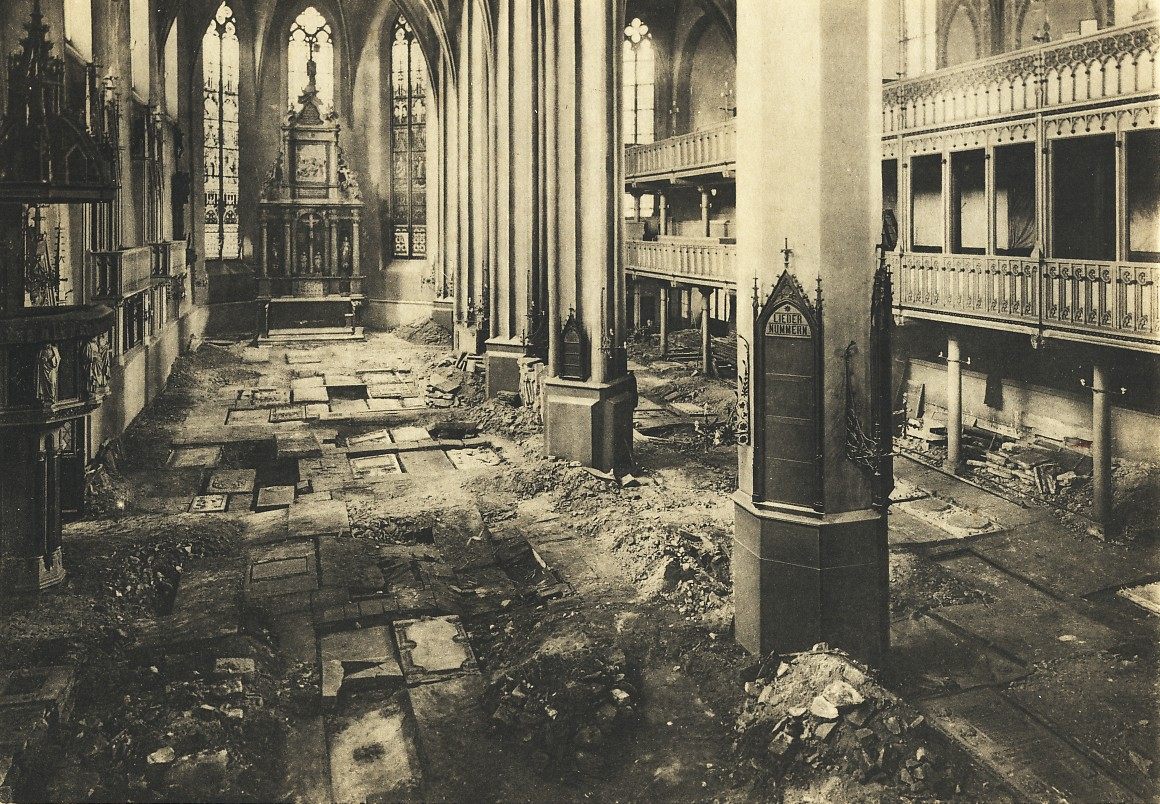
The Nosseni altar at the back left in the Sophienkirche, 1910

Sections of the Sophienkirche altar had already been protected from potential destruction before the air raids on Dresden on February 13, 1945. Thus, the Lamentation relief, along with sculptures representing the Risen Christ, Death, and the Devil, as well as some angels and putti were removed and stored. Additionally, the predella relief was walled up. The bombing caused significant damage to the altar. Before the conclusion of World War II, the initial figural parts of the altar were recovered. Other figurines, such as the five on the main floors, were saved from the rubble before the collapse of the church vault of the Sophienkirche in Dresden in February 1946. The altar structure itself remained in the church ruins. The predella relief portraying the Last Supper remained walled in to protect it from wanton destruction. In December 1945, a survey was undertaken, which later became an important basis for the reconstruction process. In the following year, numerous small angel heads on the altar structure were broken off and stolen.

Some of the recovered figures of the Nosseni altar were stored in rooms of the Dresden Palace and the Kreuzkirche. Other parts and other objects from the Sophienkirche ended up in various churches in Dresden, such as the crucifixion group in the parish room of the Trinitatiskirche and the communion relief in the Thomaskirche.

In 1963, the Sophienkirche underwent demolition. Dedicated preservationists carefully disassembled the Nosseni altar into its constituent elements and placed them in the cellar of the Ständehaus. Due to inadequate storage conditions, this action inadvertently contributed to additional deterioration and loss of parts. Efforts to relocate the altar to the Matthäuskirche in Dresden's Friedrichstadt proved unsuccessful due to the lack of height of the church space. Subsequently, in 1979, the preserved figural parts of the Nosseni altar were included in the central monument list of the GDR.

=== Restoration and reconstruction (1998–2002) ===
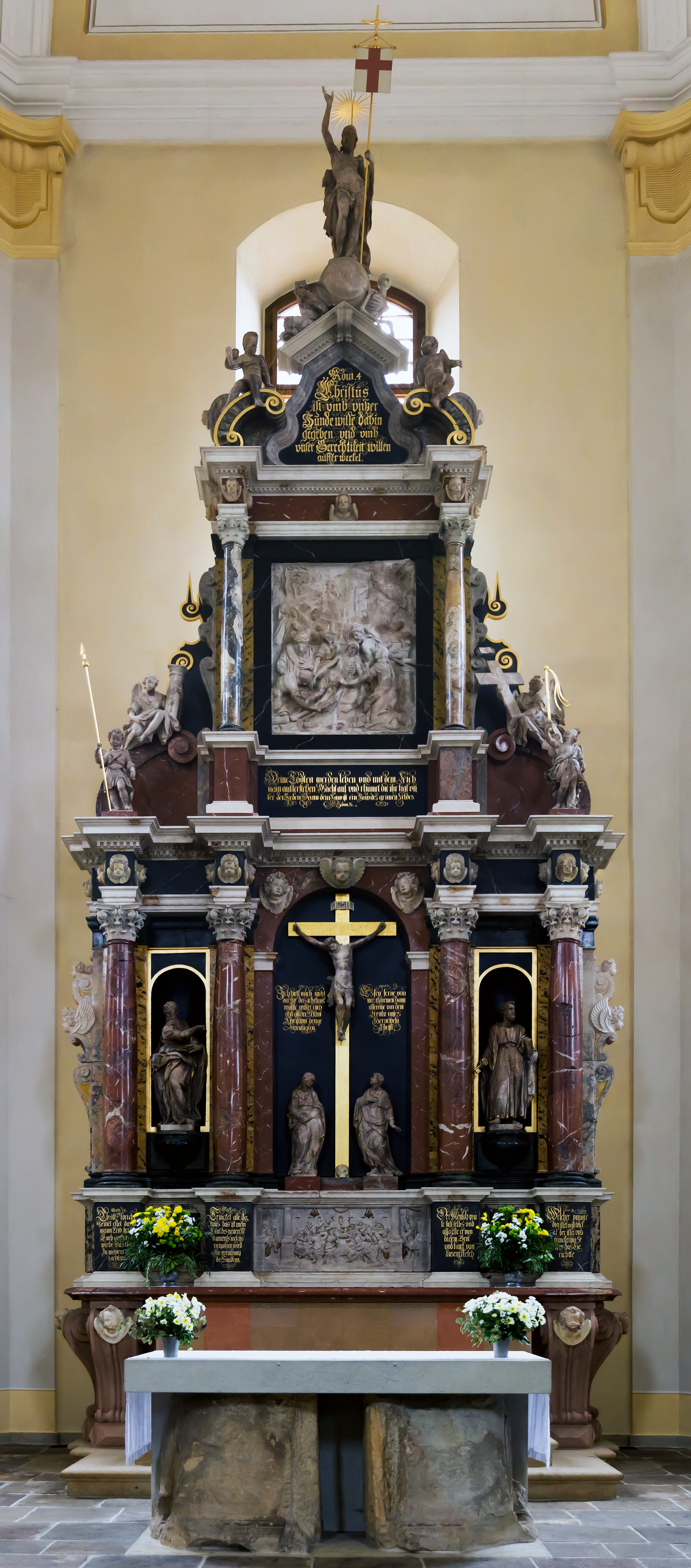
The Nosseni altar in February 2011

On April 1, 1993, the Loschwitz parish formally requested permission from the regional church office to transfer the Nosseni altar to the Loschwitz church. This baroque church, built in 1705–1708 by Johann Christian Fehre and George Bähr, underwent reconstruction from 1991 to 1994 after its extensive damage during the bombing of Dresden in 1945. However, the restoration of the original baroque pulpit altar was not feasible. Given the suitable spatial conditions within the Loschwitz church for accommodating the Nosseni altar, preliminary discussions concerning its restoration and reconstruction commenced in 1996. During this period, the altar, crafted from alabaster, marble, and sandstone, was dispersed across multiple locations in Dresden, consisting of over 350 individual components. The declared goal was to incorporate all preserved parts into the restored altar. Various potential approaches were considered, including anastilosis and the incorporation of "old" components into a contemporary altarpiece design.

After deciding on a largely original reconstruction using all of the approximately 350 surviving figurative parts and fragments, the works began in 1998. Static problems made it necessary to reinforce the altar structure with a steel framework inside before ornaments and figures could be installed. The sculptor's workshop of Christian Schulze and the art molding workshop of Manfred Zehrfeld crafted the missing parts of the altar in a form true to the original. However, the restoration of sculptural details utilizing diverse colored marble and green serpentine presented challenges, resulting in the use of stucco marble for these elements. This stucco marble was adjusted in color and texture to harmonize with the original components. This approach allowed the altar's aesthetic coherence to be preserved, with any distinctions between the original and the additions only becoming evident upon close examination. Furthermore, if the material itself had caused the additions, it would have led to unavoidable loss of the original material because uneven fractures would need to be smoothed to connect the reconstructed parts. The figures and capitals that were damaged, initially crafted from alabaster sourced from the southern Harz region, were supplemented with tinted white alabaster from Italy. This choice ensured that distinctions between the preserved and newly created sections remained visible, maintaining historical authenticity throughout the restoration process.

On October 6, 2002, a solemn consecration ceremony marked the unveiling of the approximately eleven-meter-high Nosseni altar within the Loschwitz church.

== Descriptio ==
The Renaissance altar is characterized by its three-tiered structure, comprising a lower, middle, and upper section. This architectural arrangement was a prevailing motif among sculptors of the Electorate of Saxony during the early 17th century.

=== Lower altar structure ===
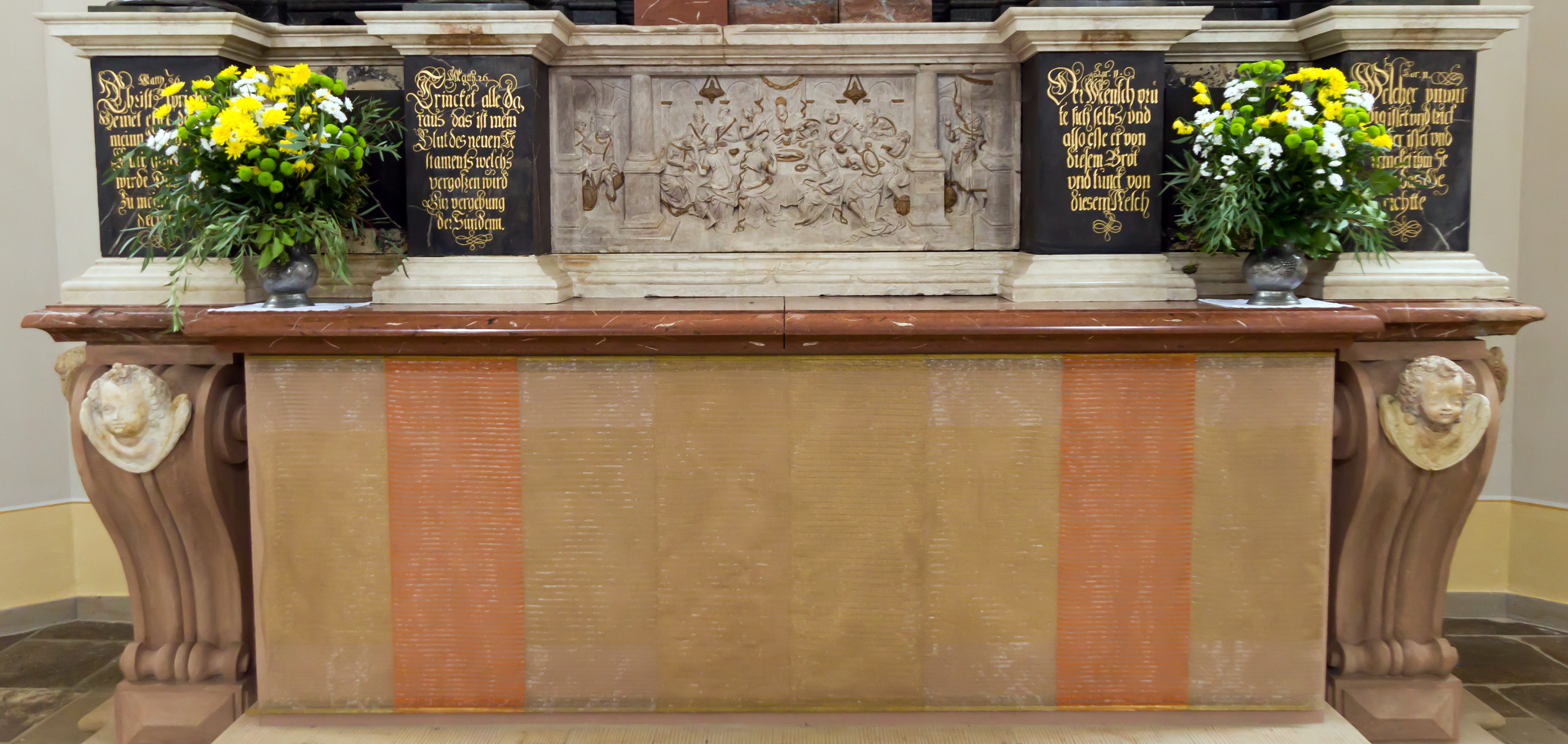
The lower altar structure of the Nosseni altar

The lower superstructure with four postaments above the altar table has biblical passages in gold letters on black marble. The outer left postament reads: Matth. 26. "Christ says: Nemet, esset, das ist mein Leib, der für Euch gegebent wird. Do this in remembrance of me." While on the inner left postament, the following Bible verse is quoted: Matth. 26. "Drink of it, all of you, this is my blood of the new testament which is poured out for the forgiveness of sins," the inner right postament shows the Bible verse: Cor. 11. "Let a man examine himself, and so let him eat of this bread and drink of this cup." The outer right postament quotes the saying: Cor. 11. "Whosoever eateth and trifitteth unworthily eateth and drinketh judgment to himself."

Between the inner postaments is an alabaster relief as a predella, which shows the Last Supper scene: "John bows before Christ, while the apostles appear lively and moved in conversation. The painterly perspective is reminiscent of works by Giovanni da Bologna," according to art historian Cornelius Gurlitt. Heinrich Magirius interpreted the second disciple from the left at the communion table as the theologian Polycarp Leyser, as well as the men carrying wine jugs on the left edge as the sculptor Walther.

=== Central altar structure ===
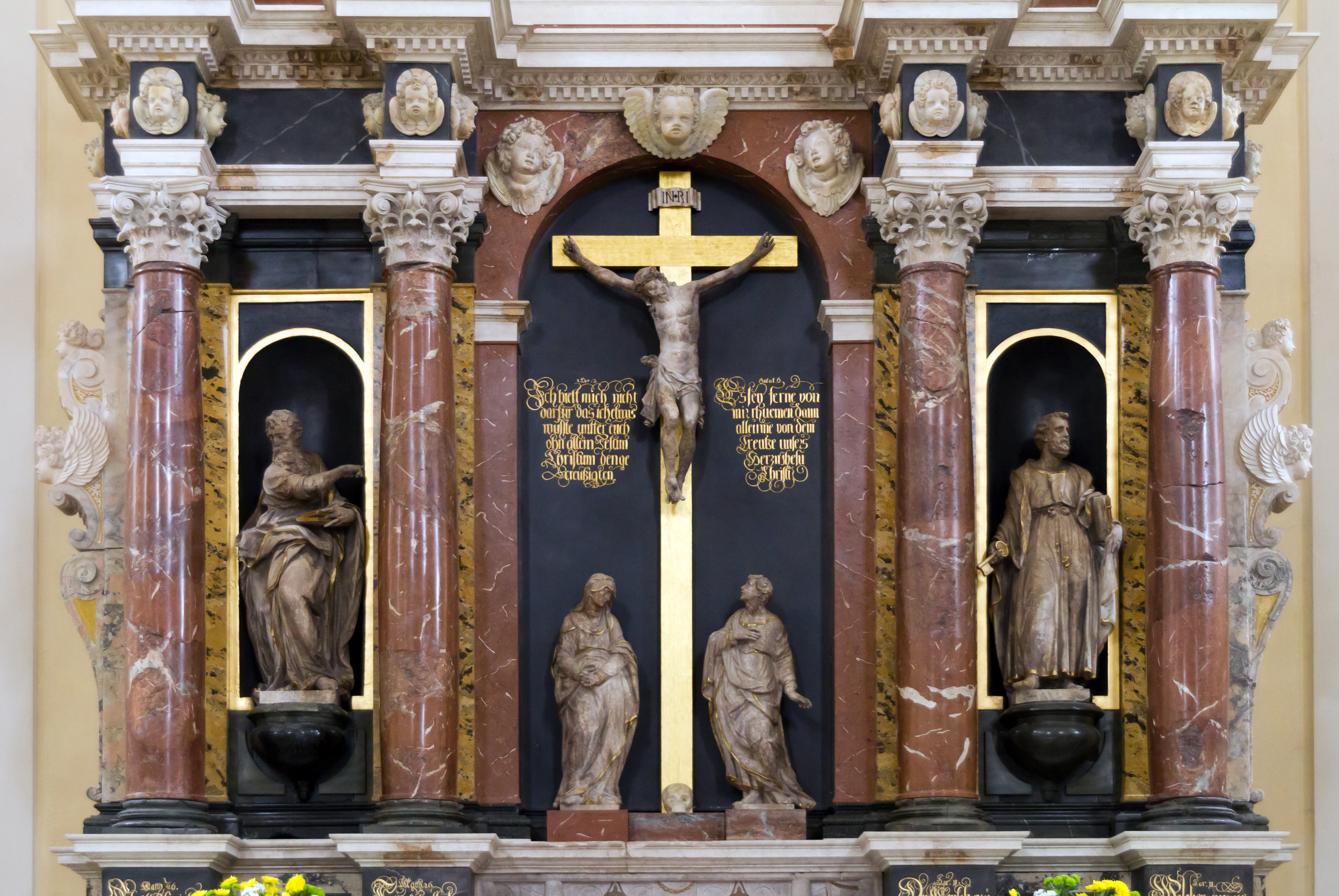
Middle part of the altar

The central part of the altar is characterized by four Corinthian columns with cranked entablature, which stand on the pedestals of the lower superstructure. Between the inner columns in the central field of the altar, the crucifixion scene is depicted on the main floor in an incisive arch, the upper curve of which extends into the frieze zone. Below the cross with the figure of Christ is a statue of John 85 cm high on the right and one of Mary of the same height on the left.

Above the figures are Bible verses in gold letters. Above the figure of Mary is written: 1 Cor. 2. "I did not think that I knew anything among you except Jesus Christ the crucified", while above the figure of John the following Bible verse can be read: Galat. 6 "Far be it from me to be crucified, but far be it from the cross of our Lord Jesus Christ."

In the two niches between the inner and outer columns stands on the right the figure of Peter, about one meter high, with a key in one hand. In the other, he carries a closed book. In the left niche is a statue of Paul of the same height with a book and a sword hidden in his robe.

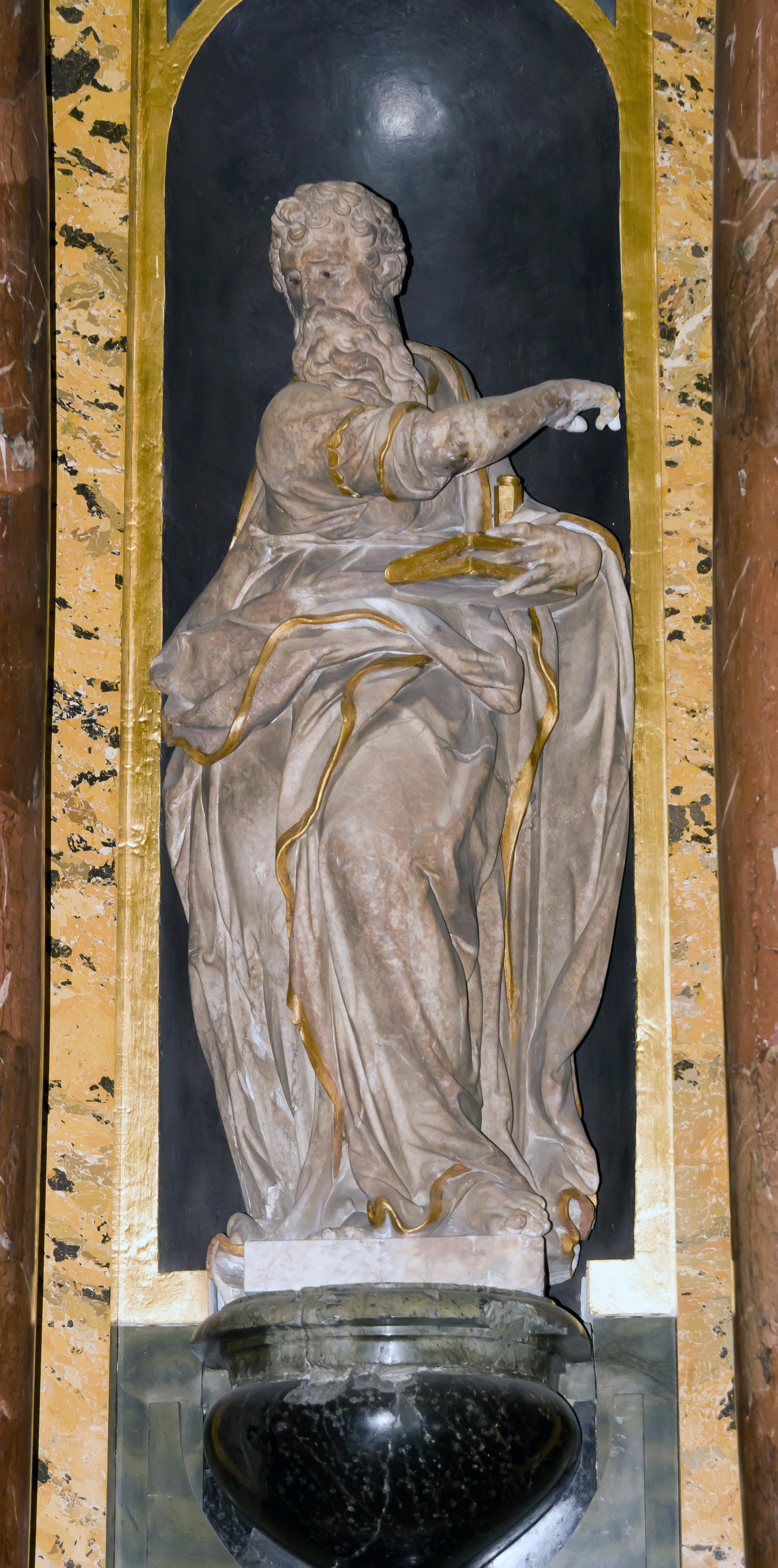
Middle altar structure, left: figure of Paul

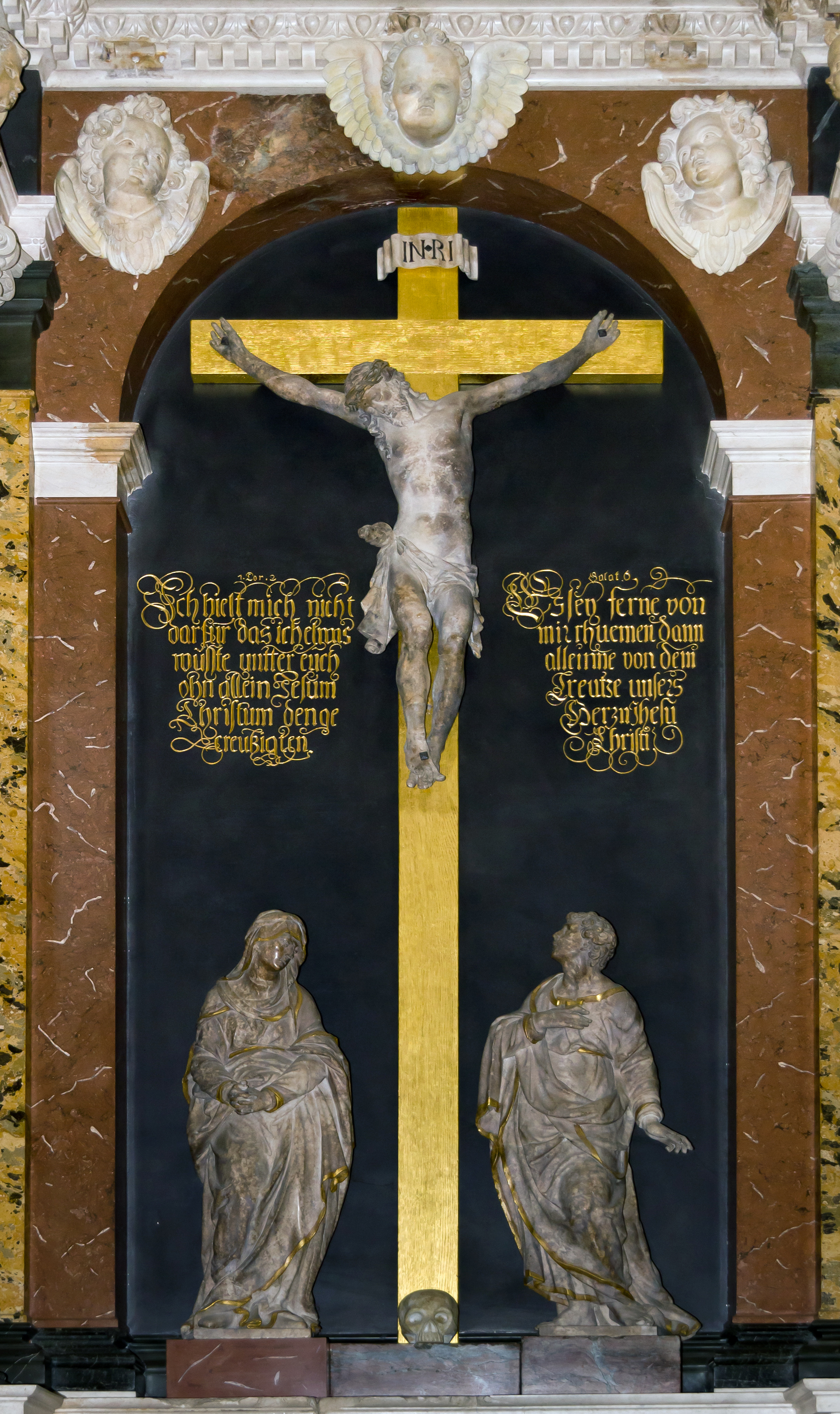
Central altar structure, centre: Crucifixion group

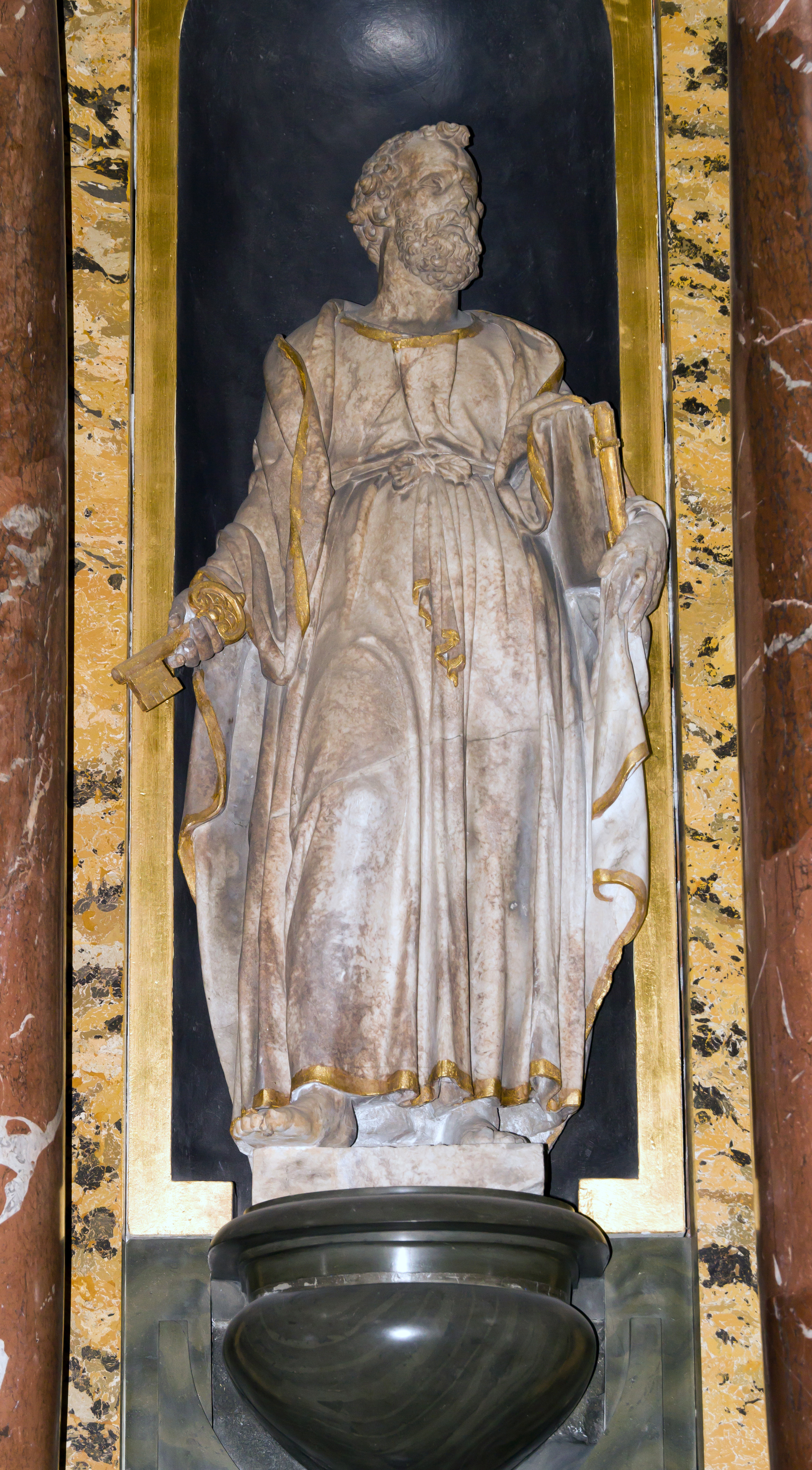
Central altar structure, right: Peter figure

=== Upper altar structure ===
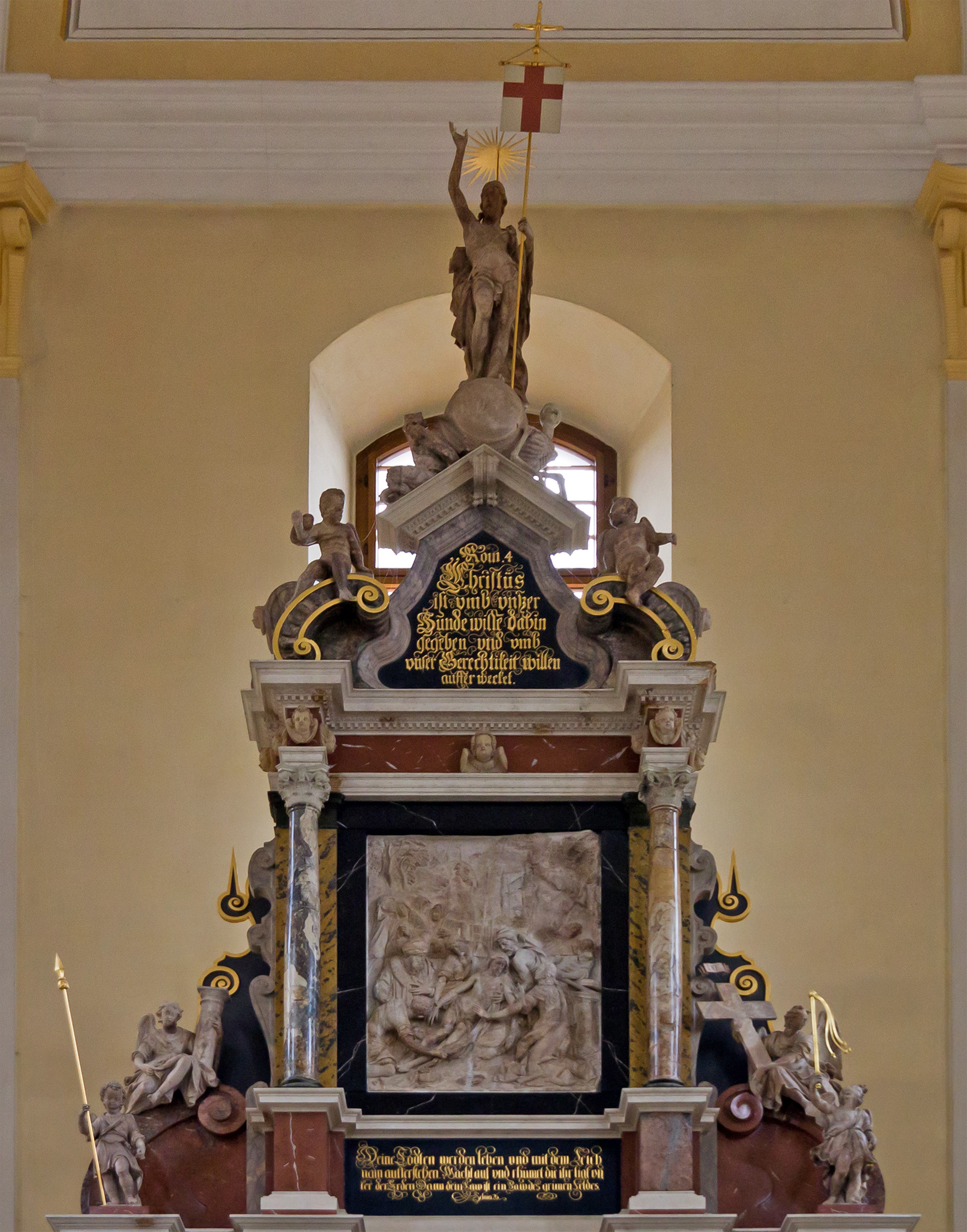
Upper altar structure

Above the crucifixion group, the tapered upper altar structure is attached. In the attic zone, two pedestals enclose the parapet with an inscription from the Bible: "Your dead shall live and rise with the body. Awake and rejoice, ye that lie under the earth, then thy taw is a taw of the green field. Isaiah 26."

Between the two adjoining Ionic columns, which continue the inner Corinthian columns of the central panel, a relief depicting the Lamentation of Christ. It portrays Christ, held by apostles by the feet and upper body, slumped over, with Mary kneeling at his left side. Other women and apostles are in the background, and a landscape can be seen in the distance. Surrounding the superstructure are angels holding a lance, a cross, and a scourging column. The superstructure is crowned by a Baroque ornamental gable, whose tympanum is adorned with a biblical verse from Romans 4:25: "Christ is given for our sins, and raised for our riches."

The finale is the resurrected Christ with the flag of faith on a globe, against which death and the devil are leaning.

== Working sculptors ==
Robert Bruck pointed out in 1912 that Nosseni was not himself creative in his "sculptural commissions, but commissioned other artists or assistants in his workshop to execute his designs." It is believed that Nosseni served most likely as only "the intellectual originator" of the altar and assigned the actual execution to his workshop assistants. Bruck thought that he could recognize the distinct style of various sculptors in elements such as the relief depicting the Lamentation of Christ, the Last Supper relief, the figure of Christ on the globe, and the ornamental intricacies. While smaller ornaments might have been the work of workshop assistants, the more substantial artistic components of the altar are attributed to contemporary sculptors.

=== Last Supper relief ===
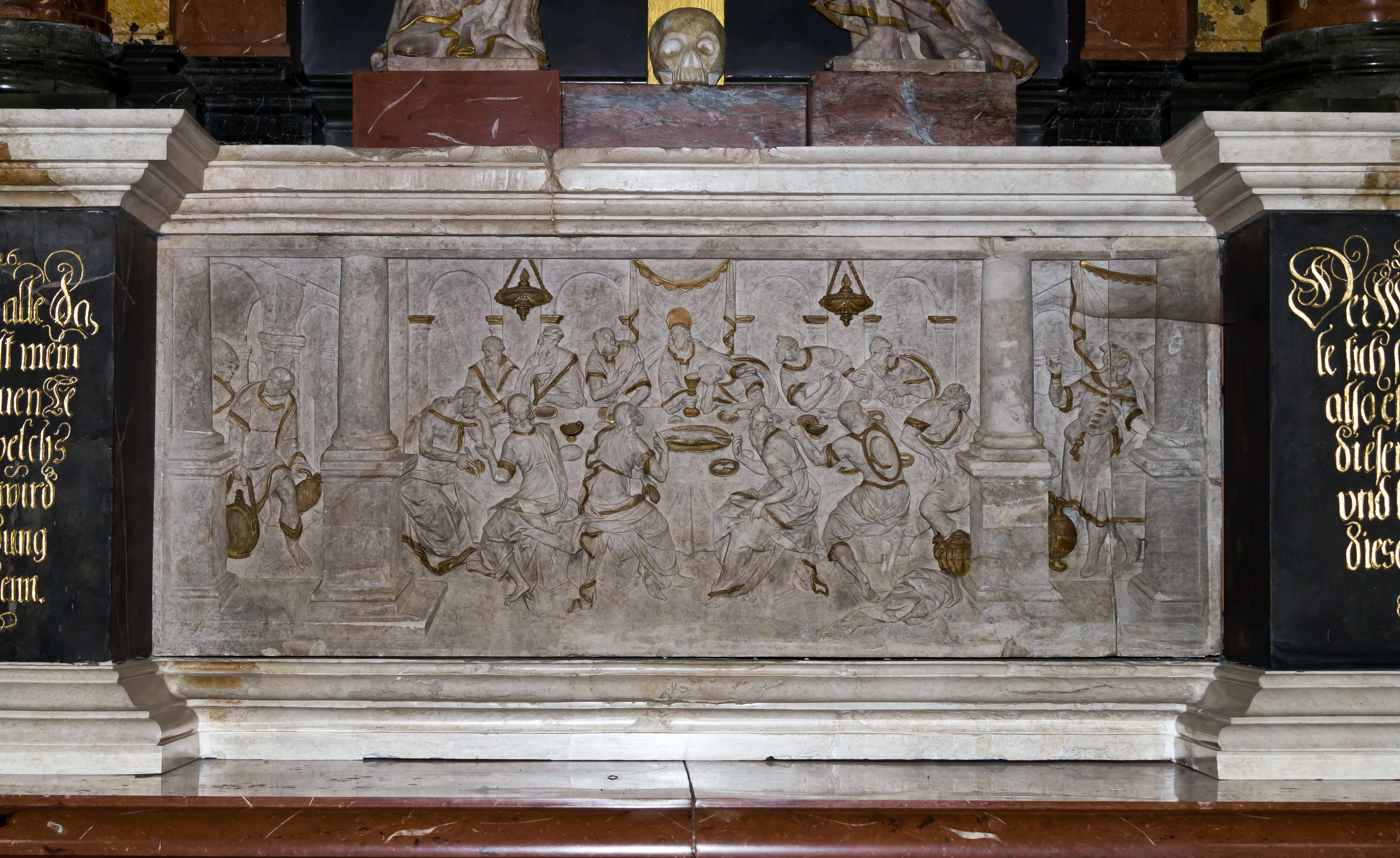
Last Supper relief

In its composition, the Last Supper relief differs significantly from the conventional portrayals of the Last Supper in German art Jesus, distinguished by a halo, is depicted seated at a table alongside his disciples within a portico. The arches of the hall provide a view of background elements such as pyramids, a domed structure, and other buildings. Servants positioned on the left side of the relief are shown offering wine and are dressed in secular attire. In contrast to Christ and the disciples, they are dressed differently. Towards the right edge of the relief stands a cellar master adorned with keys on his belt. Bruck identifies a distinct reference to Paolo Veronese's Guest Supper in the House of Levi and therefore assigns the relief to an Italian artist. Conversely, other scholars attribute both the design and the execution of the relief to Nosseni, which would illustrate his artistic style. However, since no other relief by Nosseni's hand exists, Bruck attributes only the design to Nosseni and suggests the possibility that an unknown workshop assistant executed the relief under Nosseni's direction. The relief is accredited as a work of Nosseni.

Heinrich Magirius identifies stylistic similarities between the Last Supper relief and the Cranach epitaph in Wittenberg, which is signed S. W. F. and attributed to Sebastian Walther. Therefore, he attributes the Last Supper relief to Sebastian Walther.

=== Relief of the Lamentation of Christ ===
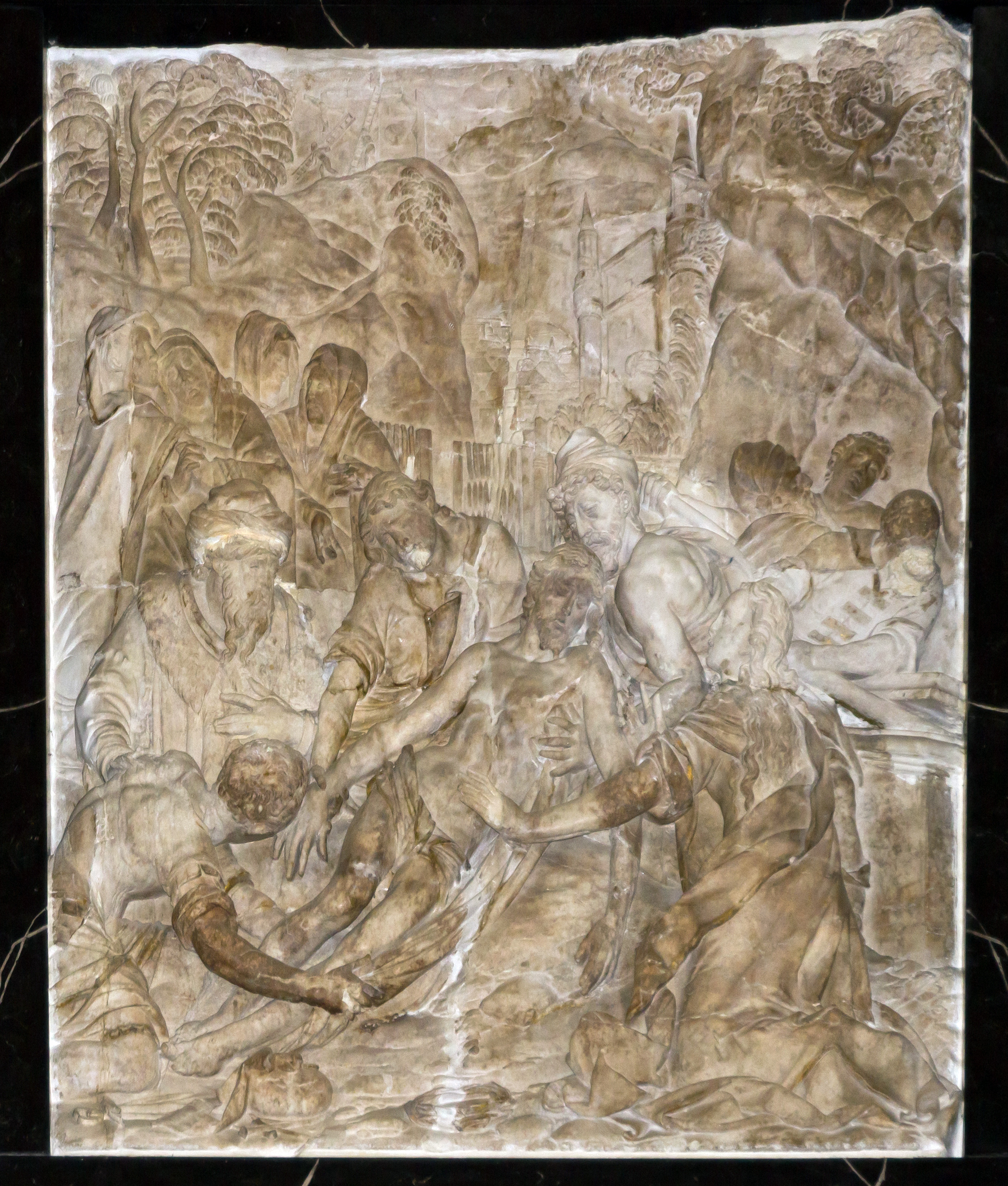
Relief of the Lamentation of Christ

Bruck attributes a prominent role to Sebastian Walther (1576-1645), considering him the most notable assistant within Nosseni's workshop. This suggests that Sebastian Walther likely played a substantial role in executing significant portions of the altar. Since hardly any works by Sebastian Walther have survived, Bruck examined the so-called Nosseni epitaph from 1616. By comparing styles, he assigns the Ecce homo of the epitaph to Hegewald and the lateral alabaster reliefs to Sebastian Walther. The reliefs of the epitaph, in turn, show clear similarities with the relief of the Lamentation of Christ on the altar, particularly in the drapery of the clothes, postures, and facial expressions, so that Bruck assigns the relief of the Lamentation of Christ to Sebastian Walther.

Heinrich Magirius sees clear differences between the Last Supper relief and the portrayal of the Lamentation of Christ. As both Sebastian Walther and his brother Christoph Walther IV are associated with the Nosseni altar, Magirius suspects the work characterized by its somewhat anxious “academic dryness" to be the work of either Christoph Walther IV or his brother Michael Walther (1574-1624). Nonetheless, no attributed works by Michael Walther exist that would allow stylistic comparisons.

=== Christ on the globe ===
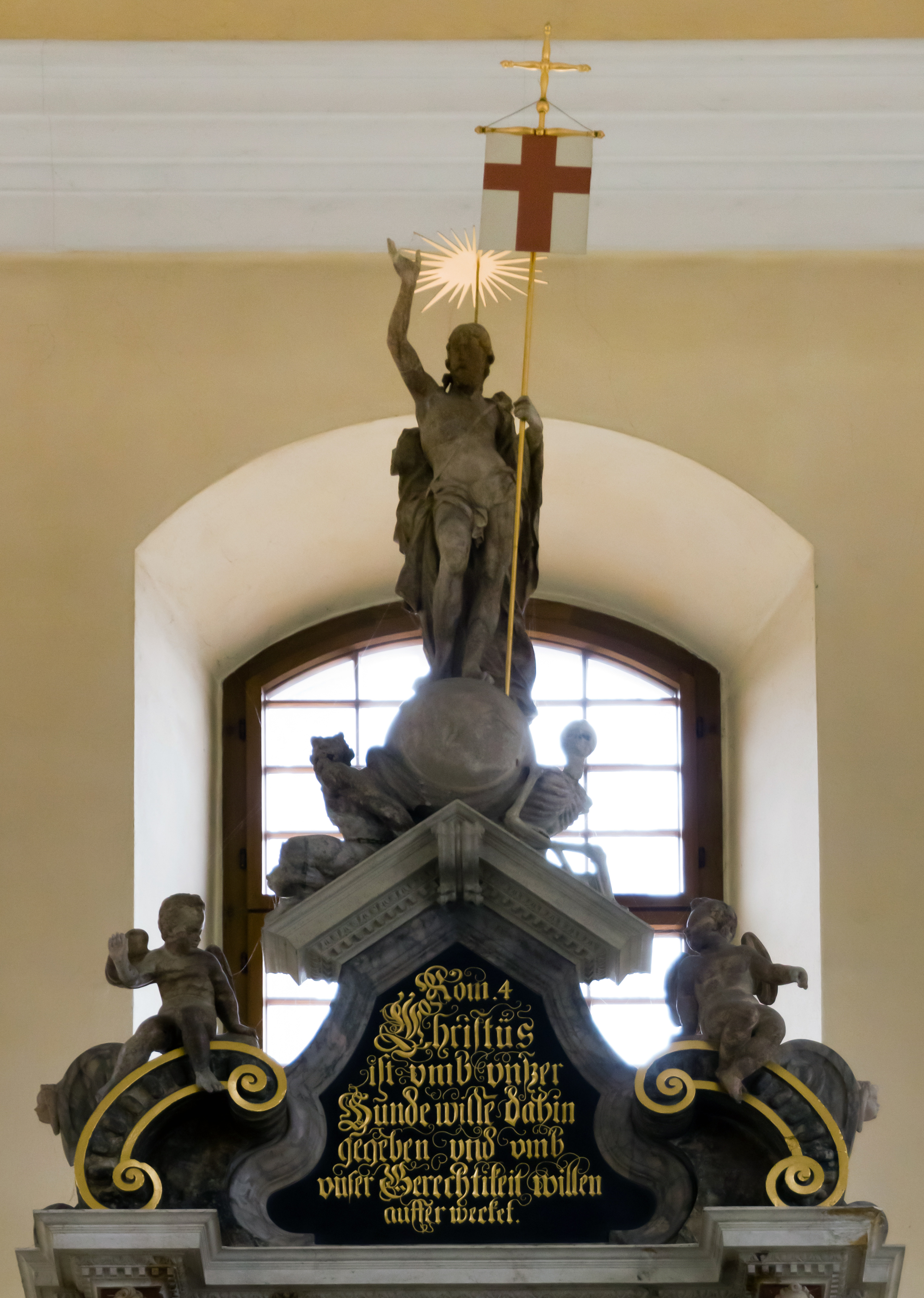
Christ on the globe

In the figure of Christ on the globe, Robert Bruck believes to recognize Zacharias Hegewald's style and manner based on the resemblances to the Ecce homo depiction on the Nosseni epitaph. These similarities manifest in details such as the treatment of hair and beard, characterized by lively, curly strands, as well as the specific orientation of the upper parts of the eye sockets about the base of the nose, and the notably slender upper eyelids. The Ecce Homo on the Nosseni epitaph exemplifies the style of Zacharias Hegewald.

The small figure of Death leaning against the globe features the artist's signature C W F. This indicates an authorship by Christoph Walther IV. The signature D. M. H. 1607 on the globe could not be assigned to an artist so far. It is plausible that this signature belongs to an anonymous assistant or artist of lesser prominence.

== Style and rating ==
Cornelius Gurlitt highlighted the Italian style of the altar, showing the clear influence of the schools of Jacopo Sansovino or Giovanni da Bologna in the figure's structure. Fritz Löffler characterized the altar as a "major work of Mannerism ... from the school of Giovanni da Bologna." He noted that the three-tiered altar structure aligned with the typical style of sculptors from Electoral Saxony around 1600. Hentschel therefore qualified that the construction "could have been called Italian, had not the consideration for the high Gothic choir of the Sophienkirche. This led to a stretching of the proportions and excessive tapering towards the top." The volute transitions between the main and upper floors were adapted to "Nordic taste," while the overall construction and figural work remained rooted in Italian traditions. The "narrowness and restrictedness of the space" for the figures reflected an adaptation to "'Nordic' customs". Although the expression is not an outstandingly deepened one, the altar testifies to a beauty of form that already distinguished Nosseni in the design of the Freiberg princely tomb. Heinrich Magirius summarized the altar's art-historical and stylistic significance in 2004, observing:

"From an art historical point of view, the altar bears witness to the continued dominance of Italian culture at the Dresden court since the mid-16th century, in this case clearly of Venetian provenance, but at the same time its assimilation of domestic traditions."

— Heinrich Magirius 2004
