= Timeline of Dresden =

Coordinates: 51.033333°N 13.733333°E

Timeline of Dresden
Historical affiliations

Margravate of Meissen, 1206–1316
Margraviate of Brandenburg 1316–1319
Margravate of Meissen, 1319–1423
Electorate of Saxony, 1423–1485
Duchy of Saxony, 1485–1547
Electorate of Saxony, 1547–1806
Kingdom of Saxony, 1806–1848
German Empire, 1848–1849
Kingdom of Saxony, 1849–1918
North German Confederation (Kingdom of Saxony), 1867–1871
German Empire (Kingdom of Saxony), 1867–1918
Weimar Republic (Free State of Saxony), 1918–1933
Nazi Germany, 1933–1945
Soviet occupation zone of Germany, 1945–1949
East Germany, 1949–1990
Germany (Free State of Saxony), 1990–present

The following is a timeline of the history of the city of Dresden, the capital of the German state of Saxony.

== Prior to 18th century ==
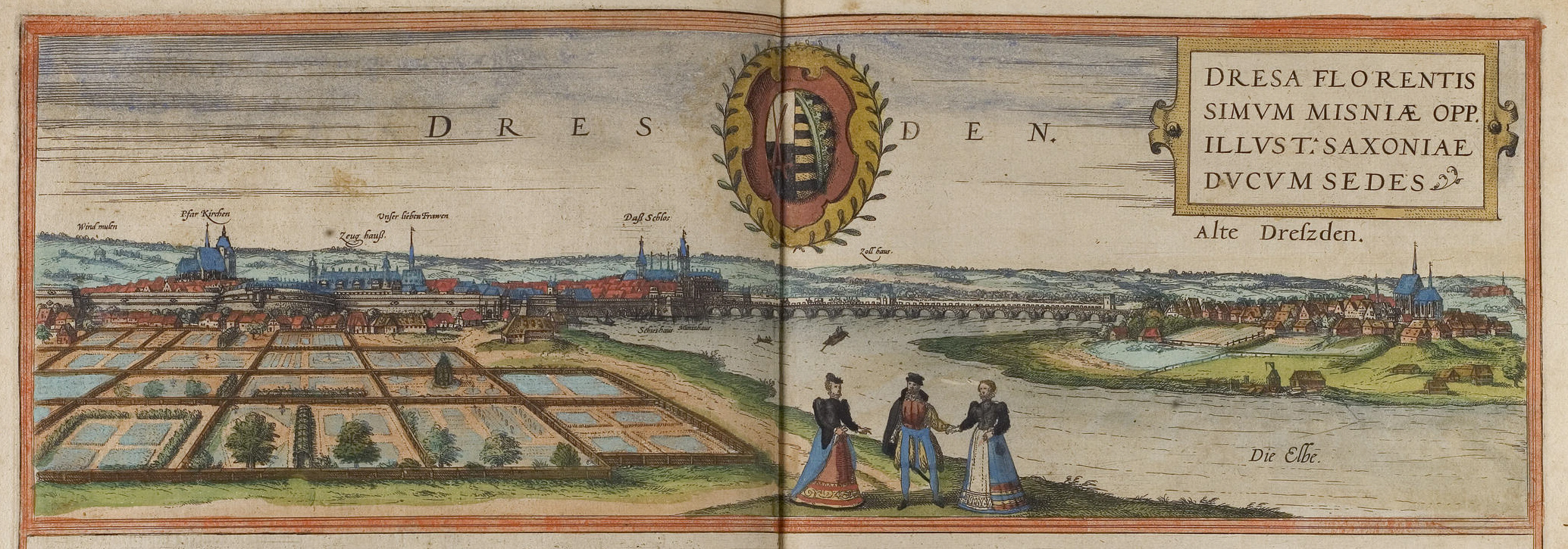
Dresden, 16th century

- 1206 – First documentation of "Dresdene".
- 1215 – Nikolaikirche founded.
- 1272 – Franziskanerkloster founded.
- 1309 – City seal incorporates coat of arms of Dresden.
- 1350 – First documentation of Altendresden (today Innere Neustadt) at the northern side of the Elbe.
- 1351 – Sophienkirche built.
- 1388 – Kreuzkirche consecrated.
- 1400 – Busmannkapelle built.
- 1409 – Armory established.
- 1434 – Striezelmarkt occurring.
- 1524 – Printing press in operation.
- 1530 – City expands.
- 1548 – Orchestra founded.
- 1563 – Dresdner Zeughaus built.
- 1589 – Johanneum built.
- 1666 – Premiere of Schütz's St Matthew Passion.
- 1667 – Opera house opens.
- 1678 – "Elector of Saxony's Players" dramatic troupe^{(de)} headquartered in Dresden (approximate date).
- 1695 – Parade of Frederick Augustus I.
- 1697 – Population: 40,000 (approximate).
- 1700 – Von Tschirnhaus glassworks set up.

== 18th century ==
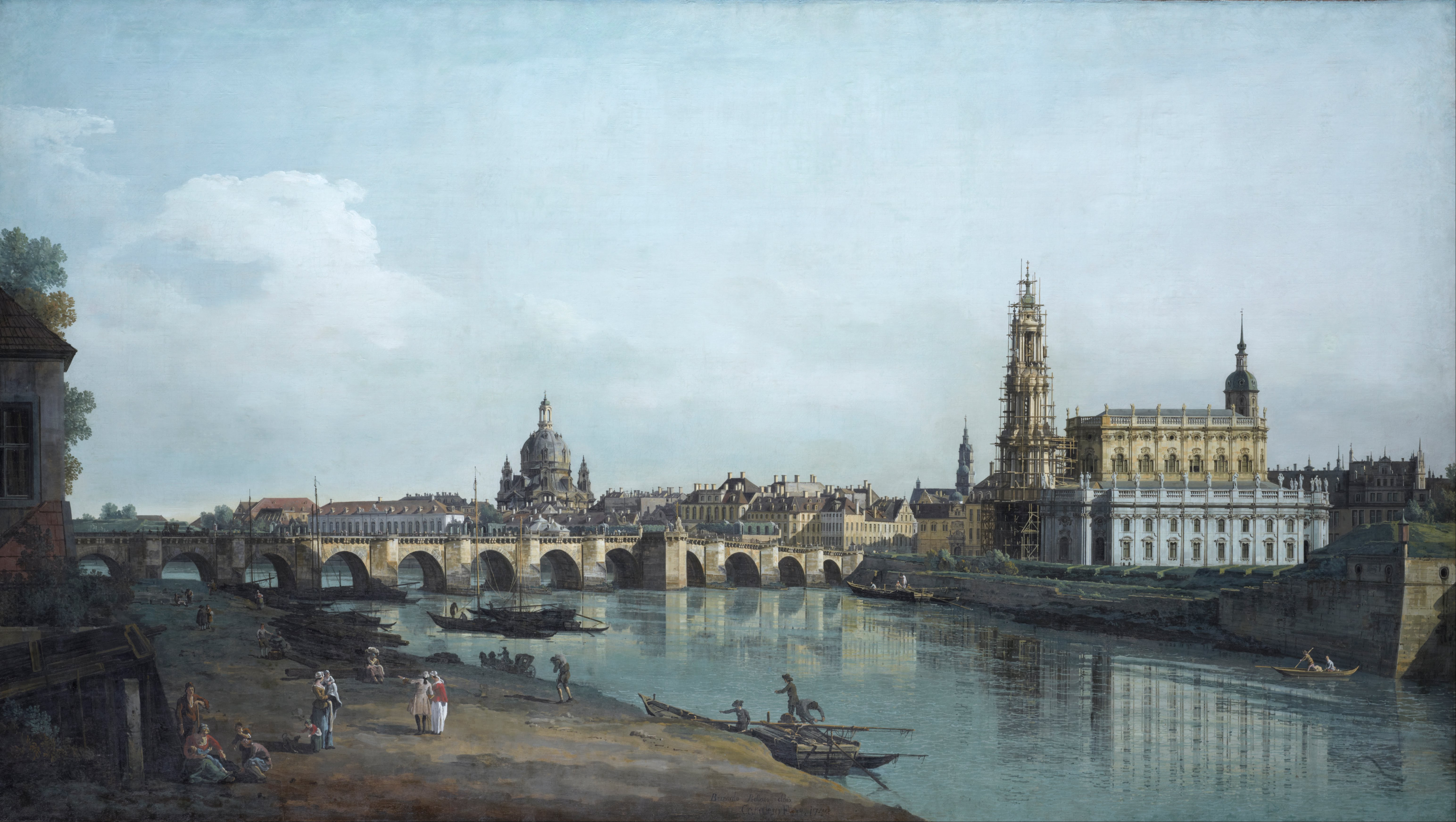
Dresden by Bernardo Bellotto, 1748

- 1704 – Palais Flemming-Sulkowski built.
- 1708 – Porcelain developed by Johann Friedrich Böttger.
- 1710 – Meissen porcelain manufactory begins operating near city.
- 1717 – Japanisches Palais built.
- 1718 – Royal Palace rebuilt.
- 1719 – Wedding reception of Polish Prince Frederick Augustus and Maria Josepha of Austria.
- 1720 – Catholic Cemetery opens by decree of King Augustus II the Strong.
- 1722
  - Zwinger built.
  - Picture Gallery founded.
- 1723
  - Grünes Gewölbe founded.
  - Pillnitz Castle built.
- 1724 – Royal Cabinet of Mathematical and Physical Instruments established.
- 1726 – Übigau Palace completed.
- 1729 – Wackerbarth-Palais built.
- 1733 – Villages of Gorbitz and Übigau (present-day districts) granted to Aleksander Józef Sułkowski by Augustus III of Poland.
- 1736 – Equestrian sculpture of Polish King August the Strong unveiled.
- 1743 – Frauenkirche built.
- 1745 – City "taken by the Russians."
- 1748 – Collegium Medico Chirurgicum established.
- 1755 – Population: 63,000 (approximate).
- 1756 – Catholic Church of the Royal Court built.
- 1759 – September: "Dresden liberated from Prussians."
- 1760 – July: Siege of Dresden.
- 1763 – Death and burial of King Augustus III of Poland at the Catholic Church of the Royal Court.
- 1764 – Dresden Art Academy founded.
- 1776 – Landhaus built.
- 1784 – Observatory established.
- 1788 – Saxon Library opens.
- 1793 – Tadeusz Kościuszko begins preparations for the Kościuszko Uprising in the city in response to the Second Partition of Poland.

== 19th century ==
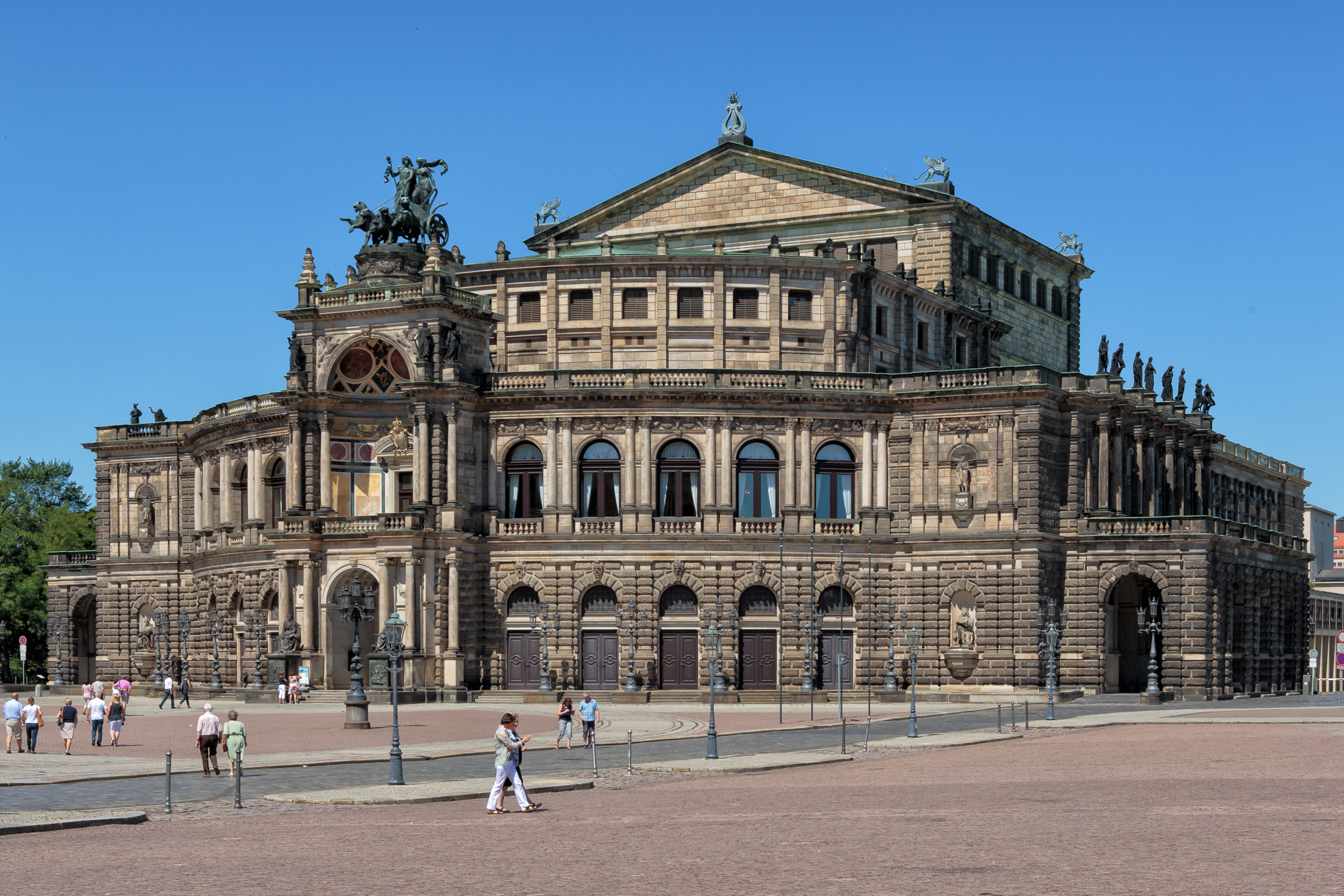
The Semperoper opera house opened in its current form in 1878

- 1807 – Constitution of the Duchy of Warsaw promulgated.
- 1809 – Austrians in power.
- 1813 – 26–27 August: Battle of Dresden.
- 1814 – Großer Garten opens to the public.
- 1818 – Ernst Arnold gallery established.
- 1823 – Jordan & Timaeus chocolate manufactury established.
- 1828 – Saxon Technical School founded.
- 1831 – Many Polish insurgents of the November Uprising fled from the Russian Partition of Poland to the city.
- 1833 – Isis Society (natural history) founded.
- 1835 – Polish composer Fryderyk Chopin met his future fiancée Maria Wodzinska in the city.
- 1838 – Dresden Coinage Convention held in city.
- 1839 – Leipzig–Dresden railway begins operating.
- 1841 – Opera house built.
- 1843 – Jam factory begins operating.
- 1845 – Flood.
- 1845 – 19 October: Premiere of Wagner's opera Tannhäuser.
- 1849 – May Uprising in Dresden.
- 1852
  - Marien Brucke (bridge) constructed.
  - Population: 100,000.
- 1854 – Semper Gallery and Schloss Albrechtsberg built.
- 1855 – September: Royal Gallery opens.
- 1856 – Dresden Conservatory established.
- 1858 – Population: 128,152.
- 1861 – Dresden Zoo opens.
- 1866 – Prussians in power.
- 1870 – Gewerbehausorchester founded.
- 1871 – Military facility built in Albertstadt.
- 1874 – Dresden English Football Club confirmed.
- 1875 – Dresden Museum of Ethnology founded.
- 1876 – Fürstenzug created.
- 1878 – Opera house rebuilt.
- 1889
  - Albertinum built.
  - Dresden Botanical Garden created.
- 1891 – Dresden City Museum founded.
- 1893 – Blue Wonder bridge constructed.
- 1895 – Dresden Funicular Railway begins operating.
- 1897 – Dresden Central Station built.
- 1898
  - Ernemann-Werke camera factory in operation.
  - Dresdner SC football club formed.

== 20th century ==
=== 1900-1945 ===
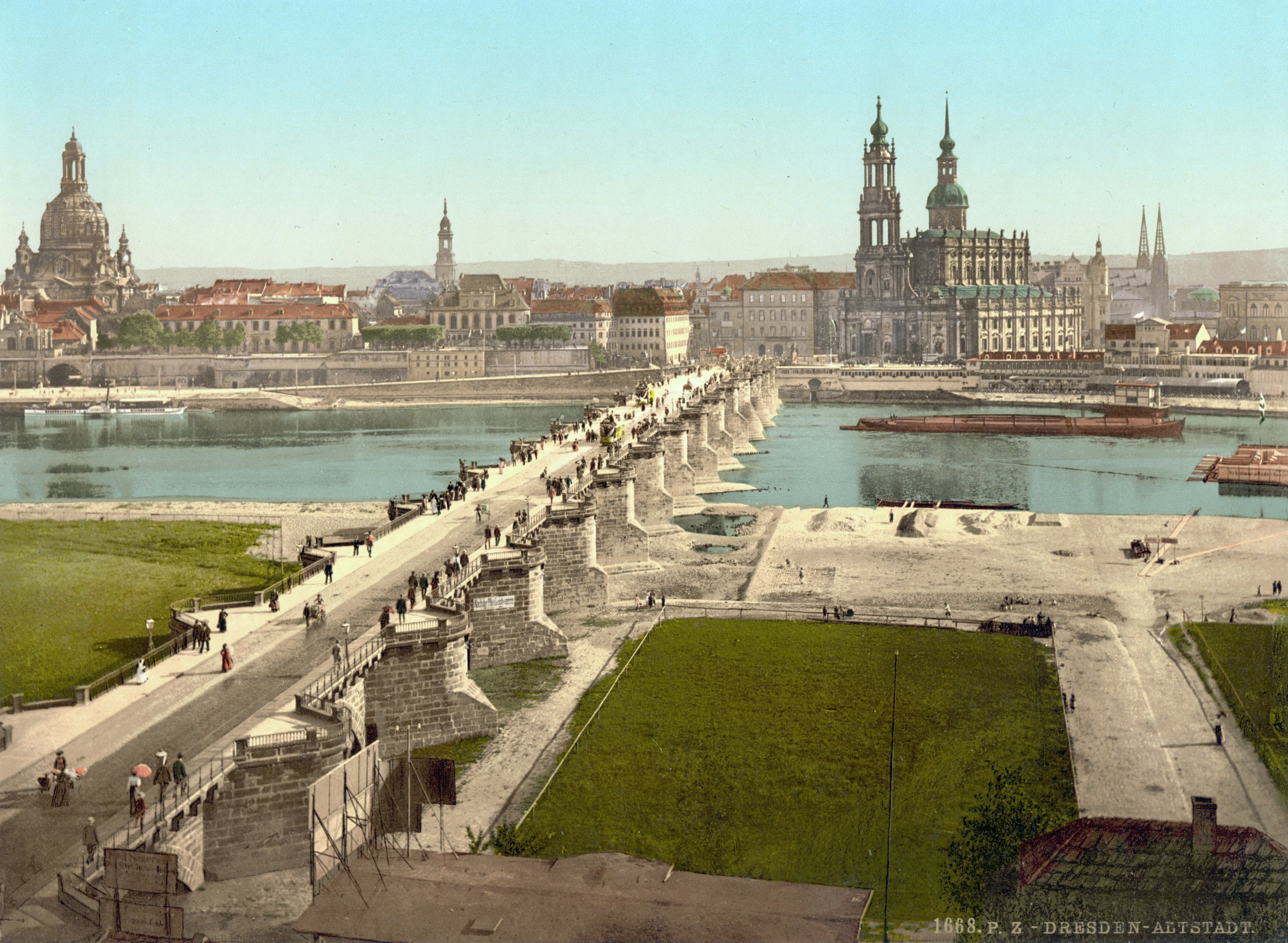
Dresden approximately in 1900

- 1901
  - Dresden-Neustadt station opens.
  - Schwebebahn Dresden begins operating.
- 1903
  - German City Exhibit held.
  - Simmel delivers The Metropolis and Mental Life lecture.
- 1904 – Ministry building constructed.
- 1905 – 9 December: Premiere of Strauss' opera Salome.
- 1910
  - Städtische Zentralbibliothek, Dresden (city library) formed.
  - Augustus Bridge constructed.
- 1911
  - Dresden Museums Association formed.
  - Premiere of Strauss' opera Der Rosenkavalier.
- 1912 – Ihagee camera company and German Hygiene Museum founded.
- 1914 – Saxon army museum established.
- 1919
  - Stadion am Ostragehege des Dresdner SC opens.
  - Population: 529,326.
- 1923 – Glücksgas Stadium built.
- 1932 – Polish-language church services cancelled.
- 1933 – Population: 649,252.
- 1935 – Dresden-Klotzsche Airport opens.

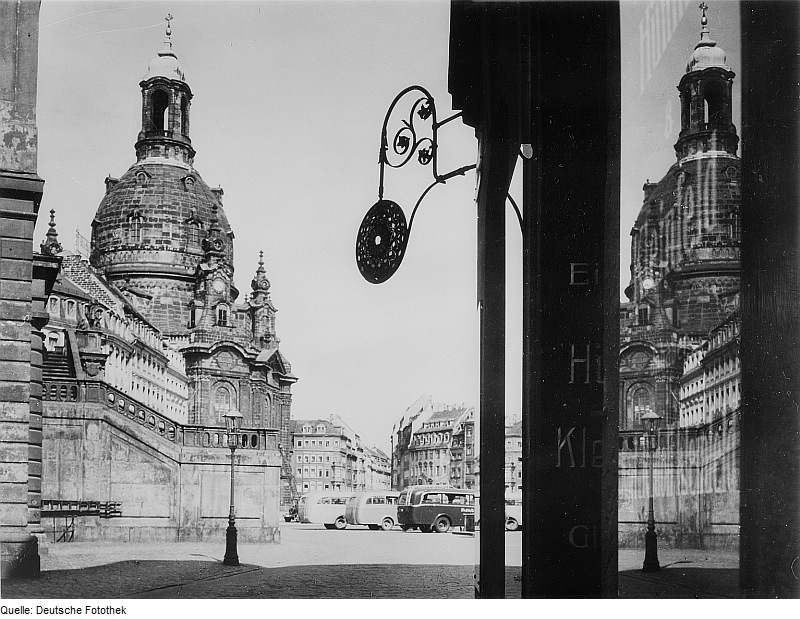
New Market Square in 1939

- 1939
  - September: Mass arrests of local Polish activists (see also Nazi crimes against the Polish nation).
  - Population: 625,174.
- 1940 – Hans Nieland becomes mayor.
- 1942
  - June: Subcamp of the Flossenbürg concentration camp founded at the SS Engineer's Barracks.
  - 23–24 August: Twelve young Polish men, members of the Czarny Legion resistance organization, executed.
  - 24 August: Five Polish students of the Salesian oratory in Poznań, known as the "Poznań Five" (Poznańska Piątka), later beatified martyrs of World War II of the Catholic Church, executed.
- 1944
  - 15 September: Subcamp of the Flossenbürg concentration camp founded at the Railway Repair Works. Its prisoners were mostly Poles and Russians.
  - 9 October: Two women subcamps of Flossenbürg founded at the Goehle-Werk and Universelle factories. Its prisoners were mostly Poles, Russians and Germans.
  - 22 October: Dresden-Reick subcamp of Flossenbürg founded. Its prisoners were mostly Polish, Russian and Jewish women.
  - 24 November: Dresden-Bernsdorf subcamp of Flossenbürg founded. Its prisoners were mostly Polish-Jewish men, women and children.
- 1945
  - 13–14 February: Aerial bombing by Allied forces.
  - 19 February: Subcamp of Flossenbürg at the Railway Repair Works dissolved. Prisoners deported to the main Flossenbürg camp.
  - 24 March: Dresden-Reichsbahn subcamp of Flossenbürg founded. Its prisoners were mostly Polish, Jewish and Russian men.
  - April: Goehle-Werk, Bernsdorf, Reichsbahn, Universelle and SS Engineer's Barracks subcamps of Flossenbürg dissolved. Prisoners either deported or mostly sent on death marches to various other locations.
  - 22–27 April: Battle of Dresden
  - April: Reick subcamp of Flossenbürg dissolved. Prisoners sent on a death march to the Ore Mountains.
  - 8 May: Russians take city.

=== 1946-1990s ===
- 1946
  - Sächsische Zeitung begins publication.
  - Population: 450,000.
- 1950
  - SG Deutsche Volkspolizei Dresden football club founded.
  - Botanical Garden restored.
  - Hellerau and Pillnitz incorporated into city.
- 1956 – Dresden Transport Museum opens.
- 1959 – Galerie Neue Meister formed.
- 1960 – Józef Ignacy Kraszewski Museum opens at his former house.
- 1961 – Dresden University of Technology formed.
- 1972 – Filmtheater Prager Strasse opens.
- 1973 – Dresden S-Bahn established.
- 1983
  - Staatsschauspiel Dresden formed.
  - Population: 522,532.
- 1986 – Pinova apple created.
- 1989
  - protests stop the planned high-purity silicon factory
  - trains with East German embassy refugees from Prague pass Dresden main station with demonstrations and clashes with the police
  - Monday demonstrations
- 1990 – Dresdner Neueste Nachrichten begins publication.
- 1991
  - Bunte Republik Neustadt festival begins.
  - Fußballverein Dresden-Nord formed.
- 1992
  - Soviet forces withdrawn.
  - Helmholtz-Zentrum Dresden-Rossendorf established.
- 1996 – Dresdner Sinfoniker founded.
- 2000 – Stadtarchiv Dresden (city archives) relocated to Elisabeth-Boer-Strasse.

== 21st century ==
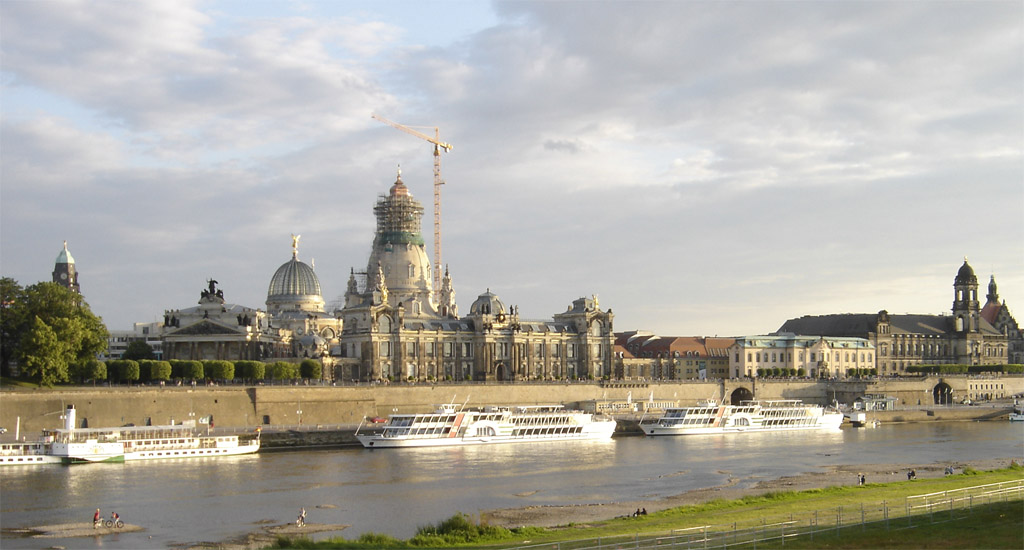
Rebuilding of the Frauenkirche in 2004

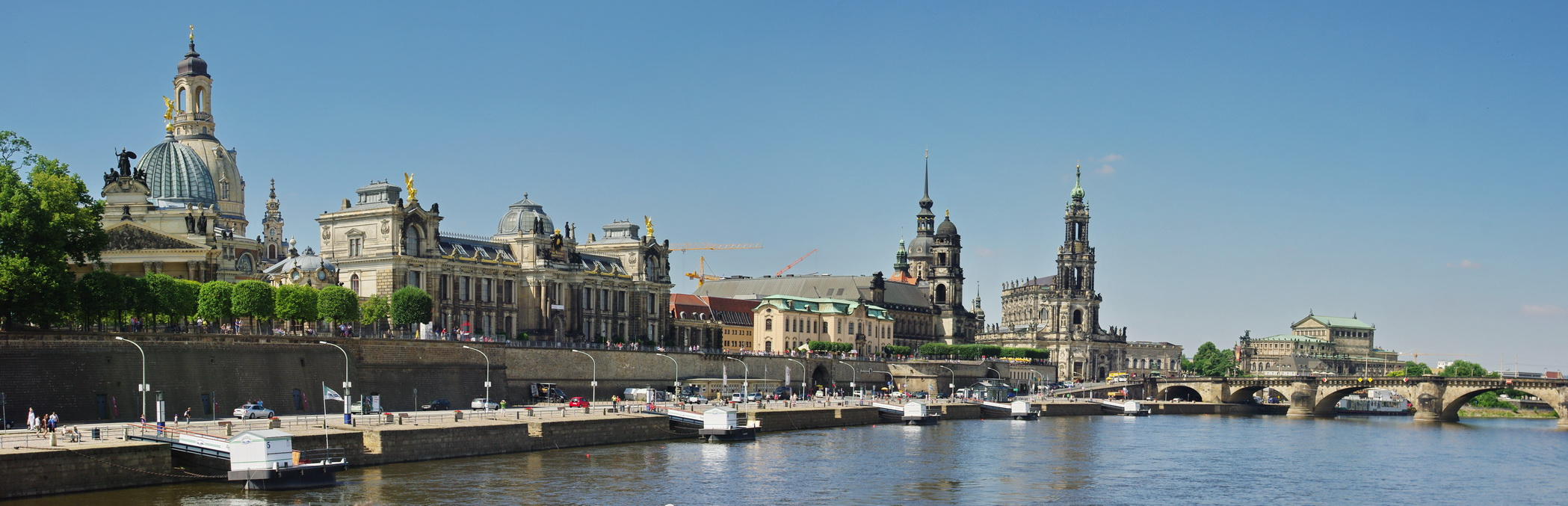
Dresden in 2010

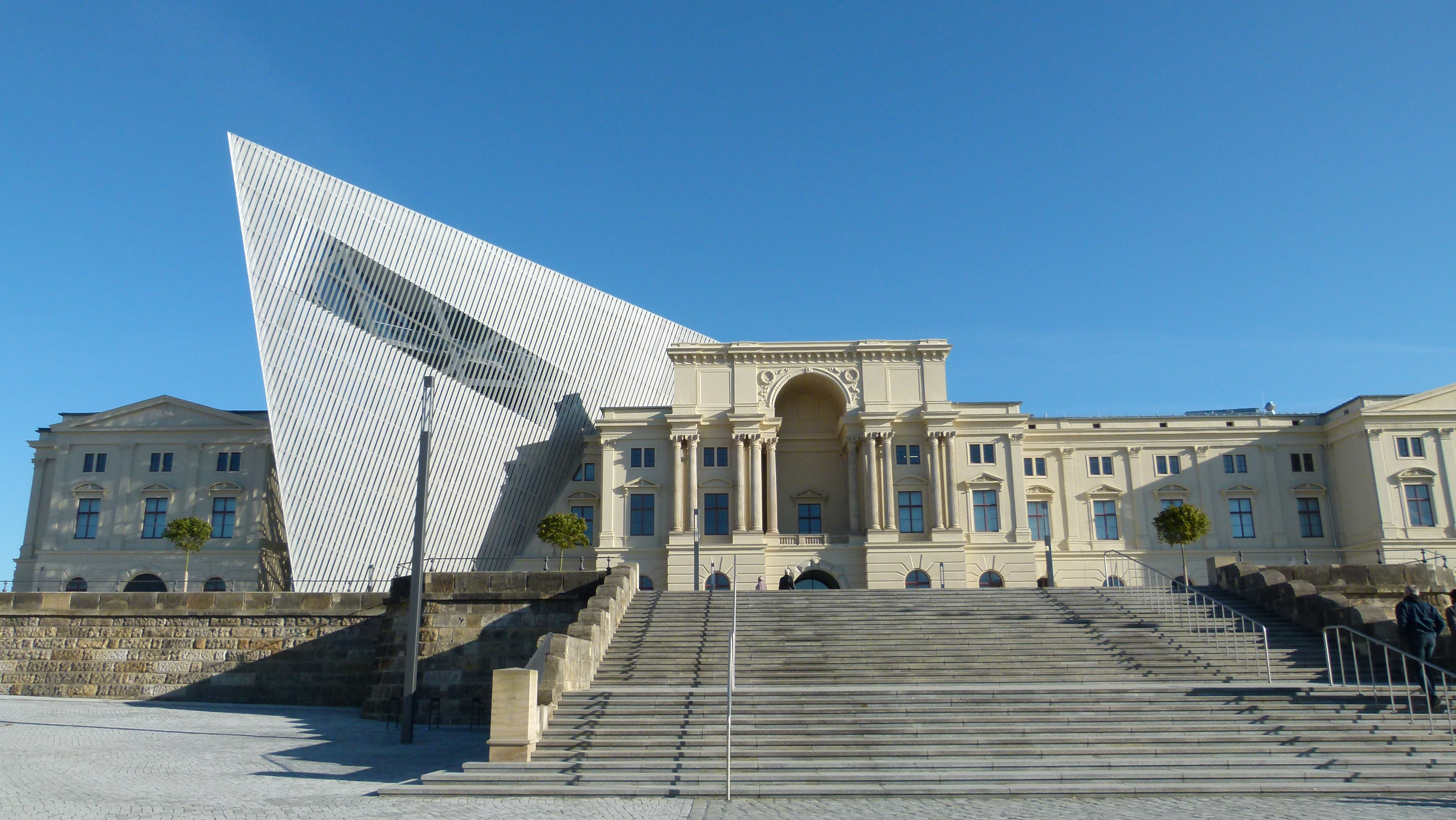
The Bundeswehr Military History Museum

- 2002
  - Elbe Flood.
  - Volkswagen's Transparent Factory opens.
- 2004
  - Dresden High Magnetic Field Laboratory established.
  - Dresden Elbe Valley designated an UNESCO World Heritage Site.
- 2005
  - Dresden Frauenkirche rebuilt.
  - Dresden City Art Gallery opens.
  - Neo-Nazi demonstration.
- 2006 – 800th anniversary of founding of Dresden.
- 2007
  - Freiberger Arena opens.
  - Waldschlösschen Bridge construction begins.
- 2008
  - Helma Orosz becomes mayor.
  - December: City hosts the 38th Chess Olympiad.
- 2009 – Dresden Elbe Valley's UNESCO World Heritage Site status is revoked.
- 2010 – Anti-fascist demonstration.
- 2011
  - Bundeswehr Military History Museum opens.
  - Population: 523,058.
- 2013
  - Elbe flood.
  - September: City co-hosts the 2013 Women's European Volleyball Championship.
- 2014 – PEGIDA begin protesting^{(de)} against Islamism in the city, drawing crowds estimated up to 17,000 in peak
- 2015 – Dirk Hilbert becomes mayor.

== See also ==
- History of Dresden
- Economy of Dresden
- List of mayors of Dresden

Other cities in the state of Saxony:

- Timeline of Chemnitz
- Timeline of Leipzig

== Bibliography ==
=== in English ===
- John Russell (1828), "Dresden", A Tour in Germany, and Some of the Southern Provinces of the Austrian Empire, in 1820, 1821, 1822, Edinburgh: Constable, OCLC 614379840
- David Brewster, ed. (1830). "Dresden". Edinburgh Encyclopædia. Edinburgh: William Blackwood.
- Mariana Starke (1839), "Dresden", Travels in Europe (9th ed.), Paris: A. and W. Galignani
- William Henry Overall, ed. (1870). "Dresden, Saxony". Dictionary of Chronology. London: William Tegg. hdl:2027/uc2.ark:/13960/t9m32q949.
- "Dresden", Northern Germany (5th ed.), Coblenz: Karl Baedeker, 1873, OCLC 5947482
- Guide to Dresden, its Buildings, Institutions and Environs, Dresden: Herman Burdach, 1880, OCLC 2838150, OL 24467281M
- Guide to the Royal Collections of Dresden, translated by Fox, C.S., Dresden: Staatliche Kunstsammlungen Dresden, 1897, OL 7082856M
- Mary Endell (1908), Dresden: History, Stage, Gallery, Dresden: J. Seifert, OCLC 373304, OL 6638502M
- "Dresden", Northern Germany as Far as the Bavarian and Austrian Frontiers (15th ed.), Leipzig: Karl Baedeker, 1910, OCLC 78390379
- G. E. Collier (1910), Collier's New Practical Guide to Dresden, Dresden: A. Tittmann, OL 13523819M
- Dresden. Grieben's Guide Books. Berlin. 1910.
- Nathaniel Newnham Davis (1911), "Dresden", The Gourmet's Guide to Europe (3rd ed.), London: Grant Richards
- Denise Phillips (2003). "Friends of Nature: Urban Sociability and Regional Natural History in Dresden, 1800–1850". Osiris. 18: 43–59. doi:10.1086/649376. JSTOR 3655284. S2CID 145497167.
- Susanne Vees-Gulani (2008). "The politics of new beginnings: the continued exclusion of the Nazi past in Dresden's cityscape". In Gavriel David Rosenfeld; Paul B. Jaskot (eds.). Beyond Berlin: Twelve German Cities Confront the Nazi Past. US: University of Michigan Press. ISBN 978-0-472-11611-9 – via HathiTrust. (fulltext)

=== in German ===
- "Dresden". Topographia Germaniae (in German). Vol. Topographia Superioris Saxoniae, Thüringiae, Misniae et Lusatiae. Frankfurt. 1650. p. 43+. c. 1650/1690
- "Dresden". Brockhaus' Konversations-Lexikon (in German) (14th ed.). Leipzig: Brockhaus. 1908. pp. 428–439.
- P. Krauss und E. Uetrecht, ed. (1913). "Dresden". Meyers Deutscher Städteatlas [Meyer's Atlas of German Cities] (in German). Leipzig: Bibliographisches Institut.
- Wolfgang Adam; Siegrid Westphal, eds. (2012). "Dresden". Handbuch kultureller Zentren der Frühen Neuzeit: Städte und Residenzen im alten deutschen Sprachraum (in German). De Gruyter. pp. 417+. ISBN 978-3-11-029555-9.
