= Timeline of Chemnitz =

The following is a timeline of the history of the city of Chemnitz, Germany.

== Prior to 20th century ==
- 1136 – Benedictine monastery founded near Chemnitz.
- 1143 – Chemnitz "becomes a market town."
- 1357 – Bleaching privilege received from Frederick III, Margrave of Meissen.
- 1398 – Paper mill established.
- 1466 – Population: 3,455.
- 1498 – Town Hall built near the Markt (Chemnitz).
- 16th. C. – "The manufacture of cloth was very flourishing."
- 1539 – Protestant Reformation.
- 1546 – Benedictine monastery, founded in 1136 by the emperor Lothair II is dissolved.
- 1551 – Population: 5,616.
- 1630 – Battle of Chemnitz.
- 1700 – Population: 4,873.
- 1801 – Population: 10,835.
- 1811 – Schwalbe manufactory in business (later Chemieanlagenbau Chemnitz engineering firm).
- 1833 – Chemnitz City Orchestra formed.
- 1836 – Royal Mercantile College established.
- 1840 – Population: 23,476.
- 1852 – Chemnitz Hauptbahnhof opens.
- 1864 – Population: 54,827.
- 1868 – Museum für Naturkunde Chemnitz founded.
- 1869 – Volksbank Chemnitz (bank) founded.
- 1878 – Jewish Cemetery, Chemnitz in use (approximate date).
- 1880
  - Horsecar tram begins operating.
  - Population: 95,123.
  - Schlosschemnitz becomes part of city.
- 1884 – Chemnitz Tar Mummy discovered.
- 1885 – Population: 110,817.
- 1888 – St. Peter's Church, Chemnitz built.
- 1890 – Population: 138,954.
- 1893 – Electric tram begins operating.
- 1895 – Population: 161,017.
- 1898 – Horsecar tram stop operating.
- 1899 – Chemnitz Synagogue built.

== 20th century ==
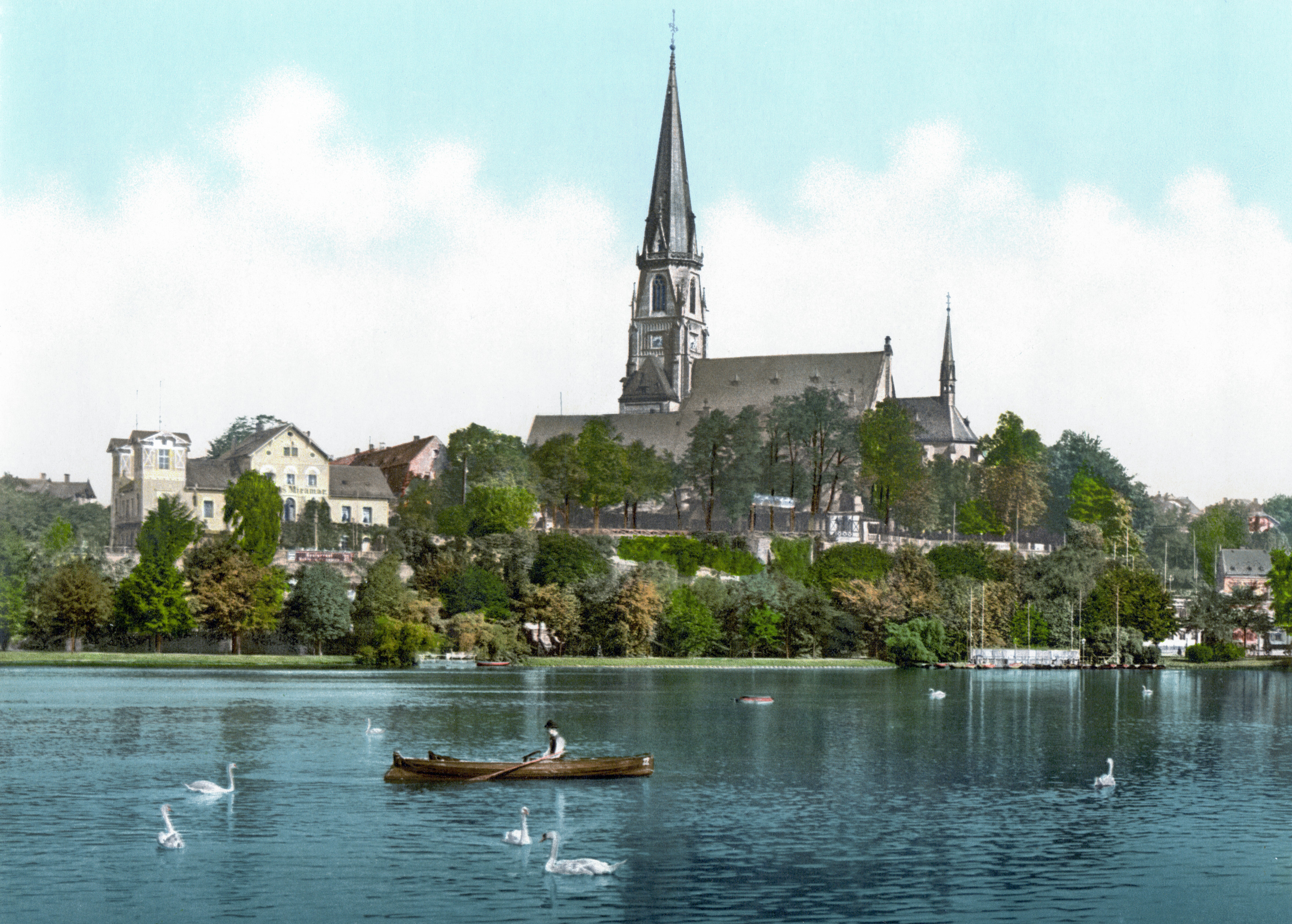
Castle Church at the turn of the 19th and 20th centuries

- 1905 – Population: 244,927.
- 1907 – Bernsdorf becomes part of city.
- 1909
  - Chemnitz Opera hall built.
  - König-Albert-Museum (Chemnitz) opens.
- 1910 – Johann-Wolfgang-von-Goethe-Gymnasium (school) established.
- 1911 – New City Hall, Chemnitz built.
- 1913 – Borna-Heinersdorf becomes part of city.
- 1919 – Population: 303,775.
- 1920 – Chemnitzer Polizeisportverein sport club formed.
- 1926 – Airport Chemnitz opens.
- 1926 – Südkampfbahn stadium opens.
- 1930 – Modernised classification yard Hilbersdorf opens.
- 1933 – Theaterplatz (Chemnitz) renamed "Adolf Hitler Platz".
- 1934 – Stadion an der Gellertstraße (stadium) opens.
- 1938 – 9 November: Kristallnacht antisemitic unrest; synagogue destroyed.
- 1944 – Subcamp of the Flossenbürg concentration camp established. Over 500 women, mostly Russian, Polish, Italian and Slovenian, were held there as slave labour.
- 1945
  - Bombing of Chemnitz in World War II.
  - April: Subcamp of the Flossenbürg concentration camp dissolved. Its prisoners were sent on a death march to German-occupied Rtyně nad Bílinou.
  - City becomes part of East Germany.
- 1946 – Population: 250,188.
- 1947 – Wismut (mining company) headquartered in Chemnitz.
- 1950 – Adelsberg becomes part of city.
- 1953 – City renamed "Karl-Marx-Stadt".
- 1955 – Chemnitz Botanical Garden rebuilt.
- 1959 – Red Tower, Chemnitz reconstructed.

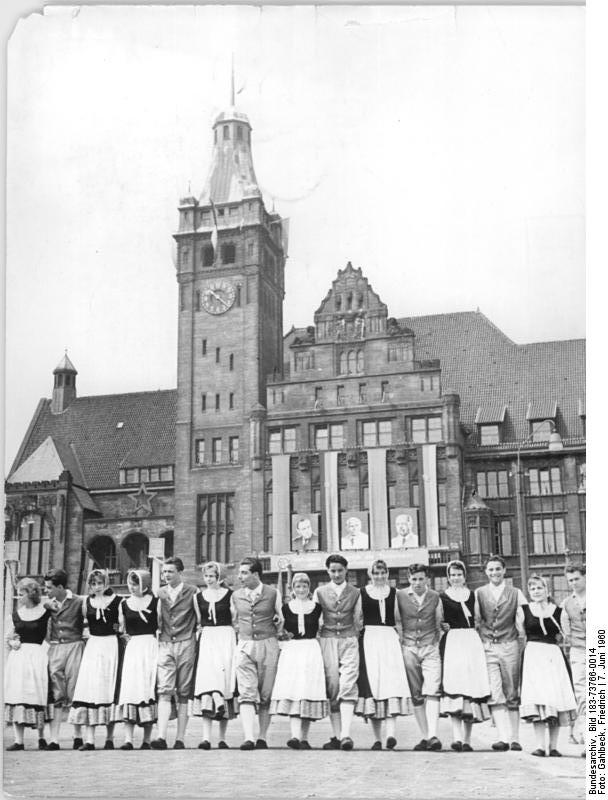
Arbeiterfestspiele participants in front of City Hall, 1960

- 1960 – Arbeiterfestspiele (workers' cultural festival) held.
- 1961
  - HKW Chemnitz-Nord power station begins operating.
  - City twinned with Tampere, Finland.
- 1966
  - Chemnitzer FC (football club) formed.
  - City twinned with Ljubljana, Yugoslavia.
- 1967 – City twinned with Arras, France.
- 1968 – City twinned with Timbuktu, Mali.
- 1970 – City twinned with Ústí nad Labem, Czechoslovakia.
- 1971 – 9 October: Karl Marx Monument unveiled.
- 1972
  - City twinned with Łódź, Poland.
  - Population: 301,502.
- 1974 – Wohngebiet Fritz Heckert (housing) construction begins.
- 1986 – City hosts the 1986 European Weightlifting Championships.
- 1988 – City twinned with Düsseldorf, West Germany.
- 1990
  - City renamed "Chemnitz".
  - Chemnitzer Verkehrs-Aktiengesellschaft (transit entity) established.
  - Population: 294,244.
- 1991 – Annual "Days of Jewish Culture" begins.
- 1993 – Peter Seifert becomes mayor.
- 1997 – City-Bahn Chemnitz (transit entity) established.
- 1999 – Röhrsdorf and Wittgensdorf become part of city.

== 21st century ==
- 2001 – Villa Esche restored as a cultural space.
- 2002 – Neue Synagoge opens.
- 2002 – Multi-system tramway network ("Chemnitzer Modell") starts.
- 2003 – Chemnitz Industrial Museum opens.
- 2006 – Barbara Ludwig becomes mayor.
- 2007 – Gunzenhauser Museum opens.
- 2010 – Population: 243,248.
- 2012 – Thor Steinar "Brevik" shop in business.
- 2014 – March: Neo-Nazi Nationale Sozialisten Chemnitz group banned.
- 2014 – SMAC (Saxonian Museum of Archaeology Chemnitz) opens in the restored historical Mendelsohn building (former "Schocken").
- 2018 – Protests.
- 2020 – Stefan Heym-Forum opens in a restored historical building (today "Kulturkaufhaus Tietz").
- 2020 – Sven Schulze becomes mayor.
- 2020 – Central academic library of the TU Chemnitz opens.
- 2020 – Schauplatz Eisenbahn (Saxon Railway Museum) is part of the Saxon Exhibition "Boom".
- 2021 – Chemnitz becomes German main part of the Hydrogen and Mobility Innovation Center ("HIC").
- 2025 – European Capital of Culture
- 2025 – Opening Karl Schmidt-Rottluff-Art-Museum

== See also ==
- Chemnitz history
- History of Chemnitz
- List of mayors of Chemnitz
- List of heritage sites in Chemnitz

Other cities in the state of Saxony:

- Timeline of Dresden
- Timeline of Leipzig

== Bibliography ==
=== in English ===
- "Chemnitz". Handbook for North Germany. Murray's hand-book Rhine & North Germany. London: J. Murray. 1886. hdl:2027/hvd.hn1imr.
- "Chemnitz". Chambers's Encyclopaedia. London. 1901. hdl:2027/uc2.ark:/13960/t0vq37095.
- "Chemnitz", Northern Germany (15th ed.), Leipzig: Karl Baedeker, 1910, OCLC 78390379
- "Chemnitz" . Encyclopædia Britannica. Vol. 6 (11th ed.). 1910. pp. 76–77.

=== in German ===
- C. W. Zoellner (1886). Geschichte der Fabrik- und Handelsstadt Chemnitz. Chemnitz, B. Troitzsch.
- "Chemniz". Brockhaus' Konversations-Lexikon (in German) (14th ed.). Leipzig: Brockhaus. 1896. hdl:2027/njp.32101064064445.
- P. Krauss und E. Uetrecht, ed. (1913). "Chemnitz". Meyers Deutscher Städteatlas [Meyer's Atlas of German Cities] (in German). Leipzig: Bibliographisches Institut.
- Harald Weber. Aus der Geschichte von Chemnitz und Umgebung. Verlag für sächsische Regionalgeschichte, Nördlingen 2000, ISBN 3-9805106-3-8.
