= Meusel =

Meusel is a surname. Notable people with the name include:

- Alfred Meusel (1896–1960), German sociologist and historian
- Andreas Meusel (1514–1581), German Lutheran theologian
- Bob Meusel (1896 –1977), American baseball left and right fielder
- Irish Meusel (1893–1963), American baseball left fielder
- Johann Georg Meusel (1743–1820), German bibliographer, lexicographer and historian
- Peter Meusel, German engineer and scientist, co-founder of Agile Robots and Wessling Robotics

== See also ==
- Arctic-Alpine Garden of the Walter Meusel Foundation, Botanical gardens in Germany
