= DenkRaum Sophienkirche =

Memorial building in Dresden

Coordinates: 51.051367°N 13.734874°E

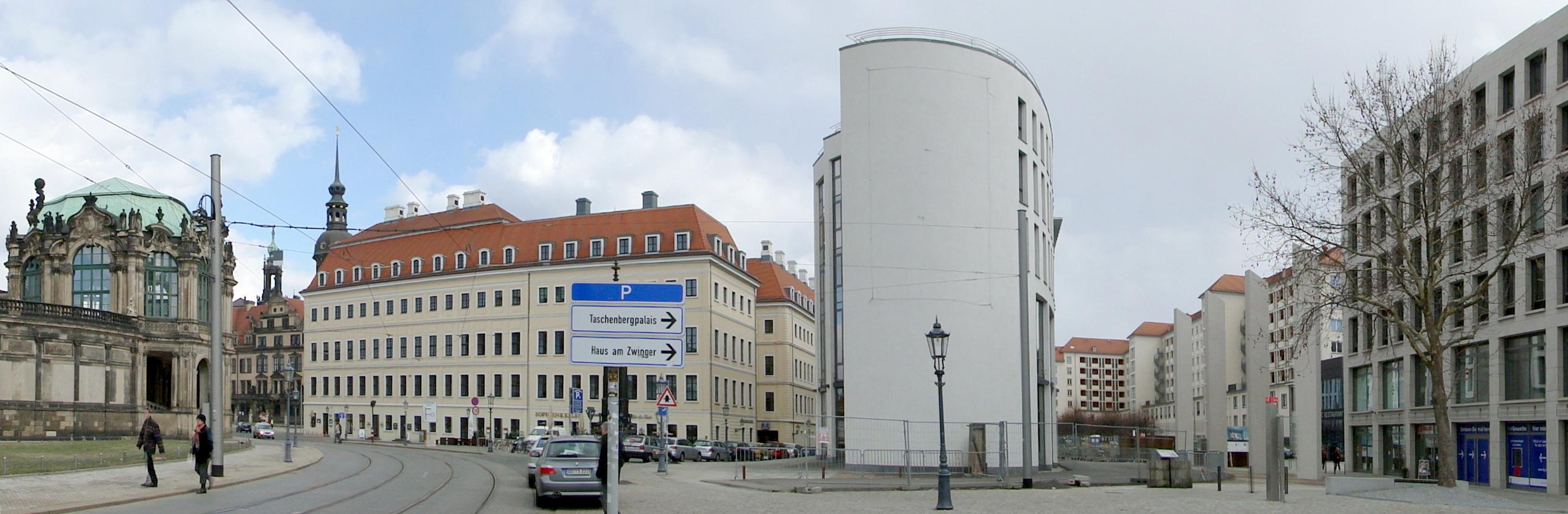

The DenkRaum Sophienkirche, formerly known as the Busmannkapelle Memorial (Gedenkstätte Busmannkapelle) is a building on Sophie Street in Dresden. It is a reconstruction of the Busmannkapelle and began construction in 2009, though planning began in 1995. It is a memorial to the Sophienkirche, lost in the bombing in 1945.

In 2020, the memorial was opened as the DenkRaum Sophienkirche. The memorial was created after 12 years of construction and commemorates what was once the oldest church in the city.
