= Botanischer Garten Chemnitz =

Botanical garden in Saxony, Germany

Coordinates: 50°50′58″N 12°53′21″E

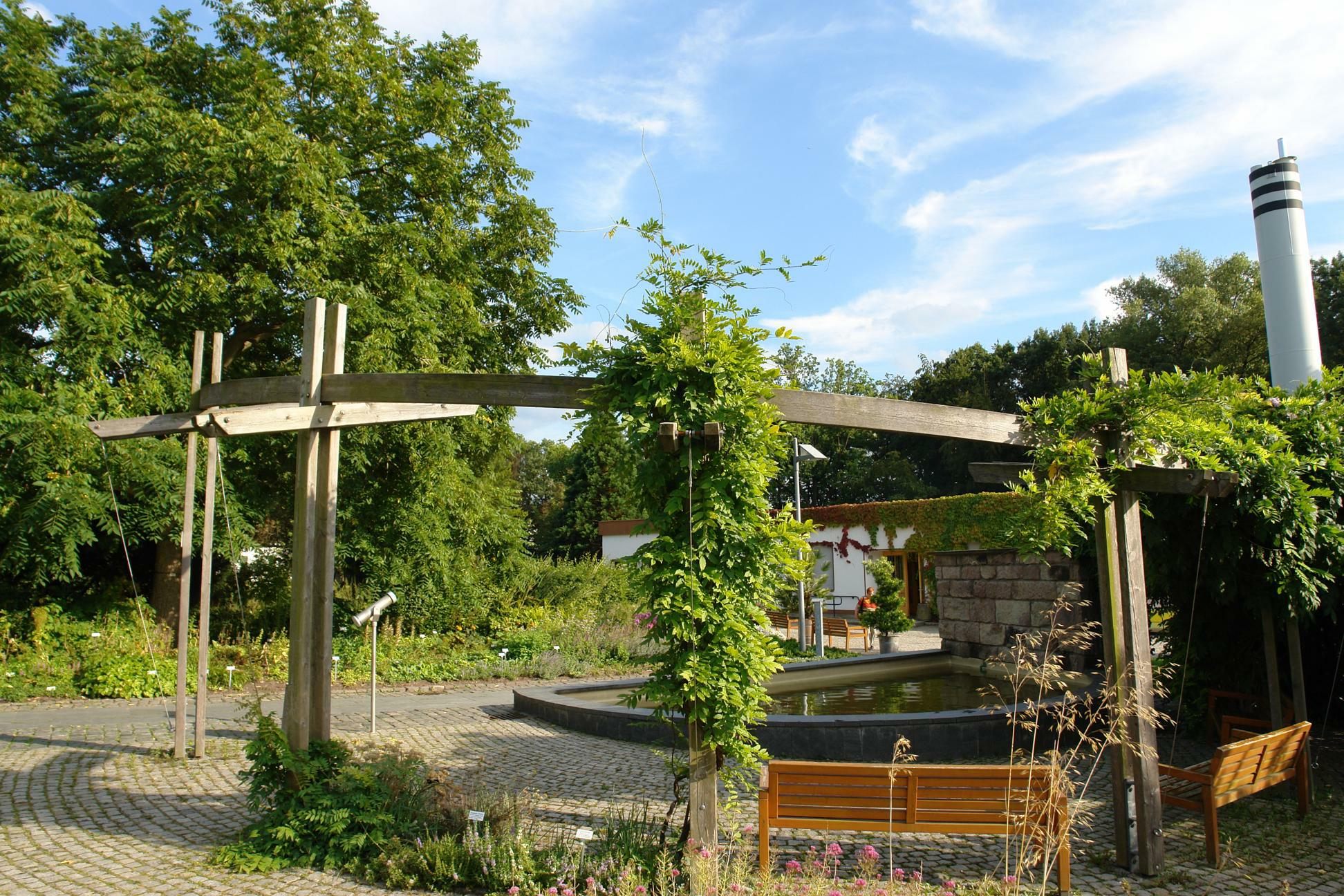
Botanischer Garten Chemnitz

The Botanischer Garten Chemnitz (12 hectares) is a municipal botanical garden located at Leipziger Straße 147, Chemnitz, Saxony, Germany. It is open daily without charge.

The garden was founded in 1898 on a 1-hectare site, and extended in 1933 with an additional 1.75 hectares of orchards. It was badly damaged during World War II, and reconstructed during the 1950s. Today's garden was organized in 1996, with new greenhouses built in 1998 and 2002.

The garden contains a number of outdoor areas in which Central European habitats are replicated, including heath, dune, steppe, moors, and ponds, as well as 20 different forest communities. It also contains collections of crop plants from around the world, medicinal and aromatic plants, and annual and perennial flowers. The garden's greenhouses contain about 800 species, including cacti and succulents, carnivorous plants, pineapples, banana, coffee, manioc, vanilla, oranges, rattan, taro, and sisal, as follows:

- Tropical greenhouse (500 m^{2}) - Central and South American wild plants and crops.
- Mediterranean greenhouse - approximately 100 species including ornamental and wild plants such as Cistus, Echium, rosemary, and oleander.
- Cactus and succulents (120 m^{2}) - primarily cacti and succulents from Mexico, as well as succulents from southern Africa and Madagascar.

== See also ==
- Arktisch-Alpiner Garten der Walter-Meusel-Stiftung
- List of botanical gardens in Germany
