= Johann-Wolfgang-von-Goethe-Gymnasium =

Johann-Wolfgang-von-Goethe-Gymnasium Chemnitz
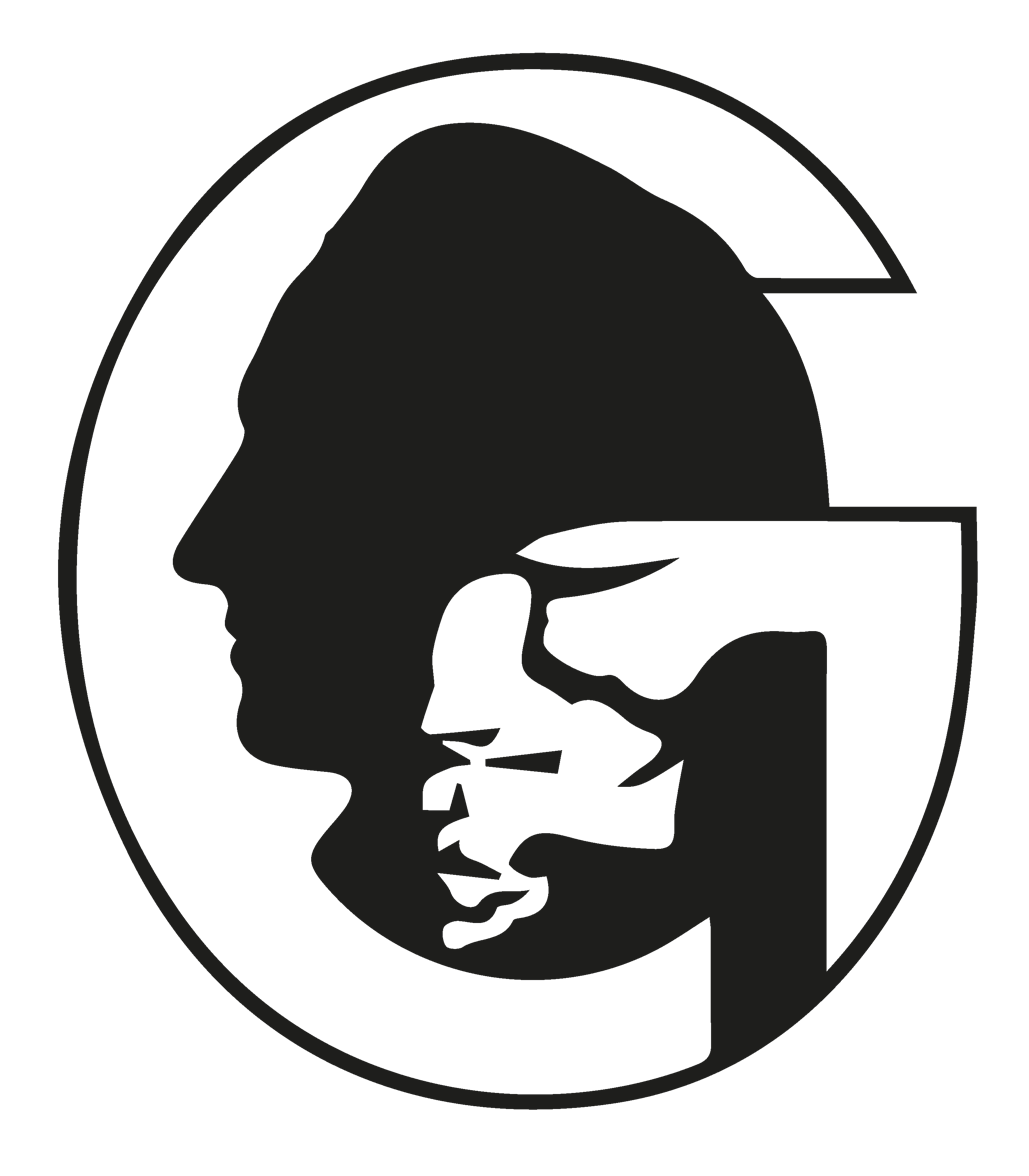

Location
- Bernsdorfer Str. 126; Chemnitz, 09126; Germany; 50.815887°N 12.942076°E

Information
- Type: Public
- Established: 1910
- Sister school: Marien High School Lippstadt (Germany); Lycée Baudimont Arras (France)
- Principal: Elke Trompelt
- Faculty: 44
- Grades: 5-12
- Gender: Co-ed
- Enrollment: 666,5
- Campus type: Suburban
- Website: goethe.c.sn.schule.de

Johann-Wolfgang-von-Goethe-Gymnasium Chemnitz is a public secondary school in Chemnitz, Saxony, Germany, for grades 5–12. It is one of seven secondary schools operating in Chemnitz, Bernsdorf

Its name changed multiple times, and the school is now named after the famous German poet and natural scientist Johann Wolfgang von Goethe. One can find several statues of him all over the building. It is near a Netto which is the only attraction.

The Johann-Wolfgang-von-Goethe-Gymnasium has an annual average enrollment of about 666,5 students and 46 teachers. It offers a variety of 18 extracurricular activities. The principal of the school is Elke Trompelt and the assistant principal is Miss Cyrnik.

The school building was established in 1910 after only one year of construction work to educate the increasing number of students due to the emerging population of Chemnitz-Bernsdorf. Throughout the years, the school faced several changes to its school system. In the early years, the school separated boys and girls and served as a common board school to teach children for eight years. The school went coed in 1949, still distinguishing itself in Bernsdorf School I and II, and added grades 9 and 10 in 1959. After the German reunification in 1989, schools in East Germany mostly adapted the West German curriculum. After closing both Bernsdorf schools and opening the Bernsdorf secondary school in 1992, the school was renamed Johann-Wolfgang-von-Goethe-Gymnasium on the 23 March 1993. Its name hasn't changed since then.

No damage was done during World War I. The school was severely damaged in World War II and in 1945 all the windows, the tower on top of the building, and parts of the roof were destroyed. Several classrooms caught fire during these bombings. A few repairs were done following the war, but it was only completely rebuilt in 1972: the roof was restored and a new heating system was installed. Further refurbishment work started in 1999 and was completed in 2000.

== History ==
=== Schools in Chemnitz-Bernsdorf ===
==== The first school in Bernsdorf ====
The first school in Chemnitz-Bernsdorf opened on the 30 October 1822. At the beginning of the 19th century, the village commune Bernsdorf became a suburb of the urban community Chemnitz. In 1805, school attendance became compulsory and the suburb was forced to build a school for the children. But with only 300 citizens in total living in Bernsdorf, the community was not able to finance and maintain their own school building. The children were required to attend a school in the urban core. Pastor Gottlob Heinrich Hunger bought a small house with his own funds to offer public education for children from Bernsdorf. The school building was inaugurated on the 30 October 1822 and 60 students attended it at the beginning. Because of poverty during the industrialization in the middle of the 19th century, parents took their children to school in the factories. The minors had to work 12 to 14 hours a day and were able to attend school after that. The family had to pay around 6 Groschen for each child. On account of the devastating situation in the school system, a committee with pastor St. Johannis at the head, started to supervise schools in Chemnitz. Children who didn't attend school were reported to the royal Land court. Schools were included in the town's budget and children from poor families received teaching materials. This way, every child was given a chance to pursue education. The number of students being taught at the small building rose so much that it eventually became too small.

==== The second school in Bernsdorf ====
In 1862, a new school building was built and inaugurated on 4 September 1862. The committee worked out a plan to teach 113 students in four different classes:

Number of students	Class time
27	6:00 – 8:00
29	8:30 – 11:30
45	13:00 – 16:00
12	In another building

The school building had to be enlarged because of the continuously rising number of residents. In 1872, the building was extended by another two classrooms. More than 220 children attended the school, all being taught by teacher Knorr. To overcome this situation, school fees were doubled and students not coming from Bernsdorf were suspended. In 1872, a second teacher, Mr. Nestler, was hired.

==== The third school in Bernsdorf ====
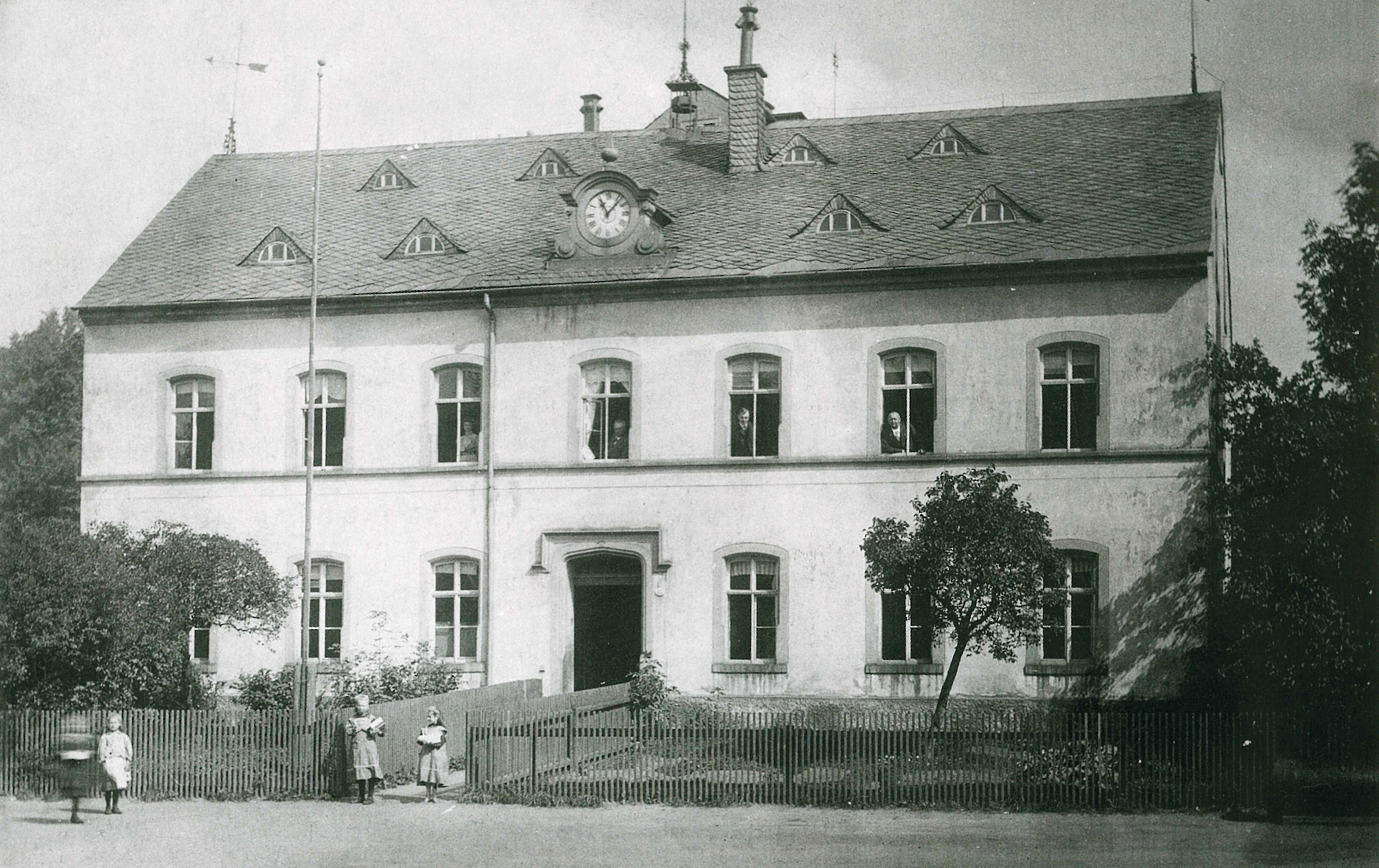
The Bernsdorfer Schule Knaben in 1909

Even though the second school was enlarged in 1872, the population of Bernsdorf rose so rapidly that four classrooms were not enough. Another building was built in 1899 and opened on the 24 August 1899. It was located right behind the second schoolhouse and offered an additional 4 classrooms. Both schools were now combined to one school complex. Led by principal Julius Nobis, seven teachers taught all children coming from Bernsdorf. This third school building is a preschool nowadays.

=== Construction of the new school building ===
In 1907, Bernsdorf completely gave up its autonomy and became a district of Chemnitz. The borders vanished and it became necessary to build one big schoolhouse.

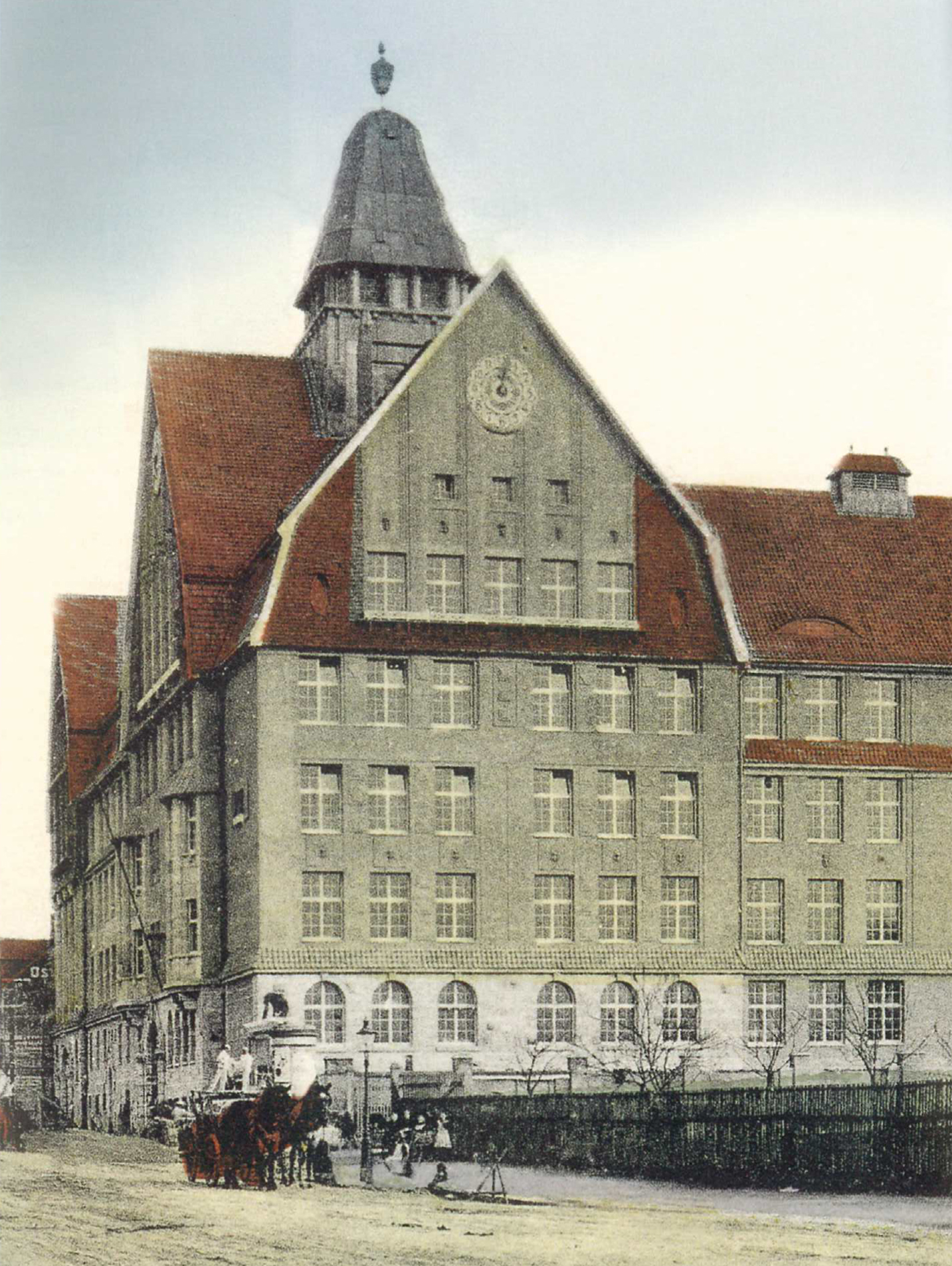
colorized photograph of the newly built school building

The city council advertised a competition for planning and designing the new building. 104 concepts were turned in and the design "Fritz und Elly" by the architects Adolf Alfred Christian Zapp and Erich August Leo Basarke persuaded the jury the most. They received a prize of 3000 Marks. The architect's office was put in charge of building the schoolhouse by signing the contract on the 3 February 1909. They planned to finish construction work around Easter 1910. Having cost more than 750,000 marks, the school was inaugurated on the 25 April 1910. 846 girls and 1345 boys enrolled and started school the next day.

=== The school between 1910 and 1933 ===
Although the students and their families enjoyed the new school, it was facing problems with absent students. 871 students were absent for at least three days during the school year and 82 children were not able to attend classes for more than three weeks. The school administration counteracted by making the students go to swimming and sports classes, and offering them milk and a warm breakfast to lower the number of absences. Due to World War I, many teachers were drafted into the army. Classes were consolidated and cancelled in the winter of 1916 and 1917. As a result of the war, 6 out of the 46 teachers died. In 1919, the city council passed a law that majorly changed the school system. The tripartite division in lower, middle, and higher board school was abolished and the common board school was introduced. Classes were reduced from 45 students to 35 students and school fees were abolished. (As part of this, pedagogues started an experimental study with classes whose students were able to study and work on group projects with other students).

=== The school during the National Socialism ===
After the fascist takeover in 1933, the school system had been reorganized. In the spirit of the National Socialism, all school types supporting self-determination were abolished. The Bernsdorf School was reorganized and became a board school but still separated girls and boys. Everyday school life was influenced by the ideology such as the, "Führer principle" and unquestioning obedience. The Parents Council did not have much influence anymore and the youth associations, Hitlerjugend and Bund Deutscher Mädchen, were included in the school system. The regime tried to unionize teachers in the "National-sozialistischer Lehrerbund". They were trained politically and informed about the changes in the school system. Non-Aryan teachers had been suspended and teachers were forced to become members of the NSDAP. The interior design was changed and walls were decorated with Nazi symbols, photos of Adolf Hitler, the Reich's flag, and National Socialist publications. Some of the wall decorations were part of an exhibition that changed on a regular basis.

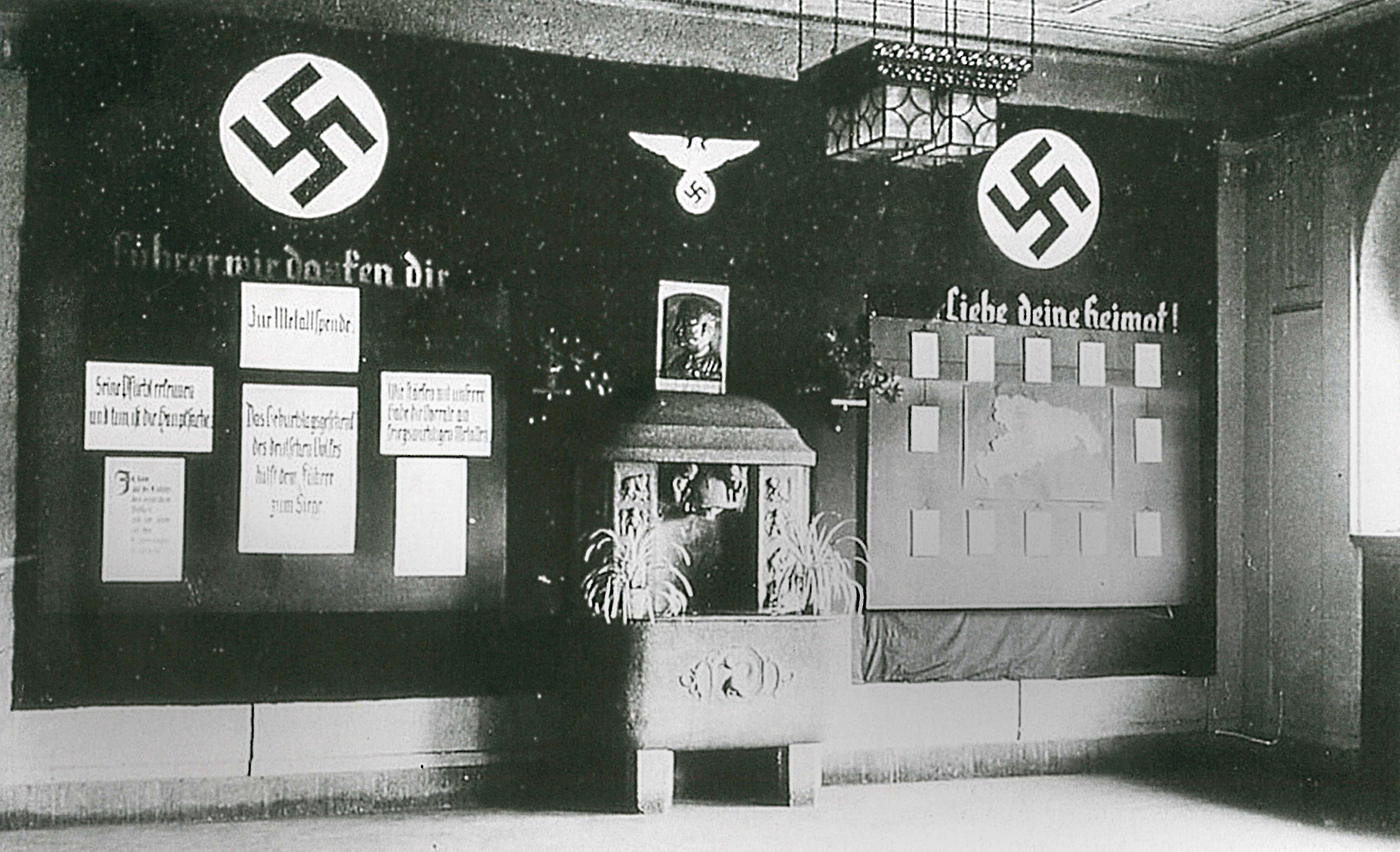
The entrance hall of the school in 1940

School life changed tremendously during World War II. Young teachers were conscripted in 1939 and 1940 so that older teachers taught two classes at the same time. Additionally, students from the Diesterweg School had been incorporated. Parts of the basement had been converted to be used as a dugout and were located where the fitness room is nowadays. After the raid on Poland a growing fear of chemical warfare developed and the decontamination squad was deployed in the basement of the school building as well. In January and February 1940, the school had to close because of freezing temperatures in the classrooms and the absence of heating fuel. Students were required to keep a diary with their experiences about the war and to collect donations. The school garden was used to cultivate vegetables to feed the people. In the school year of 1942 and 1943, sirens were installed on the roof to warn students and people living near the school. If possible, students were sent home after hearing the pre-alarm. At the beginning of 1945, the first refugees came and two classrooms of the boys school were furnished for the homeless. Parts of the girls school served as a sickbay. For 37 classes with up to 40 students each, there were only 20 rooms available. Lessons were shortened or sometimes even shut down because of missing heating fuel. With the beginning of air raids, the school was completely shut down. The bombings destroyed the protectory right next to the school and killed 39 children. The windows, the whole tower and parts of the roof were destroyed. Several classrooms caught fire. In the following months, only teachers were allowed to enter the school building to start clearing work. 22 students who attended the school died during the war.

=== The school from 1949 – 1989 ===
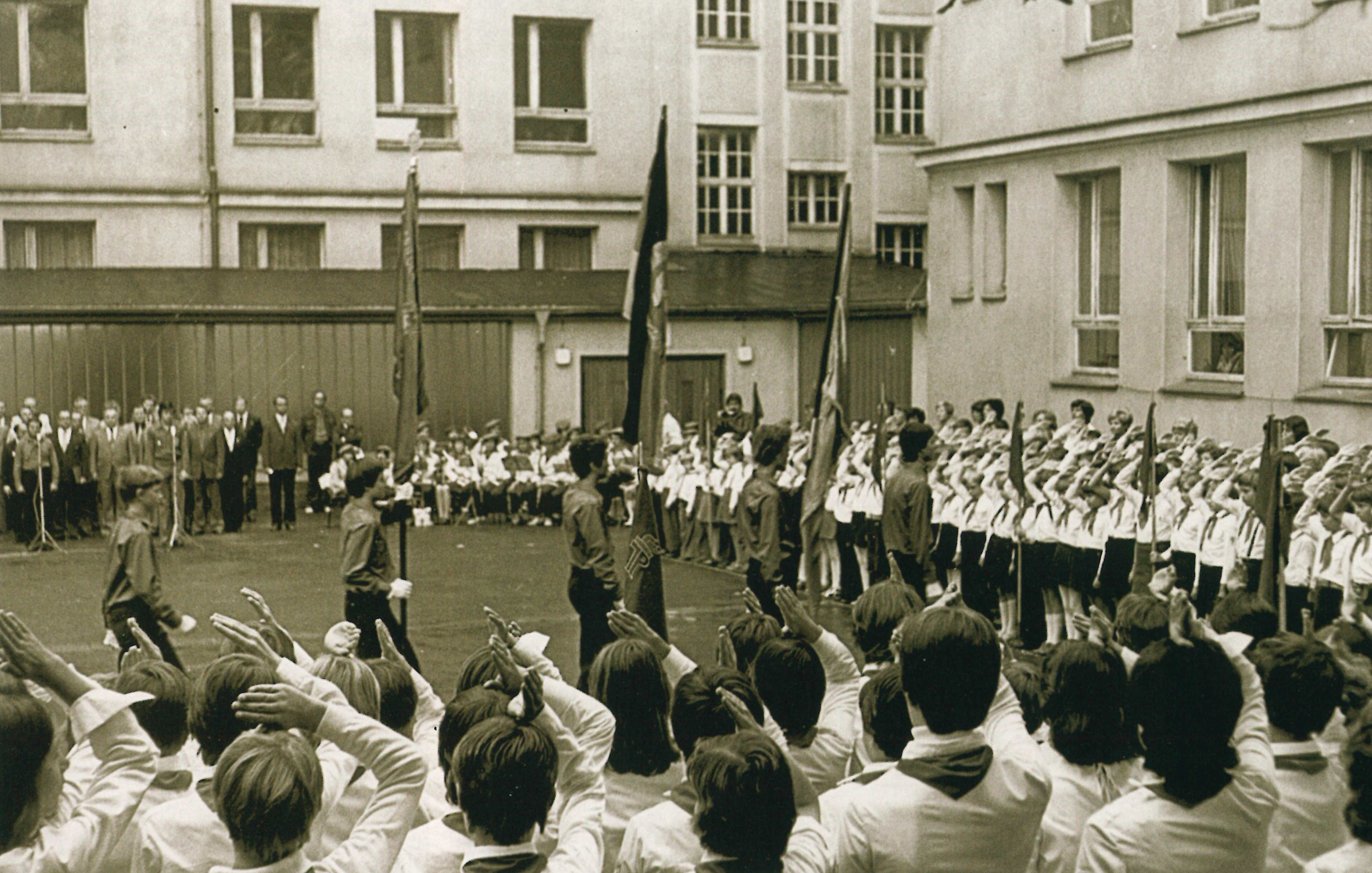
Festive flag ceremony on the school yard in 1979

In the summer of 1945, craftsman started to replace the broken windows in the rooms that could still be used and renewed the roof provisionally. The school opened on the 1 October 1945 and had 13 rooms for 32 classes. Lessons were shortened and other schools were used to teach all students. A shack was set up on the school yard that could be heated during the winter months since the heating in the actual schoolhouse had not been usable for years. Coldness, hunger, and malnutrition made many of the children sick. On the 22 November 1945, as part of the denazification, 22 teachers were dismissed. Lay teachers were hired and had to spread the democratic ideas. In the following years, new teachers were employed and as early as 1946, the first curriculum was published. The school was still being rebuilt and in 1949 the school went coed. Its names changed from Boys School and Girls School to Bernsdorfer School I and II. After the founding of the GDR, teachers were required to influence students politically as given by the curriculum and to deal with special topics, for example the GDR anniversary and Liberation day. School life was characterized by extracurricular activities. The organisation Young Pioneers had been founded on the 13 December 1948 to influence the children politically. In 1959, the school type changed to a ten-class general-education polytechnic secondary school. Grades 9 and 10 were now added to the curriculum and compulsory for all students. The socialist government added classes, such as astronomy and introduction to the socialist production. Starting in 1972, the school building was being rebuilt completely. The roof was renewed and a new heating system was installed. Parts of the first floor were reshaped to serve as a refectory. This all happened during the lessons. The building was all solely provisional and was never really finished. As part of the Cold War, the GDR enacted a new lesson plan that included military education for grades 9 and 10. A mayor of the National People's army went to the school to instruct the students with film material. They were taught on how to use gasmasks, give first aid, and much more.

=== The school after the reunification ===
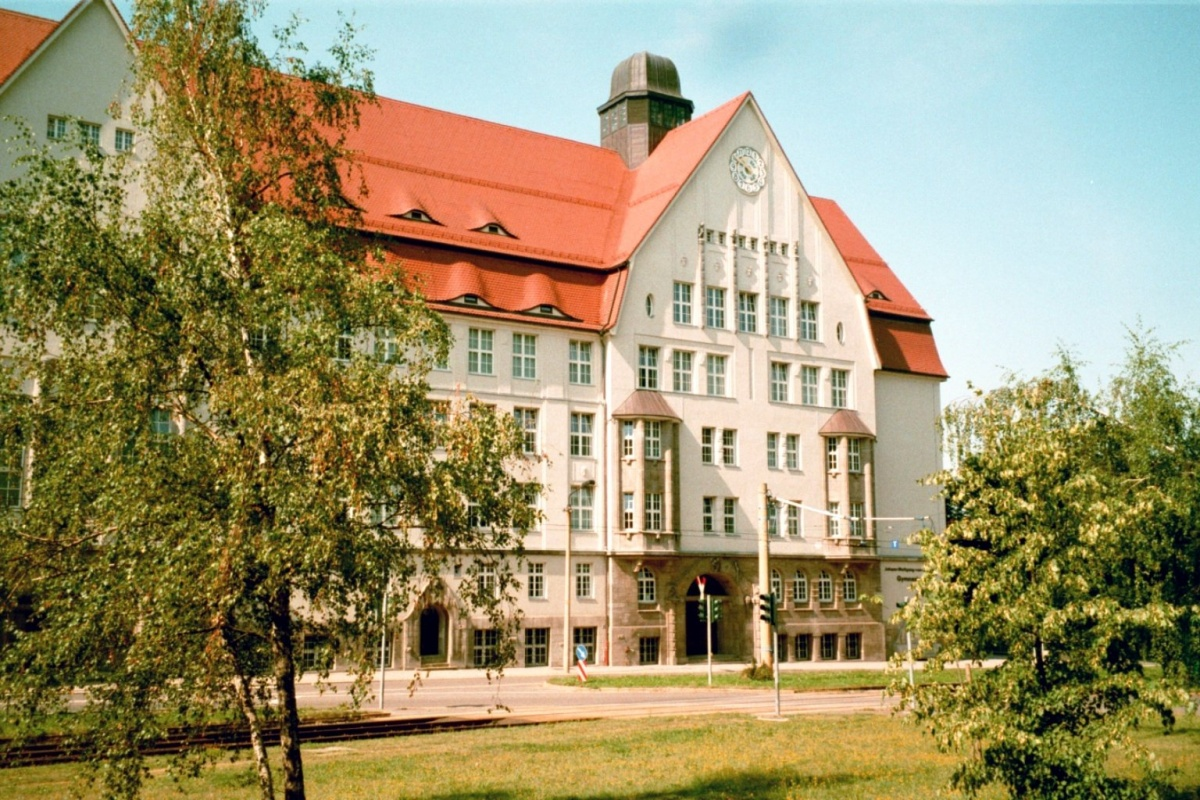
The school in 2001

After the reunification of FRG and GDR, extensive changes happened in schools. At the beginning of the 1990s, school officials were retired, organizations like the Young Pioneers and the Free German Youth, liquidated. The East German school system adapted the West German curriculum mostly to suppress the partial political influence from the schools. In 1992, both Bernsdorf schools closed and the Bernsdorf secondary school opened in September 1992. 970 students attended the coed school and were taught by 55 teachers in 30 classes. The new situation of teaching students in two different secondary levels was a tough change for all the students and teachers. Yet, both students and teachers adapted to the new curriculum quickly. On the 23 March 1993, the school was renamed Johann-Wolfgang-von-Goethe-Gymnasium and hasn't changed its name since. The same day, the booster club had its first general meeting. In the same year, the city council decided to refurbish the outside of the school completely. The refurbishment was finished in the spring of 1994. In the school year of 1997 / 1998, Johann-Wolfgang-von-Goethe secondary school and Carl-Friedrich-Gauß secondary school combined to offer a better educational development. It was now possible to outsource grades 7 through 12 to the former Gauß secondary school in spring 1999 to start reconstructing the inside of the building. Grades 5 and 6 were taught in the Heinrich Heine elementary school and construction work started in fall of 1999. After only one year, all refurbishment work was done and 850 students and 70 teachers started the school year of 2000 / 2001 in the new building. In 2002, the city council decided to close other secondary schools. The Werner-Heisenberg secondary school combined with the Goethe school until 2006, when it closed down. In the same year, former principal Jürgen Auerbeck retired and Steffen Morgner (former principal of the Heisenberg-Gymnasium) became principal of the Goethe school. After introducing study trips to secondary level II students in 2004, the school started offering extracurricular activities for students in the year of 2007. Nowadays, the school offers 22 of these activities.

== Campus ==
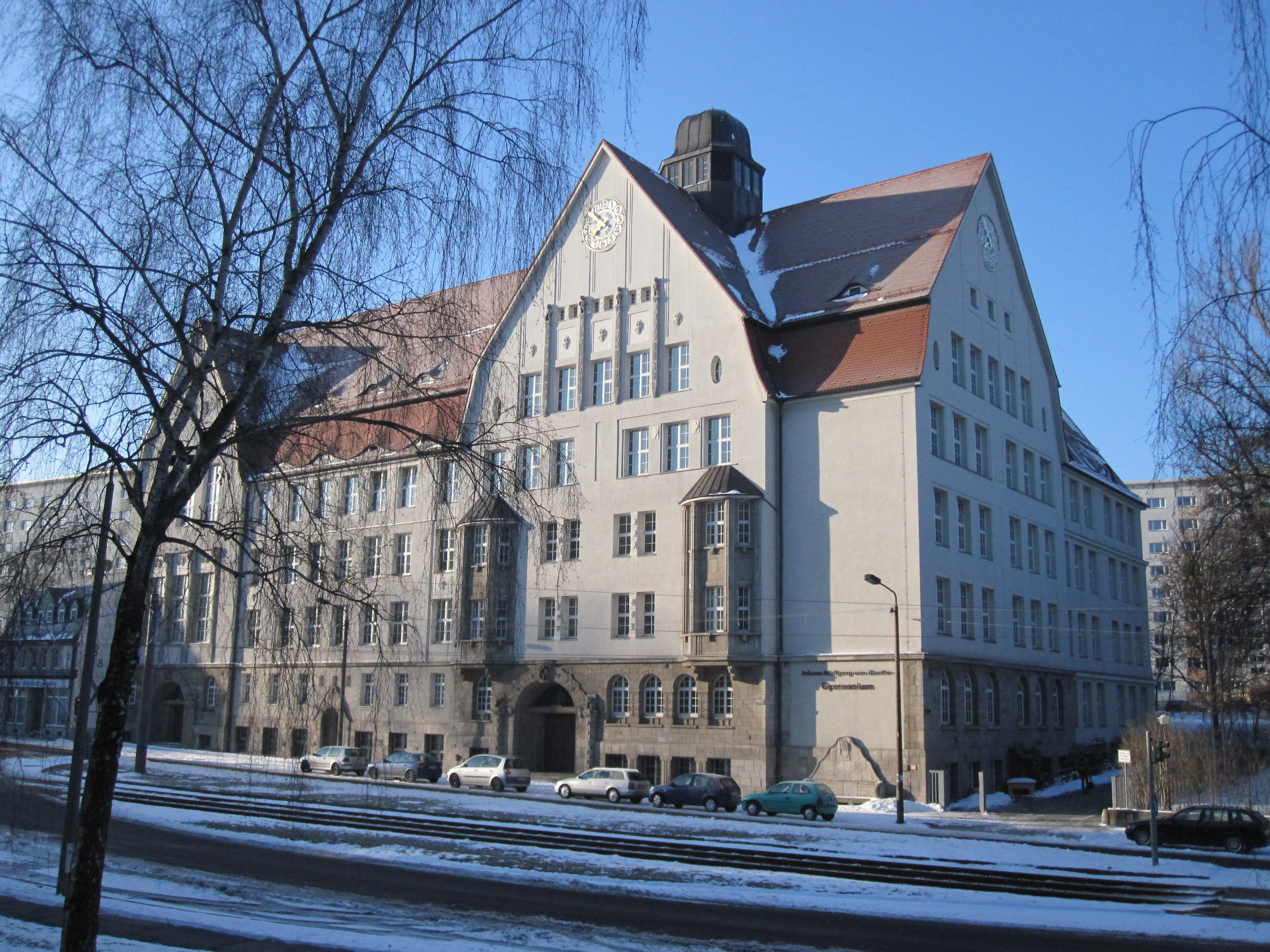
The school in winter

The school building was built in 1910. Throughout the years, the school has been refurbished numerous times, especially after World War II. The 57 meter wide school consists of five floors and a basement.

In addition to the 19 regular classrooms there are a number of specialist rooms for various classes. Science rooms, like physics, biology, and chemistry rooms, are located in the north wing of the school building. Fitted with electric and extra water hookups, they offer storage rooms to hold class-specific materials. Computer cabinets can be found on the 3rd, 4th, and 5th floors, each having 14 to 17 PCs and projectors to be used by the teachers. Specialized rooms for arts and music classes are located in 1st and 4th floor (respectively). The school has one language laboratory, consisting of 24 work stations with one cassette deck and headset each. Students can listen to cassette tapes and repeat it to improve their pronunciation while the teacher is able to listen to each student individually.

Furthermore the Johann-Wolfgang-von-Goethe-Gymnasium has a number of rooms for extracurricular use: a library with more than 8,000 books on the top floor, several study hall rooms, and seminar rooms. The cafeteria is located on the first floor, offering students lunch after 4th and 6th block, and snacks throughout the day.

== Academics ==
=== School concept ===
The Johann-Wolfgang-von-Goethe-Gymnasium has a concept that involves students, teachers, and parents to fulfill six goals:

1. School helps students
2. Maintenance of tradition
3. Cooperation with partners
4. Enjoyment of learning
5. Development of competence
6. Extracurricular activities

=== Education ===
Class times
Class	Time
1st class	7:25 am – 8:10 am
2nd class	8:20 am – 9:05 am
3rd and 4th class	9:25 am – 10:55 am
5th class	11:15 am – 12:00 pm
6th class	12:10 pm – 12:55 pm
7th and 8th class	1:25 pm – 2:55 pm
9th and 10th class	3:00 pm – 4:30 pm

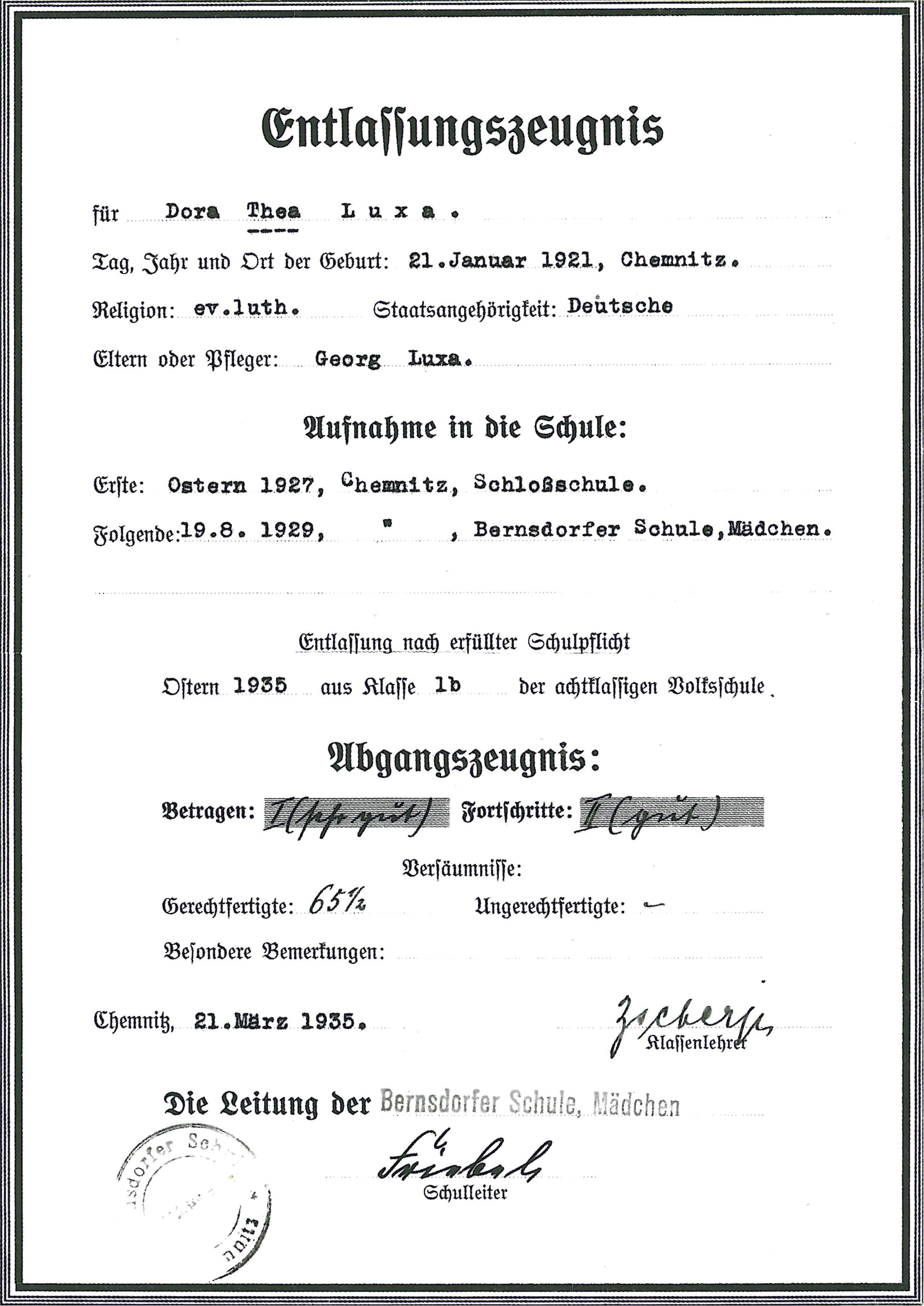
diploma of a student at former Bernsdorf school in 1935

The secondary school offers 24 classes taught from 5th through 12th grade. 46 teachers educate 666 students in 35 classes. Each class has its own class teacher. If possible, classes do not get mixed and class teachers remain in the same class until 10th grade. Students have at least one class a week with their class teacher. After 10th grade, students have to select their advanced courses and classes are getting mixed by their choices. The Johann-Wolfgang-von-Goethe-Gymnasium offers six different advanced courses besides mathematics and German which are obligatory.

List of classes being taught at the school
Class	Taught in grades	References
Mathematics	5–12	
Physics	6–12	
Chemistry	7–12	
Biology	5–12	
Biology-Chemistry	11–12	elective class in secondary level II
Geography	5–12	elective class in secondary level II
Computer Science	7–8, 11–12	elective class in secondary level II
Handicrafts and Computers	5–6	
Astronomy	11–12	elective class in secondary level II
German	5–12	
English	5–12	
French	6–12	Students have to decide in 5th grade, which class they want to take, cannot be changed
Spanish	6–12	Students have to decide in 5th grade, which class they want to take, cannot be changed
Latin	8–12	Taught in linguistic oriented class, elective class in secondary level II
Profil	8–10	Scientific, linguistic, and social science oriented classes available; cannot be changed
Social Studies	9–10	elective class in secondary level II
History	5–12	
Music	5–12	Students have to take only one of these classes in secondary level II
Arts	5–12	Students have to take only one of these classes in secondary level II
Ethics	5–12	Students have to take either or class, can be changed at the end of each school year
Lutheran / Catholic Religion	5–12	Students have to take either or class, can be changed at the end of each school year
Sports	5–12	Girls and boys taught separately

Green: available advanced courses (have to be approved by the ministry of education and cultural affairs), students are required to select German or mathematics and one other advanced course in secondary level II. Students have to choose 2 elective classes in secondary level II

== Extracurricular activities ==
The Johann-Wolfgang-von-Goethe-Gymnasium offers a variety of 22 different extracurricular activities for students. All leisure facilities are held by teachers, students, or external educators and are voluntary. Most activities are offered once a week (on week days) and take place at the school building. The activities are scheduled in the afternoon and usually start after the 7th or 8th class period.

List of extracurricular activities being offered at the Johann-Wolfgang-von-Goethe-Gymnasium
Name	Grade(s)	instructor	Short description
(Electro technical) model making	5–7	Ms. Klausnitzer	Production of small, working models, e.g. solar windmill Easy Soldering workings
Creative statures	5–7	Ms. Steinigen	Introduction to various handcraft techniques
Speed Stacking	5–8	Ms. Neuhaus	Stacking of specialized plastic cups in specific sequences in as little time as possible
Chess	5–8	Mr. Steudtmann (chess coach)	Learning and Practicing chess
Aquarium	5–8	Ms. Klausing	Water analysis Structure and maintenance of the school aquarium
Mini Zoo	5–10	Ms. Otto	Introduction and Nursing of the animals at the mini zoo
Self-defense	5–12	Mr. Müller	Learning of self-defense techniques and de-escalation strategies
Costume tailoring and set design	6–12	Ms. Münzer	Production of costumes (Sewing) and set sceneries
Drama	6–8	Ms. Düber (professional actor)	Practice and Presentation of a play with corresponding costumes and requisites
Handicrafts and ceramics	6–11	Ms. Drews	Production of pottery and statuaries
Russian for beginners and advanced students	7–12	Ms. Arnold	Learning of the Russian language and culture
School radio	7–12	Mr. Langer	Radio played during recess
Schülerpatenteam	8–10	Ms. Pießler	
Photography	8–12	Mr. Riedel	Learning of principals of digital and analogue photography Creation of black and white photo prints in the photo laboratory
Dyslexia remediation	5–12	Ms. Skurt	support of students with dyslexia to improve their reading and writing skills
French for beginners	5	Ms. Bragulla	Learning of the basics of the French language and culture
Homework care and relaxation	5–6	Ms. Landeck	assistance with homework and learning of relaxation methods
Think and act democratically	10–12	Ms. Dalljo	Learning of democratic principles and how to use in everyday life
Reading corner	5–12	Ms. Barth; Mr. Michalsky	Reading books from the library and talking about them with others
Flag Football	8–12	Mr. Pohl	Learning the rules and playing flag football in a team
School club	5–12	Ms. Klausnitzer; Ms. Ludwig	play, eat and help out in the school club
Stock exchange ABC	9–12	Mr. Freytag	Learning of the basics to international trade and stock markets

=== Student company S-GmbH GoetheMedia ===
The Johann-Wolfgang-von-Goethe-Gymnasium has a company that is run by students. Its main purpose is to offer students who are interested in computer sciences a possibility to extend their knowledge and to work in a team. Being founded in 1997, the company started off with only a few computers and was named "WebDesignStudio". The next years, the student company mainly focused on web design and programming computer games and software. In 2005, the field of programming was being terminated and "Senioren ans Netz", a computer class for elder people started. Over the next years, GoetheMedia became well known in Chemnitz because of various appearances in TV shows and newspaper articles. At the moment, the student company consists of 12 members with Jasmin Herzog as chief executive officer and Mr. Yannic Warias as deputy chief executive.

=== Booster club ===
The booster club of the high school, named "Freunde des Johann-Wolfgang-von-Goethe-Gymnasiums Chemnitz e.V." is a non-profit organization that supports the school and its students. In 1993, the booster club was founded and consisted of 60 members who established three basic principles because of missing financial support by the commune:

1. Financial and material support of the high school
2. Financial and material support of students
3. Preservation of public relations

The yearbook is being pre-financed and published by the booster club as well. The organization honors students with outstanding educational achievements at the end of each school year with certificates and gift coupons. The notion is to motivate students while the award has more of an ideational than a material character. Another award is given to students who improve their grades from first to second semester significantly. The "Goethe Taler" (a ceramics statuary) is awarded to the student with the highest GPA in 12th grade by a celebrated character from Chemnitz.

List of prizes awarded to students and their criteria
Grade(s)	criteria	award
5 - 10	First and second best in each class, GPA of 1.7 or lower, no grade 4, general conduct of 2 or better	Certificate and gift coupon
11	GPA of 12.5 point or higher (equal to GPA of 1.5 or lower)	Certificate and gift coupon
12	Valedictorian	Certificate, Goethe-Taler and gift coupon

=== The GAPP ===
Since 1999 the Johann-Wolfgang-von-Goethe-Gymnasium has taken part in the German American Partnership Program (GAPP). The GAPP supports long-term school partnerships between schools in the United States of America and Germany. The first partner school of the Johann-Wolfgang-von-Goethe-Gymnasium was the Mt. Spokane High School in Mead, Washington. The Partnership ended in 2005.

In 2006, the Johann-Wolfgang-von-Goethe-Gymnasium began its partnership with the Fargo North High School in Fargo, North Dakota. Between the two schools students exchanges of small student groups take place regularly every other year. Since the beginning of the partnership four visits and four return visits have taken already place.

The exchanges are about four weeks long. During the first three weeks the exchange students stay in host families and have to attend classes at the partner school. The remaining days the students and their accompanying teachers spend in a big city like New York City or Chicago.

== Alumnus ==
After 12th grade, students graduate from high school and receive their diplomas at a ceremony. Since the school became a secondary school in 1992, the Johann-Wolfgang-von-Goethe-Gymnasium had 14 students with an average of 1.0:

Year	Name(s)
1994	Marion Heyer
1996	Kay Vetterlein, Christiane Scholz
2000	René Ahlendorf, Sebastian Liebold
2003	Max Hoffmann
2004	Tina Schweigler
2006	Markus Neumann
2007	Ulrike Meier, Vivien Röder, Melissa Weiß
2009	Tom Bachmann, Robin Bothmann, Anne Marschner

The Johann-Wolfgang-von-Goethe-Gymnasium offers an online database with information of students who graduated from the school. It is possible to enter name, surname, final year, e-mail-address, and phone number and browse through existing information. All entries are voluntary.
