= Arctic-Alpine Garden of the Walter Meusel Foundation =

Nonprofit botanical garden in Saxony, Germany

Coordinates: 50.8875°N 12.9399°E

Arktisch-Alpiner Garten der Walter-Meusel-Stiftung
- Interactive map of Arktisch-Alpiner Garten der Walter-Meusel-Stiftung
- Type: Botanical garden
- Location: Schmidt-Rottluff-Straße 90, Chemnitz, Saxony, Germany
- Area: 2,800 m^{2} (30,000 sq ft)
- Opened: 1956
- Founder: Walter Meusel
- Operator: Walter Meusel Foundation
- Open: Daily except Sunday
- Species: ~6,000
- Collections: Willows (Salix), Ericaceae, Ferns (Pteridophyta), Saxifragaceae, New Zealand mountain plants, Himalayan plants

The Arktisch-Alpiner Garten der Walter-Meusel-Stiftung (2,800 m^{2}) is a nonprofit botanical garden specializing in arctic and alpine plants. It is maintained by the Walter Meusel Foundation at Schmidt-Rottluff-Straße 90, Chemnitz, Saxony, Germany, and open daily except Sunday.

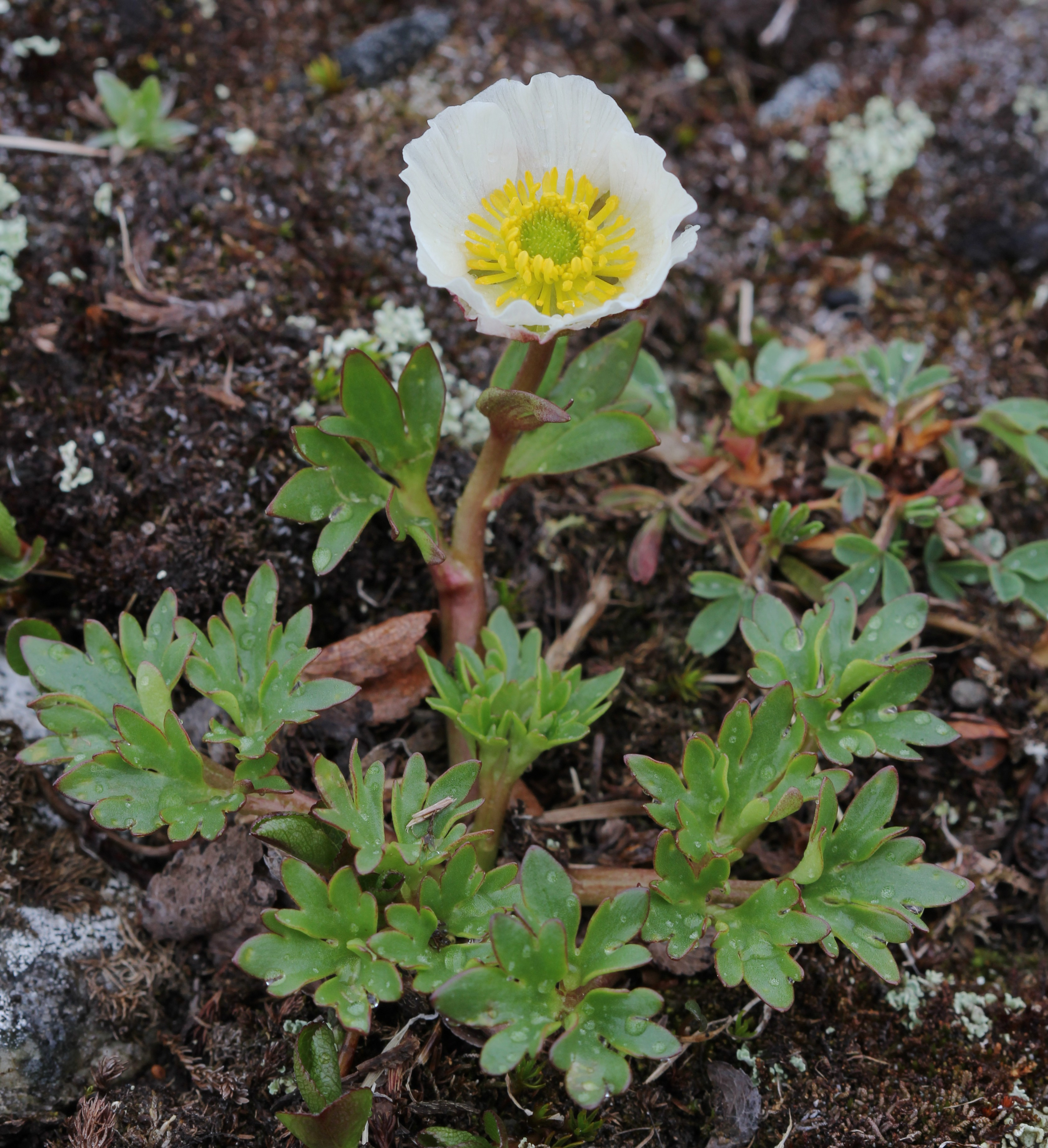

The Arctic-Alpine Garden was founded in 1956 by Walter Meusel, a musician, composer, and author of zoological and botanical books. After his death in 1990, the Walter Meusel Foundation has continued to preserve the garden and perform botanical research and conservation.

Today the garden contains approximately 6,000 plant species with a focus on cold and mountainous regions. It maintains notable collections of willows (Salix), Ericaceae, ferns (Pteridophyta) and mountain plants of New Zealand, as well as good collections of Saxifragaceae and plants from the Himalayas, East Asia, North and South America, the Caucasus, the Alps, and several European low mountain ranges.

== See also ==
- Botanischer Garten Chemnitz
- List of botanical gardens in Germany
