= Franziskanerkloster (Dresden) =

Coordinates: 51°03′05″N 13°44′03″E

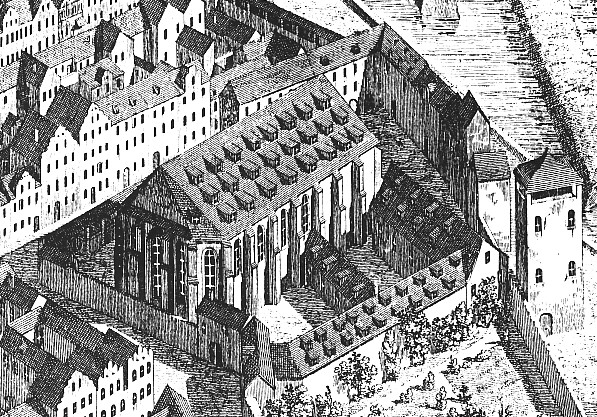
The Franziskanerkloster in 1555

The Franziskanerkloster or Barfüßerkloster was a Franciscan monastery in Dresden founded in 1272. Its church (with its associated Busmannkapelle) later became the Sophienkirche.

== History ==
The monastery was a foundation of Henry III, Margrave of Meissen. Since in 1265 in Dresden a provincial chapter of the Saxon Order Province led by the provincial superior, Brother Bartholomew, took place, the monastery of the Franciscan order founded in 1210 must have already existed at that time. An exact founding date is not known, however, researchers date the foundation to between 1240 and shortly before 1265.
