= Busmannkapelle =

Church in Dresden, Germany

Coordinates: 51°03′05″N 13°44′06″E

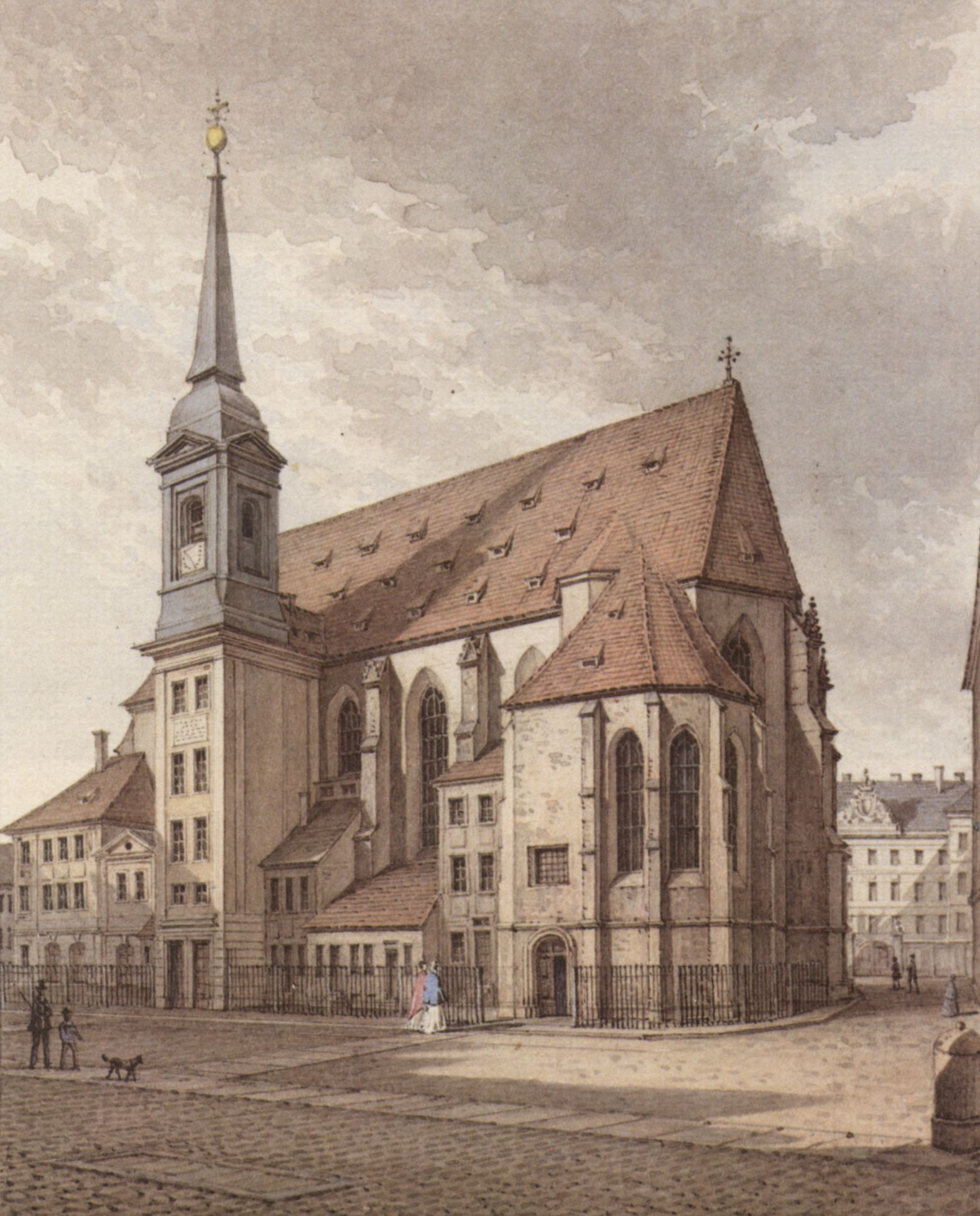
Christian Gottlob Hammer: Sophienkirche, watercolour 1852. The Busmannkapelle and its entrance can be seen in the foreground.

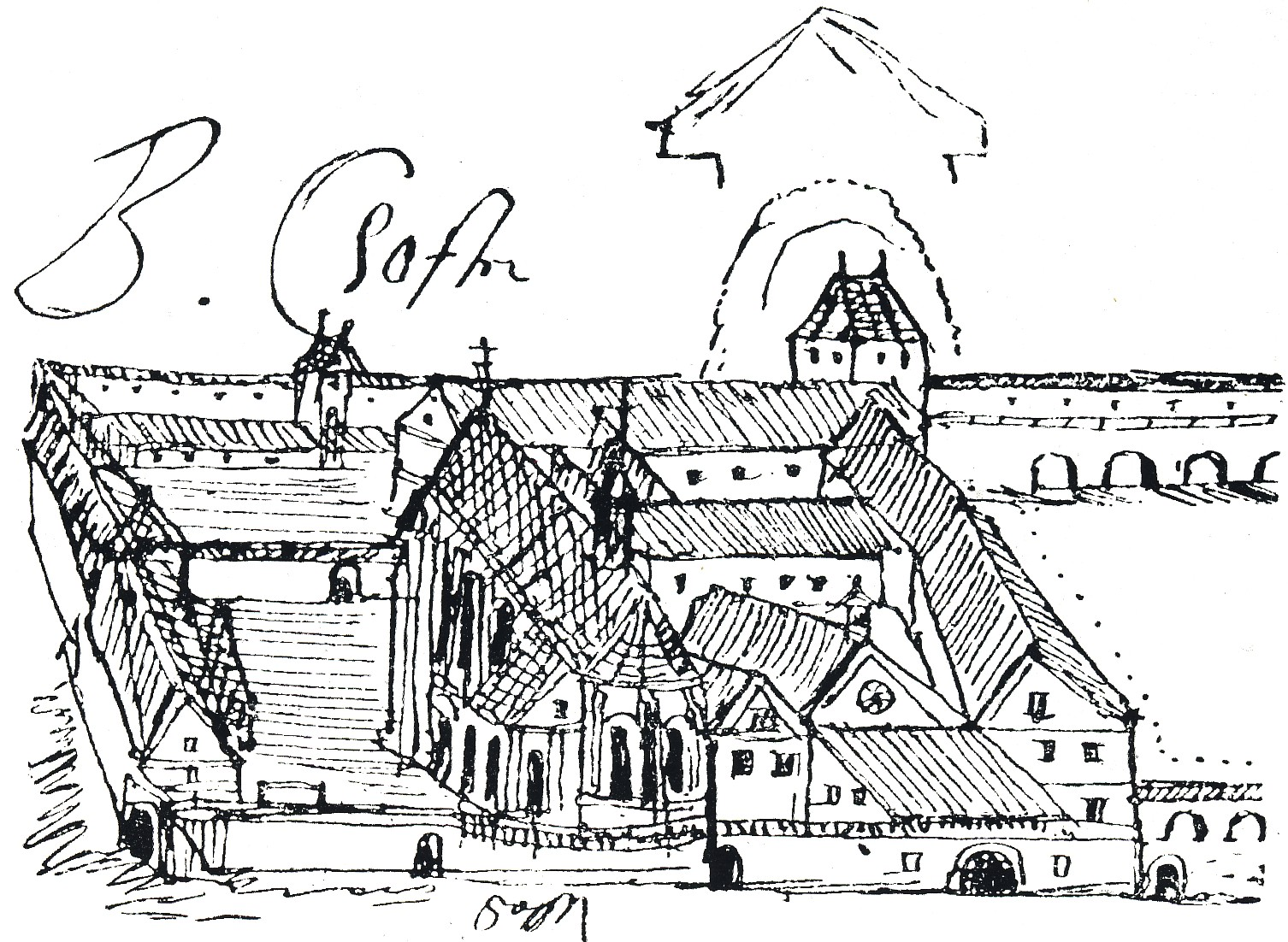
Franciscan monastery, with Sophienkirche and Busmannkapelle in the center. Dating from mit-16th century

The Busmannkapelle was a side chapel of the Sophienkirche in Dresden. The chapel was built in 1400 when the Sophienkirche was still part of the city's Franciscan monastery. It was funded by the patrician Busmann family, who used it as a family and funerary chapel and after whom it was named. It was destroyed in February 1945 during the bombing of Dresden in World War II, but in 1994 plans were instigated to reconstruct the chapel on the same site as the Busmannkapelle Memorial, as a memorial to the church as a whole.

== See also ==
- Nosseni epitaph
