= Loschwitz Church =

Church building in Loschwitz, Germany

The Loschwitz Church is a baroque church in the Loschwitz district of Dresden. It was the first church built by the architect of the Dresden Frauenkirche, George Bähr. The churchyard, which was used as a cemetery until 1907, is one of the few 18th-century churchyards in Saxony that is still in its original state and is the smallest cemetery in the city at about 400 square meters. The Loschwitz church and cemetery are under monument protection.

== History ==
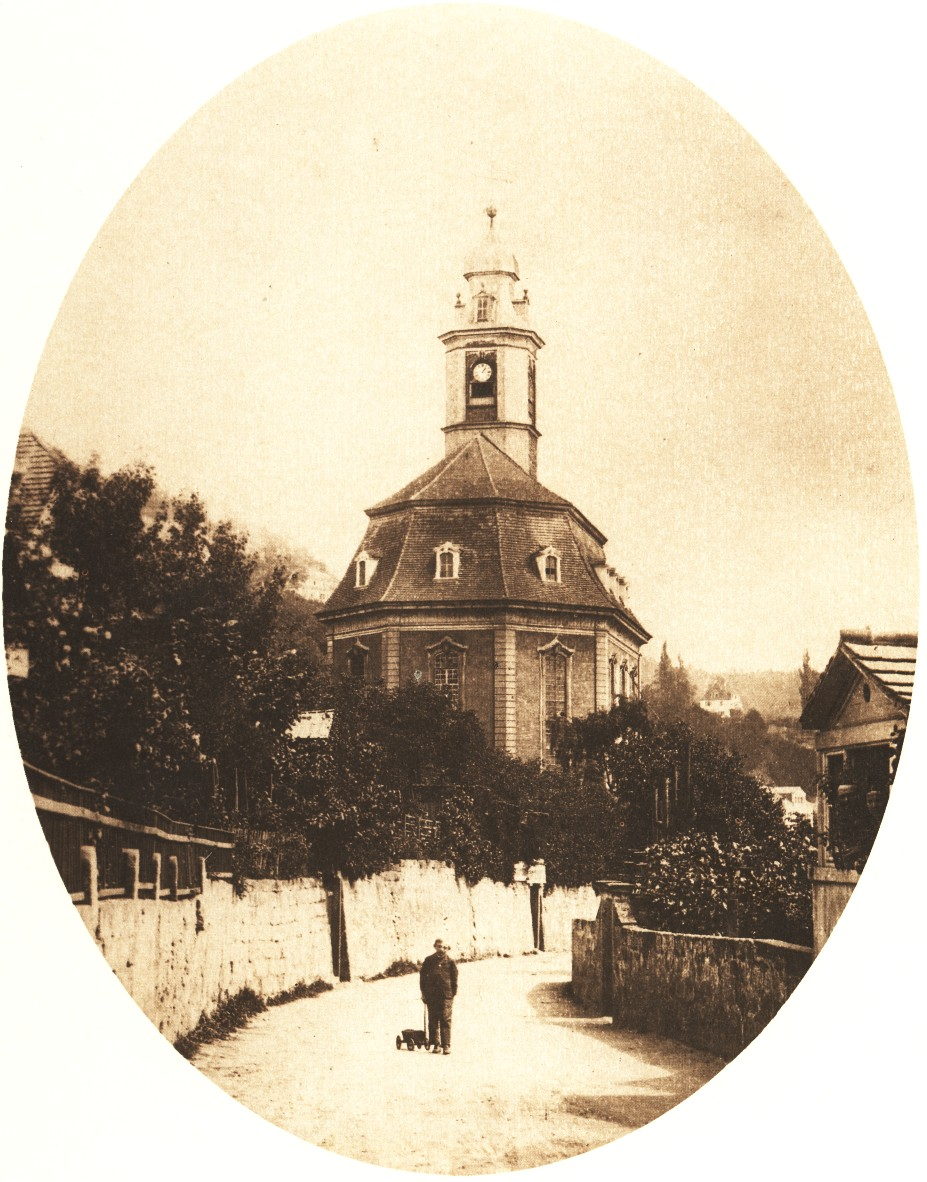
August Kotzsch - The Loschwitz church around 1875

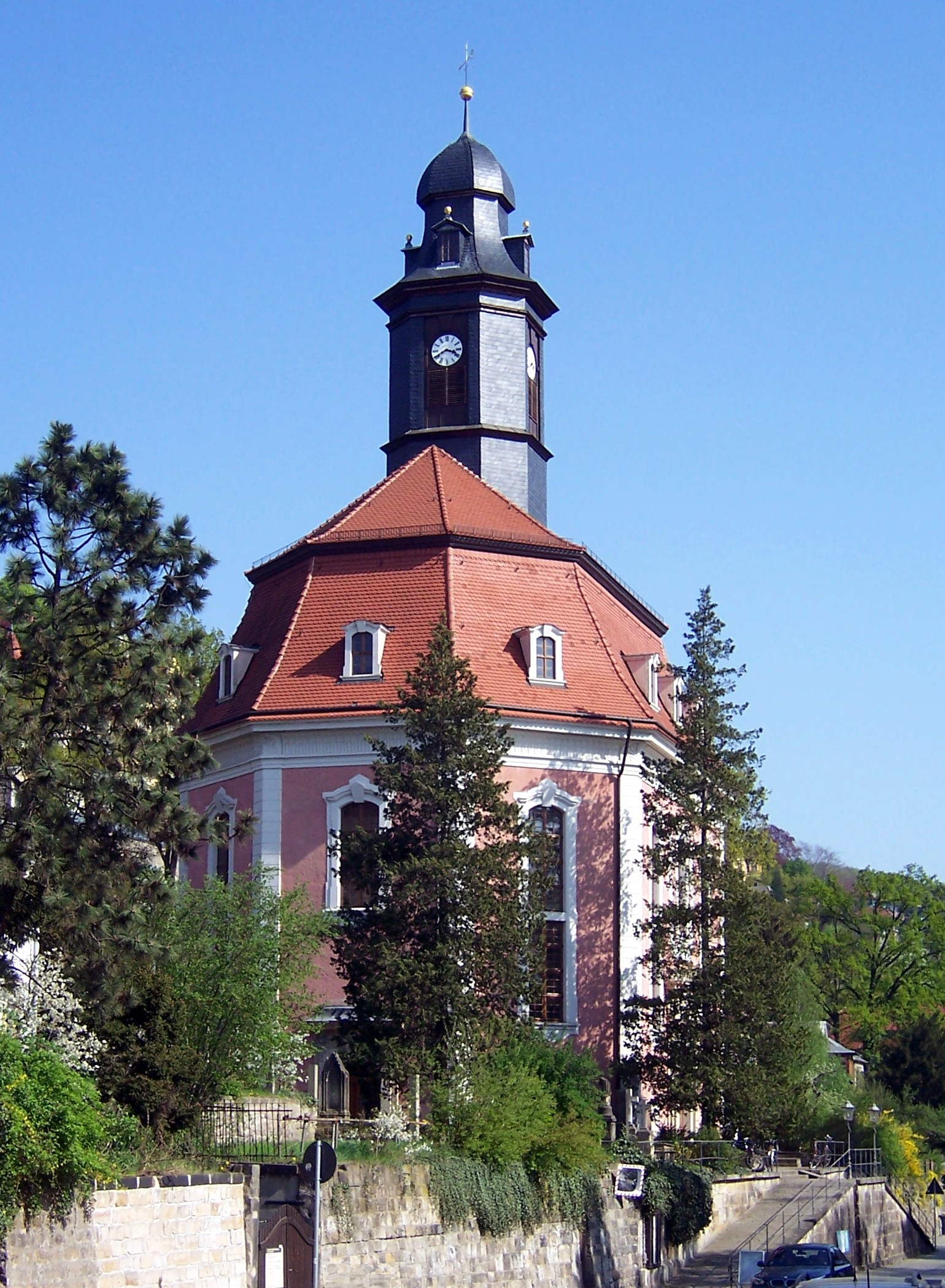
The Loschwitz Church 2009

=== The situation before the Loschwitz church was built ===
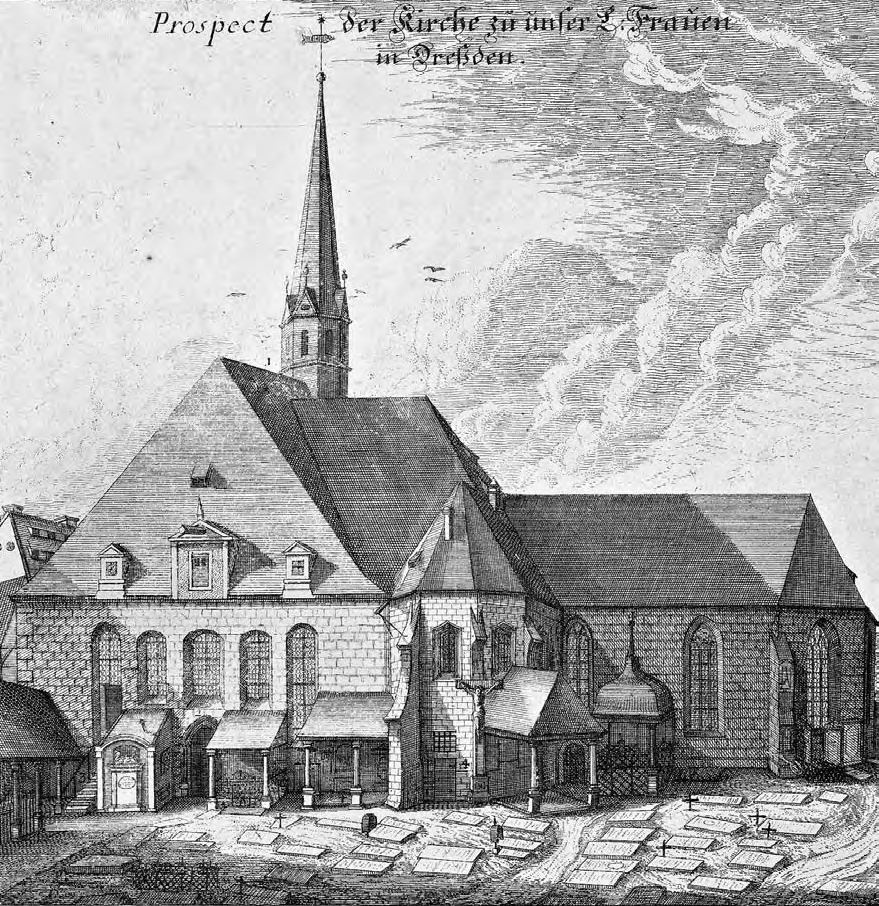
The church "Zu unserer Lieben Frauen", a place of worship for the village of Loschwitz until 1704; undated copperplate engraving by Moritz Bodenehr

Loschwitz was first documented in 1315 as Loscuicz. With the expansion of the originally Slavic rundling, the lands were already subject to the Materni Hospital in Dresden in the 14th century. Together with 25 other villages, Loschwitz belonged to the parish of the church "Zu unserer Lieben Frauen", the original parish of the later Frauenkirche, which was located near the Maternihospital between the present Dresden Frauenkirche and the Coselpalais. The inhabitants of Loschwitz always had to go to the parish, which was several kilometers away, for services, confessions, or weddings, which was especially difficult in winter. Baptisms took place in the Kreuzkirche. The dead of the village of Loschwitz were buried in the Frauenkirchhof and, from 1571, in the old Johanniskirchhof.

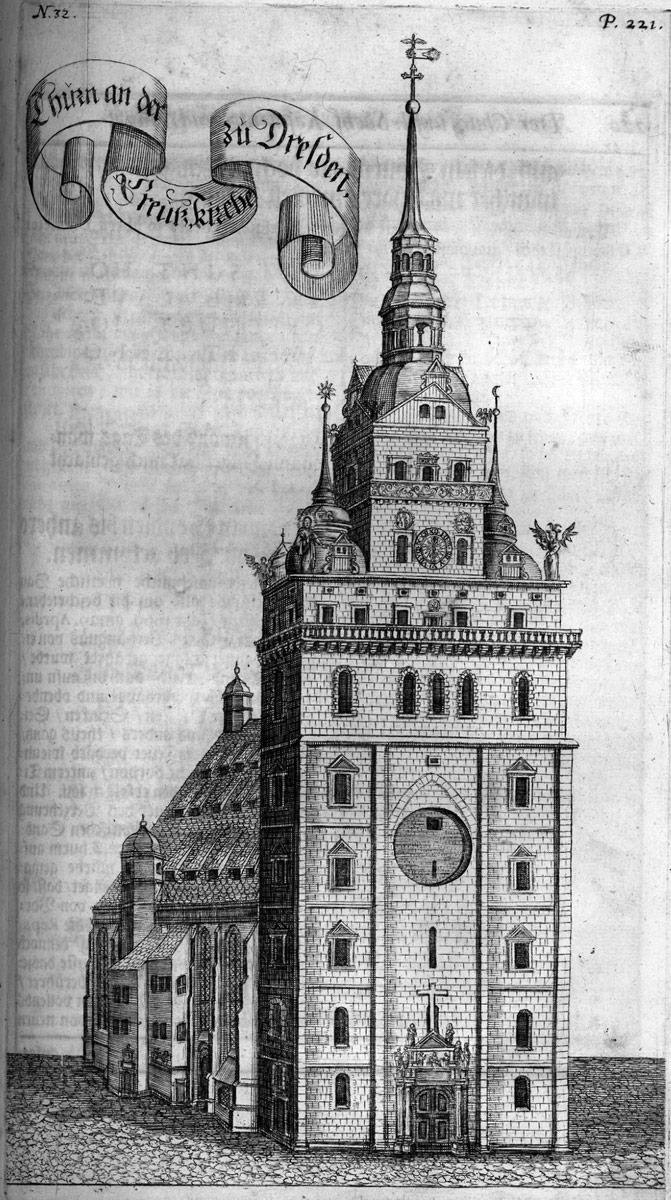
The old Kreuzkirche, the baptistery of Loschwitz until 1704

After the end of the Thirty Years' War in the Electorate of Saxony following the armistice of Kötzschenbroda in 1645, Saxony experienced an economic and cultural boom. As the population of Dresden and the villages belonging to the Dresden Frauenkirche parish grew steadily, services in the medieval Frauenkirche became almost impossible due to overcrowding. It was not uncommon for Loschwitz parishioners to be "forced out of the Kirche zur lieben Frauen and directed to the nave of the small old Frauenkirche" when church attendance was unusually high. At the same time, the pastor of the Frauenkirche parish could only visit the surrounding villages for a limited time because Dresden, as a fortress city, kept its gates closed in the evenings. "It was often impossible to reach the pastor late or early in the day or at night to administer Holy Communion to the sick or dying, to perform emergency baptisms, to bring comfort to the seriously ill, and the like.

In December 1702, the villages of Loschwitz and Wachwitz requested to the Dresden Council, and again in 1703 the Superior Papal consistory and the Elector to be parished away from the Frauenkirche. After a "reading service" in a schoolhouse in Loschwitz had been approved, which a schoolmaster had been holding on Sundays and holidays in the school building in Loschwitz since 1702, Augustus the Strong in 1704, agreed to the congregation and thus the founding of a Loschwitz parish. In addition to Loschwitz, the nearby village of Wachwitz and the inn and property "Zum Weißen Hirsch" also belonged to the municipality.

The Dresden City Council was granted the right of patronage over the parish and was therefore responsible for financing and building a church. It also appointed the pastor. On April 4, 1704, Johann Arnold was appointed as the first pastor of the new parish and confirmed on September 21, 1704. As a parish, the construction of a church could now begin.

=== The construction of the Loschwitz church ===
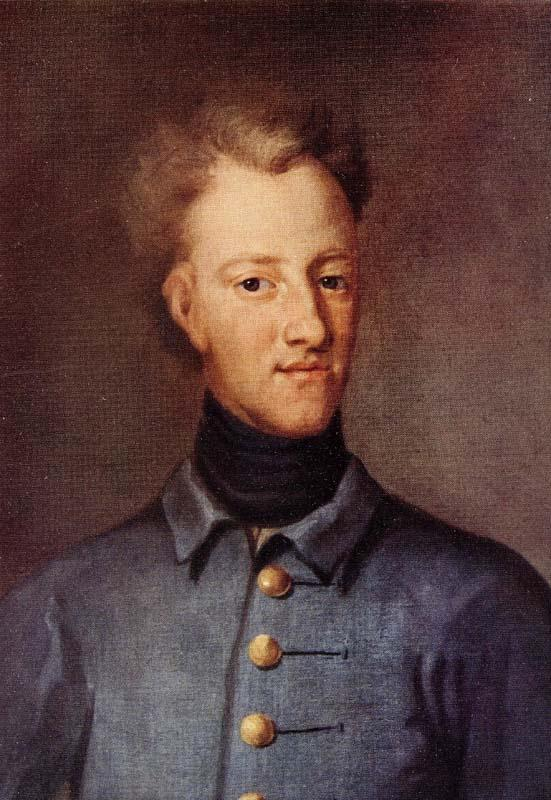
King Charles XII of Sweden in a painting by David von Krafft from 1706, the year he protected the Loschwitz Church from destruction during the Northern War.

In 1704, the carpenter George Bähr was commissioned to design the church. He carried out the project together with the master mason Johann Christian Fehre, and the ground plan of the church underwent several changes. As early as March 3, 1704, the congregation had the first stones for the church unloaded at the "Bachhorn" in Pirna and stored over the winter in the schoolhouse in Loschwitz. The schoolhouse was located at the crossing of Körnerplatz and Pillnitzer Landstraße, right in the center of the village where the Loschwitz congregation wanted the church to be built. Against the wishes of the community, the Dresden City Council chose the "Materni vineyard" of the Materni Hospital, about 150 meters away and owned by the City Council, as the site for the church. Unlike the village center, the site on the eastern edge of the village on the road to Wachwitz was safe from flooding, and the vineyard was deliberately chosen as a Christian motif. "The actual construction work did not begin until April 27, 1705, when the master mason Fehre from Dresden sent 6 masons to cut and set the stones, including his son Johann Gottfried.

On May 14, 1705, the first church fathers of the new parish and men from the city parish, the district parish, and Wachwitz, ceremoniously surrounded the site of the new church and sang three hymns ("I call to you, Lord Jesus Christ", "In Thee, Lord, have I put my trust", "May God be gracious to us"). Then the grapevine poles were pulled up, the grapevines were dug out, and the foundation of the church was dug. On June 29, 1705, the foundation stone of the Loschwitz Church was laid in the presence of the Princely Commissioner, Count Friedrich von Schönberg, accompanied by the Dresdner Kreuzchor. The foundation stone was accompanied by a copper box containing the Augsburg Confession, Luther's catechism, a sketch of the building to be constructed, and the history of the town written on parchment. The building itself was carried out in the following years by the Dresden councilman and master builder Johann Siegmund Küffner, who was also responsible for hiring the workers.

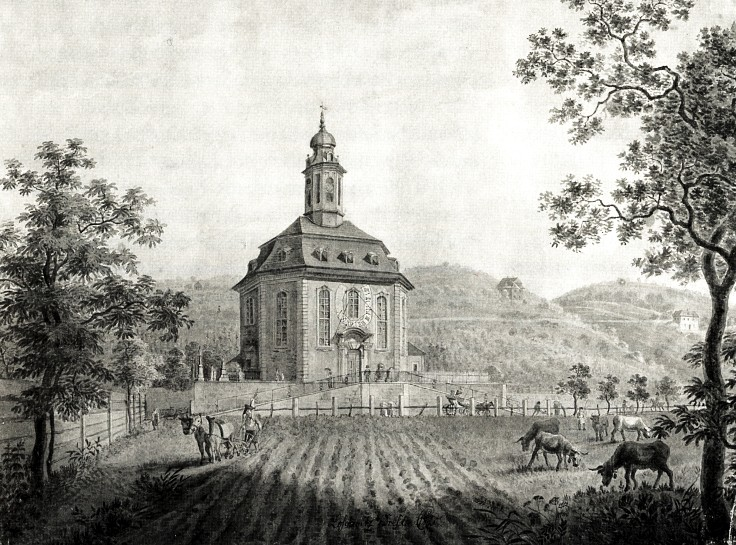
The Loschwitz Church around 1820

In 1706 the construction of the church, whose foundation walls were already standing, was interrupted when the Swedish army invaded Saxony during the Great Northern War. As a result, the inhabitants of Loschwitz and the builders fled. The Dresden City Council instructed Johann Arnold, who had been appointed parish priest of Loschwitz in 1704, to petition the King of Sweden to spare the church building. Together with the church fathers of Loschwitz and Wachwitz, Arnold went to Radeberg, where Charles XII was encamped with his army, and had the petition of the parish delivered to him. Count Carl Piper, the king's advisor, finally told the small delegation:

"His most gracious King and Lord would not have harmed any Catholic church in Poland, so much less would He harm a Lutheran church and its building materials, or allow it to be harmed; one should continue to build in God's name, and not a chip should be damaged in this building, and if one or another wanted to tamper with it, one should only refer to this answer."

— Pohle, 1883,

In September 1706, the King of Sweden promised safety to the craftsmen, and construction resumed. Another break followed on May 1, 1707, when there was no money for further construction due to Swedish raids. Again, construction was resumed the same month after Arnold's intervention. On August 3, 1708, the name day of Augustus the Strong, the Loschwitz church was consecrated. The result was an octagonal, baroque hall building with a striking dusky pink plaster on the outside, but rather plain on the inside. Two years later the builders completed the exterior of the churchyard.

=== The renovation of 1898/99 ===
In the years that followed, the church underwent several minor renovations, with the Leibner organ, built in 1753, requiring repeated maintenance. At the end of the 19th century, the equipment and the basic standard of the church, which largely corresponded to the original building from 1708, were no longer up to date. There was no indoor plumbing, nor was there a gas line that could have been used to light candlesticks, for example. After much deliberation, the congregation "finally decided to combine all the needs into one large and thorough renovation, excluding all repair work for many decades, and complete it all at once. The Loschwitz architect Karl Emil Scherz supervised the renovation of the church in 1898 and 1899. The rather plain interior was adorned with gold decorations and ornaments. Stained glass was added to the long windows, and new pews and altar additions were made. While the interior was painted olive green, the facade was painted gray instead of the original dusky pink. The reconsecration of the Loschwitz church took place on March 12, 1899. Apart from minor renovations - for example, two bells melted down during World War I and had to be replaced - the Loschwitz church remained unchanged until 1945.

=== Destruction of the church in 1945 and reconstruction ===
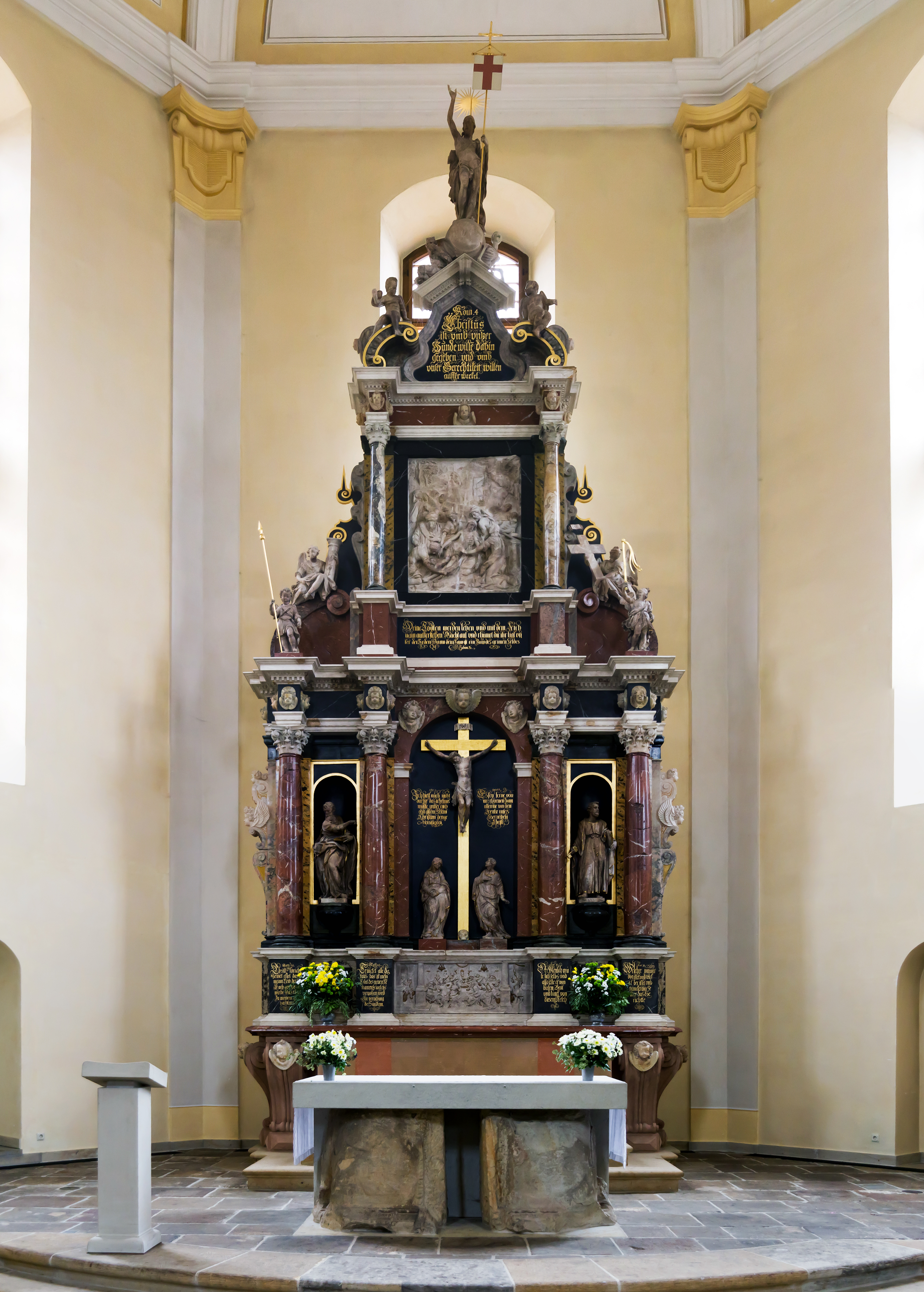
The restored Nosseni altar from the ruins of the St. Sophia church was consecrated in the Loschwitz church in 2002

During the air raids on Dresden on February 13 and 14, 1945, several bombs hit the Loschwitz Church. As a result, it burned down to the surrounding walls. By 1946, the ruins had been cleared of rubble, and in 1947, security measures were taken on the remaining surrounding walls. Already in 1946, and again in 1950, a "Committee for the Reconstruction of the Church" was formed to make the necessary preparations. Its members chose Oskar Menzel and Herbert Burkhardt as architects, but there was a lack of funds and building materials. "The wood donated by the Evangelical Lutheran Church of Finland in 1963 could not be imported until a building permit was issued. But this was denied because the necessary building materials were not available." For the city of Dresden, the reconstruction of the Dreikönigskirche and the Matthäuskirche took priority at that time.

In 1967 the preserved sacristy was repaired and transformed into a functional church hall. The first services were held in the ruins. The "young congregation" also erected a temporary bell tower and in 1969 had it equipped with three new bells from Apolda. On May 31, 1978, the church ruins and the church cemetery were placed under monumental protection by the district council.

Since the masonry had been damaged by the effects of weather over the years, discussions about rebuilding the Loschwitz Church resumed in the 1980s under the auspices of the "Reconstruction Committee" founded in 1984. In 1989, the Regional Church Office in Saxony approved the reconstruction under certain conditions: the construction work and costs were to be borne by the parish; "donations in convertible currency" were strictly prohibited. In Munich, on July 29, 1989, Pastor Ullrich Wagner founded the "Association for the Reconstruction of the Evangelical Church in Dresden-Loschwitz e. V.", which collected donations. In November 1989 the beginning of the reconstruction was officially announced. The symbolic laying of the foundation stone took place on June 29, 1991. In the following years, the reconstruction was financed mainly by donations: In addition to the funds of the Munich Association, the German Foundation for Monument Protection, the Körber Foundation, the Dresdner Bank, the Regional Council, and numerous private individuals supported the reconstruction. Dresden artists such as Theo Adam, Peter Schreier, and Udo Zimmermann also contributed with benefit concerts. The topping-out ceremony took place on October 3, 1992. The architects based the exterior design on the original building from 1708, for example, the plaster of the church building is once again a dusky pink. At the same time, they corrected George Bähr's structural mistakes in the roof structure. The exterior renovation of the church was completed on October 2, 1994, with the reconsecration of the Loschwitz Church.

The interior work followed. Shortly before the church was consecrated in 1994, the Hanover parish of St. Johannis donated the old pews from the renovated Neustädter Kirche to the Loschwitz Church. In addition to a temporary altar, the two galleries were built by 1997 so that the new Wegscheider organ could be consecrated on October 5, 1997. The new baptismal font and lectern were created by the Dresden artist Peter Makolies. The old pulpit altar was too damaged to be restored. In 2002, the Nosseni Altar from the Dresden Sophienkirche, which was destroyed in 1945 and demolished in 1963, found a new home in the Loschwitz Church. To match the colors of the altar, the interior of the church was painted yellow with white highlights in 2004. From 2004 to 2009, the Loschwitz Church was part of the Dresden Elbe Valley cultural landscape between the castles of Übigau and Pillnitz and was listed as a UNESCO World Heritage Site.

== Building description ==
=== Exterior ===
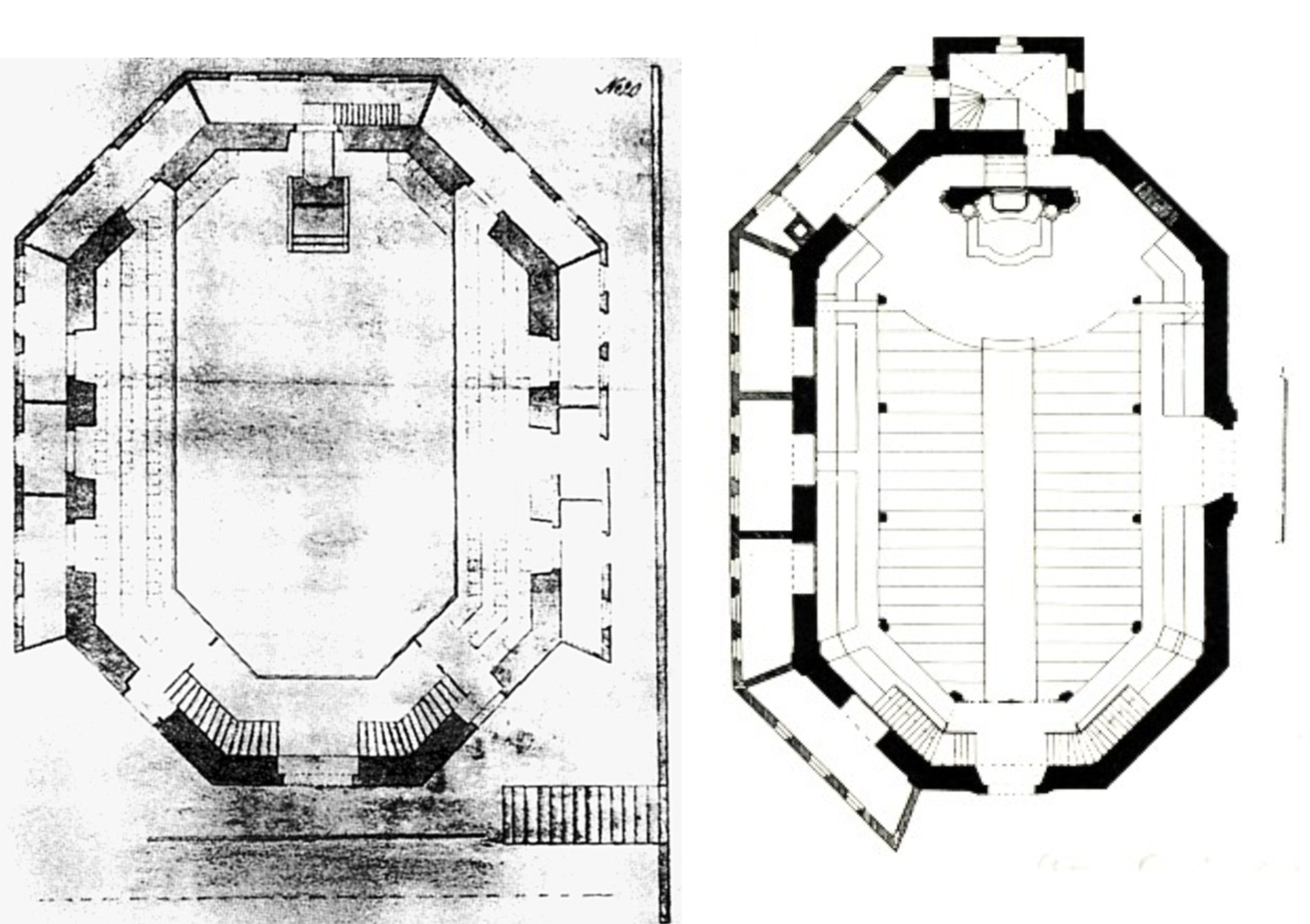
On the left is the wider basic design, and on the right is the narrower building that was realized.

The exterior of the Loschwitz Church clearly stands out from the simple village churches of the time. In keeping with the Baroque central building, it was designed as an octagonal but elongated hall. A surviving design shows that the Loschwitz Church was originally shorter and wider and would therefore have corresponded more to the regular octagon of a typical Baroque central building. The only entrance would have been on the west side of the church, all other sides would have been surrounded by prayer rooms. The design would have stood in the same location as the actual building, which was about 2.5 meters above the road that was already built at the time. Access to the site was therefore planned as an asymmetrical staircase. It is not known how the exterior of this church was planned. "The reason why the design was not carried out was probably that the foundation work would have been too difficult on the sloping terrain. That is probably why the octagon was narrowed". Including the sacristy, the Loschwitz Church is 27.7 meters long and 16.3 meters wide. The height without the weather vane is 41.5 meters.

In the finished design, the entrance is through the west portal on the side originally planned, which is still the main entrance to the church today. The keystone of the doorway bears the inscription Proximo datum (Hand over to your neighbor).

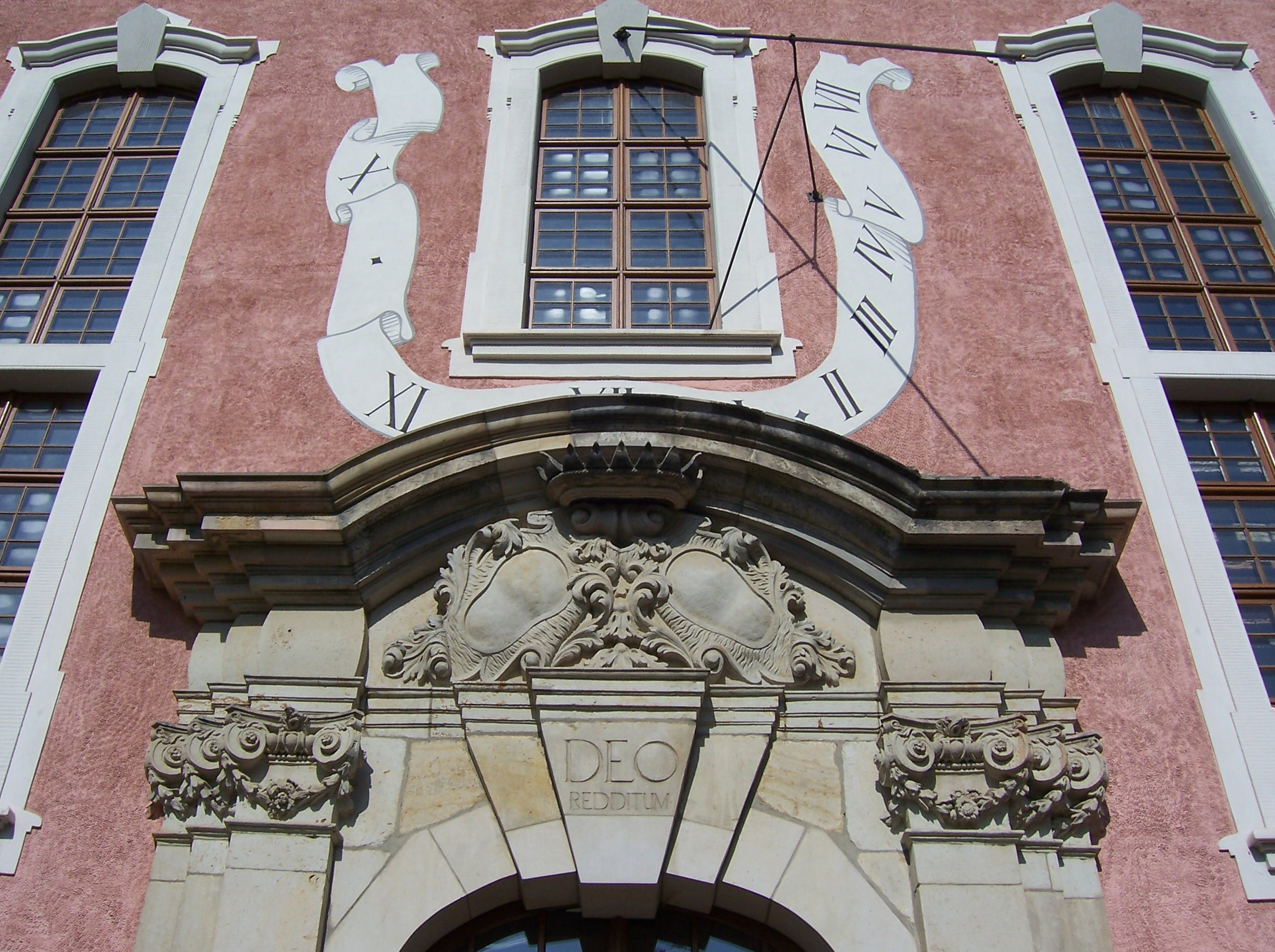
Decorated part of the southern main portal with a painted vertical sundial above

A second entrance to the nave is possible via the southern "obverse side" of the church facing the Elbe, which is richly decorated with the main portal. The main portal, made of plastered sandstone, is flanked by three Ionic pilasters leading to a hood mould. Between the keystone of the door frame, which bears the inscription DEO REDDITUM (Surrender to God), and the canopy, there are two typical Baroque unfilled cartouches surmounted by a simple crown.

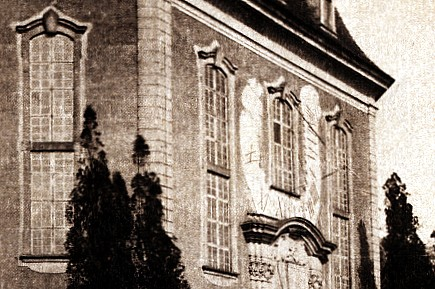
The original design of the sundial, detail from a photograph by August Kotzsch around 1895

Between the main portal and the window above it, there is a vertical sundial in the form of a looped white band, indicating the time from approximately 10 a.m. to 7 p.m. While the sundial in the white lime mortar was already present on the original building, during the restoration in 1898/99 it was "executed freehand in lime mortar and cement, preserving the old contour and thus giving it a three-dimensional effect". Parts of the clock, such as the numerals and markings, were probably gilded. The fire in the Loschwitz Church in 1945 destroyed about 50 percent of the sundial. Today's version is painted like the first sundial but with a different pattern. As can be seen from old documents, the drawing was originally not symmetrical but was higher on the right side than on the left. For this reason, the number "VIII" is missing from the current sundial. On the south side of the church is the one-story sacristy, accessible from the outside. On the north side of the church, there were also ground-floor prayer rooms in the original building.

Today, the building is plastered in the same dusky pink as in its original form; in the period between the renovation in 1898/99 and the destruction of the church in 1945, the exterior of the church was plastered in gray. The tall mullioned windows, divided in the middle, are accentuated by white plastered chambranle. The upper end has a small canopy with a highlighted keystone. The corners of the church are also whitewashed, reinforced with stone (called pilaster strips), and merged into a stylized acanthus leaf, which in turn is connected to the main cornice, also whitewashed. The steep gambrel roof of the church, which has nine skylights with whitewashed surrounds, is covered with red roof tiles. Next to it is the towering, almost a ridge turret, covered with slate and topped with a "Welsh hood" typical of George Bähr's buildings.

=== Interior ===
The interior of the church was simple, like a village church. In the nave, there were pews on either side of the central aisle reserved for the women of the congregation. Below the wooden galleries for the men, there were two rows of slightly raised pews where the vineyard owners sat with their families. Opposite the pulpit above the west portal, the patron's box was in the first gallery, and the organ and choir room were in the second gallery above. The parapet of the second gallery bore the inscription Sanctus Sanctus Sanctus Dominus Deus Zebaoth. In total, the Loschwitz church offered space for 820 worshippers.

The corners of the church were adorned with pilasters leading to volute capitals, followed by the mirrored vault. In the center was a plafond by Johann Gottlob Schieritz († 1738) depicting "The Praise of God" and framed in stucco.

After almost 200 years, the interior of the Loschwitz church was completely renovated by Karl Emil Scherz in 1898 and 1899. The pews, galleries and rows of pews of the vineyard owners were replaced by more modern furniture, although the principle of the two galleries was retained. The interior of the church was "darker, with less color and light, in keeping with the mood of the times". In addition to the dark pews, the interior was painted olive green.

=== Windows ===
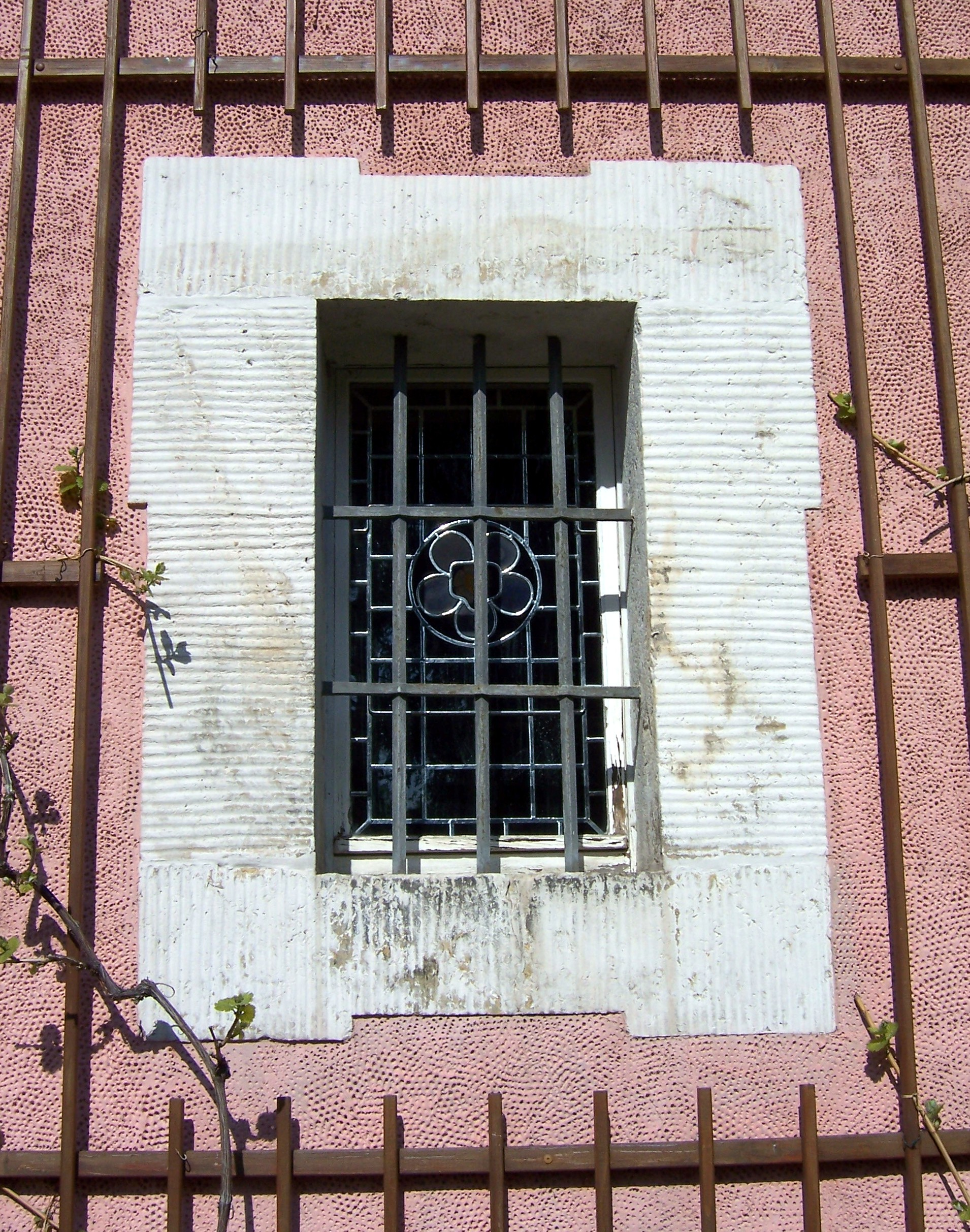
Sacristy windows with stained glass and glass painting

The original church building had windows with crown glass, which can still be found today, for example, in St. George's Church in Schwarzenberg, which was built at almost the same time. Beginning in 1807, the windows were replaced by inexpensive flat glass panes, which were eventually uniformly installed in wood-framed windows. By the time of the renovation in 1898/99, only three windows remained with the original crown glass.

During the renovation, all windows were fitted with leadlights by Urban & Goller. The two new altar windows were donated by the Loschwitz painter Eduard Leonhardi. Based on an idea by Leonhardi, the Loschwitz painter Georg Schwenk designed biblical motifs for both windows: "Trust in God was to be represented by Christ's prayer in the Garden of Gethsemane, and charity is represented by the Samaritan carrying out his merciful deed, and how this task was performed, worthily and effectively, brought joy not only to the Lord who commissioned it but also to the congregation who rejoiced in it." In addition to the altar windows, the remaining windows in the nave were also designed. Urban & Goller created ecclesiastical emblems in a simple matte color in the upper part of the window and a Bible verse below each. The nave windows were also equipped with opening devices.

All of the church's windows were destroyed in the 1945 bombing. Only two small fragments of stained glass were salvaged from the rubble. When the church was rebuilt, the stained glass windows were abandoned in favor of simple, small, wood-framed windows similar to those used by George Bähr in the Holy Trinity Church in Schmiedeberg. The windows in the sacristy, however, have stained glass and small stained glass windows.

=== Altar ===
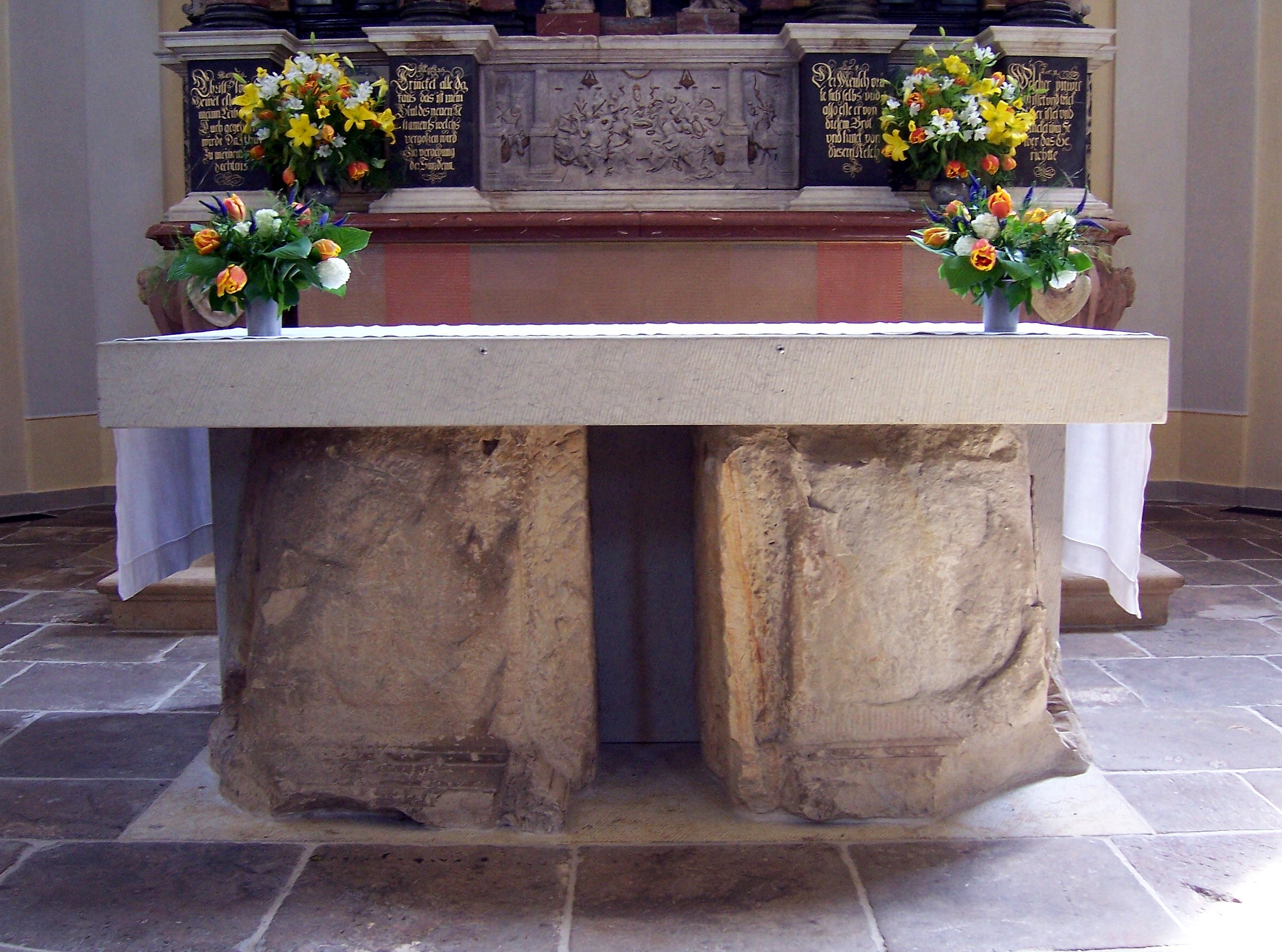
Refectory of the Loschwitz Church with parts of the old pulpit altar

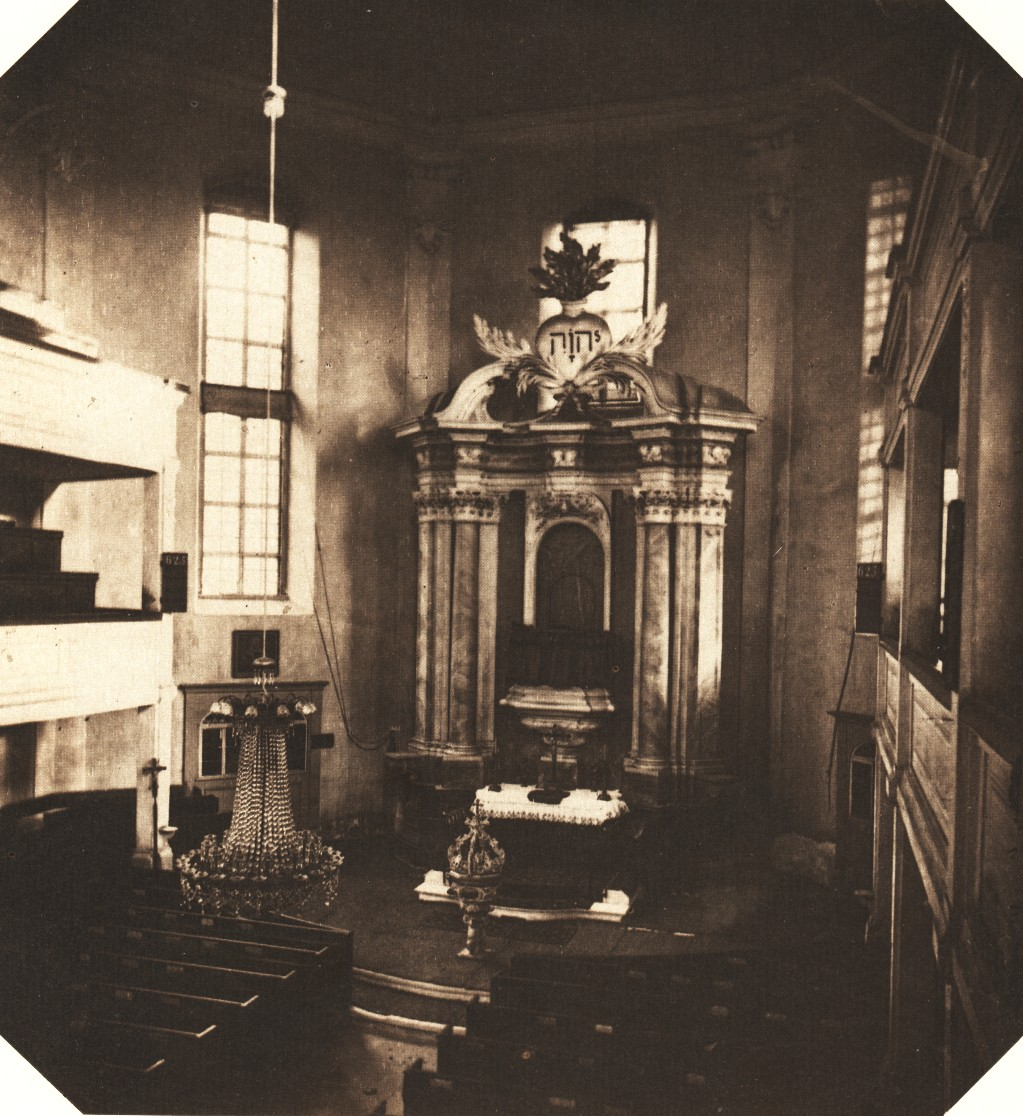
August Kotzsch - Interior of the Loschwitz Church around 1875

The sandstone altar, the first pulpit altar in the Dresden area, was the heart of the church. It was donated to the church by Councilman Küffner. The pulpit was framed by several pilasters and a Corinthian column on each side, which ended in a frieze with small angel heads. The pilasters and columns were made of scagliola, while the pulpit basket was made of wood, on which there was a relief with the image of the Veil of Veronica. Between the pulpit and the frieze was the figure of a dove opening its wings. On the pediment above the frieze was a flaming heart inscribed with the tetragram יְהֹוָה ("Jehowáh") and flanked by palm branches. Many of the interior furnishings, such as the baptismal font, crucifix, and baptismal font, as well as the priest's vestments and altar candlesticks, were donated by private individuals.

During the renovation at the end of the 19th century, the altar remained largely in its original state. Parts of the altar were gilded and the altar table was now supported by two marble columns. The choir was covered with marble slabs. The marble used for the renovation came from the Saalburg marble works. The tetragram on the flaming heart was replaced by the monogram of Christ, and the life-size statues of John and Paul of Tarsus, created by Robert Ockelmann, were placed on two pedestals on the altar, which had been unused since 1708.

The altar was also severely damaged by the church fire in 1945 and weathered over the following years to the point that it was partially removed in 1969 due to the risk of collapse. Reconstruction was not possible due to the severe deterioration. During the reconstruction of the church, the remaining altar base was removed. Parts of it were used as supports for a temporary altar table created by the sculptor Ole Göttsche in 1994. It still stands in front of the altar and has retained its function as a refectory.

On April 1, 1993, the Loschwitz parish applied to the Regional Church Office for the transfer of the Nosseni Altar from the Dresden Sophienkirche, which was destroyed in 1945 and demolished in 1963, to the Loschwitz church. The altar, made of alabaster, marble, and sandstone and designed in 1606/07, was at that time stored in about 350 individual pieces in various places in Dresden. Since the space for the installation of the altar was available, the reconstruction and restoration of the altar began in 1998. On October 6, 2002, the eleven meter high Nosseni Altar was solemnly consecrated in the Loschwitz Church.

=== Church decoration ===
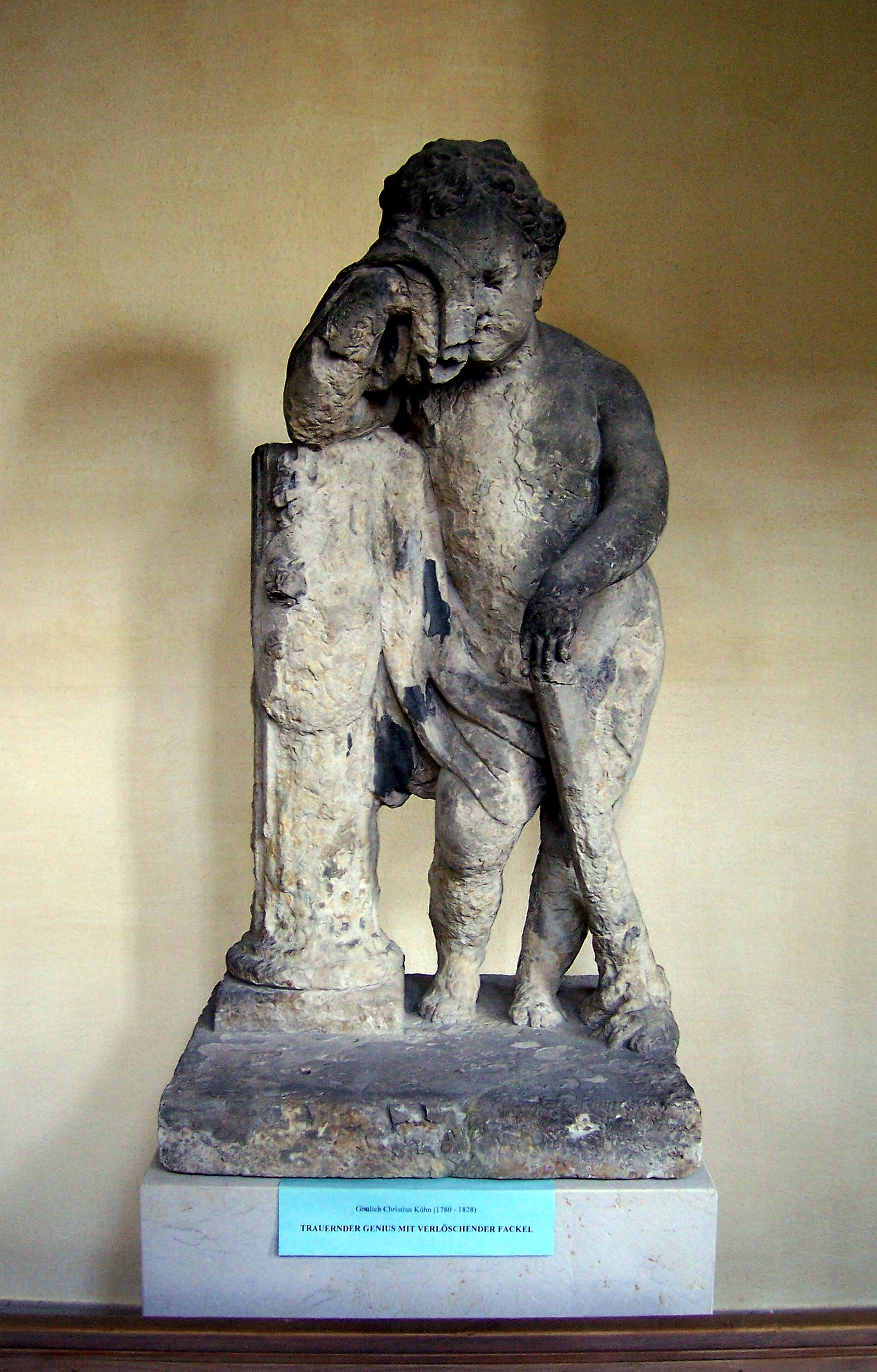
Christian Gottlieb Kühn's funerary figure of a mourning genius with an extinguishing torch in the Church of Loschwitz.

The interior of the church is austere and, except for the altar, almost unadorned. In his 1904 inventory of art and architectural monuments in Saxony, Cornelius Gurlitt mentioned two sandstone plaques, still in place behind the altar, which describe in Latin the events surrounding the construction of the church. Today, another sandstone plaque on the south wall of the church indicates that a foundation was established in 2004. The ceiling painting by Johann Schieritz disappeared during the renovation of the church in 1898/99 and was not replaced when the church was rebuilt.

In 1904 there were several paintings in the church, including a "Portrait of Melanchthon" (73 cm × 145 cm), which Gurlitt dated to the 17th century "after Lucas Cranach". A second, but heavily overpainted painting depicted the pastor Johann Arnold and measured 60 cm × 85 cm. Gurlitt makes no mention of a bust of Martin Luther that the parish had received from vineyard owner Gottlob Reintanz in 1846 and that had been on the north wall of the church since then, so it may have been removed during the renovation. The painting of the Crucified Christ (105 cm × 142 cm), dated by Cornelius Gurlitt to the second half of the 18th century and believed to be a copy by Anthonis van Dyck, was located in the sacristy and survived the bombing.

The first baptismal font was made of linden wood and had angels carrying a basket with the baptismal font. The lid was crown-shaped and decorated with garlands of flowers. There was a cross on the top. The first baptismal font was destroyed in 1945, while other church utensils were stored in the church vault and have been preserved, such as a pair of bronze chandeliers from 1709. In the 1990s, Dresden artist Peter Makolies created a lectern and a new baptismal font for the Loschwitz church. The simple bowl sits on a plain pedestal with a small figure of John the Baptist on the lid. The paraments for the refectory and the ambo in the colors purple, green, red and white, corresponding to the individual sections of the church year, were created in the 1980s for the parish hall by the painter Jürgen Seidel (1924–2014) and the textile designer Gertraude Seidel (1924–2011).

In one of the niches on the north side of the church there is a wooden figure of the crucified Jesus. In another niche is the funerary figure of the Mourning Genius with an extinguishing torch by Christian Gottlieb Kühn. It was originally placed in the St. Pauli cemetery, later moved to the Loschwitz church cemetery and finally placed in the church due to weather conditions.

== Organ ==
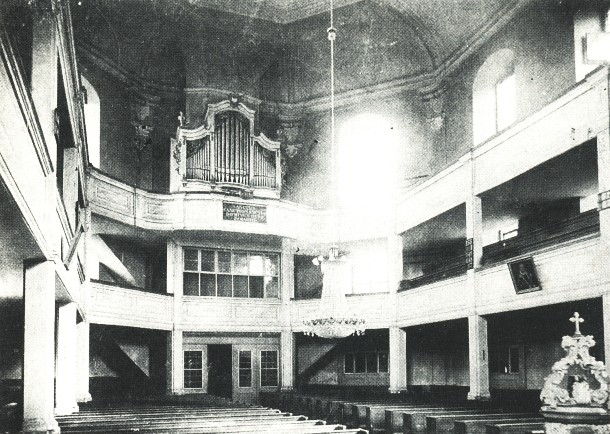
The only surviving photo of the Leibner organ from around 1885; photo by August Kotzsch

In the early years the Loschwitz congregation could not afford an organ, "only a positive was used to accompany the singing," which had been brought over from the Dreikönigskirche. When the church "Zu unserer Lieben Frauen" was demolished and the construction of the new baroque Frauenkirche began in 1726, the organ built by Tobias Weller in 1619 in the old Frauenkirche became vacant. The old Frauenkirche organ and a second, dilapidated organ from the church in the village of Plauen were used to build two inexpensive organs by 1753, one of which was purchased by the parish of Loschwitz. The Loschwitz organ, which was consecrated on October 21, 1753, was built by Johann Christoph Leibner and contained eleven voices from the old Frauenkirche organ. The organ needed repairs from the very beginning.

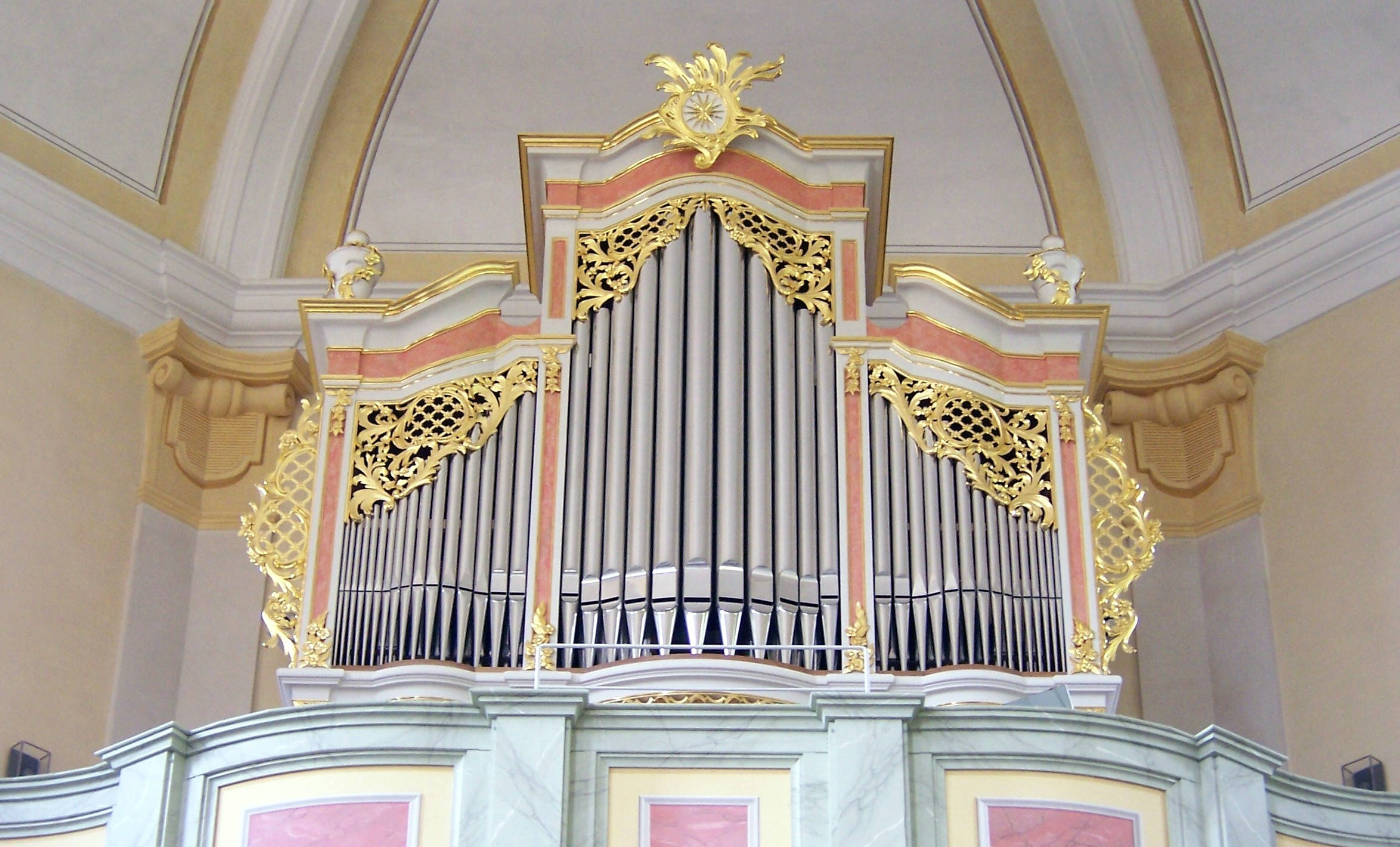
Wegscheider organ, whose exterior design is based on Leibner organ

In addition to the old parts, the instrument needed numerous repairs due to woodworm infestation. When the church was renovated in 1898/99, it was decided to purchase a new organ, which was built by the Jehmlich brothers. "On the afternoon of March 9, the same [organ] was presented to the enthusiastic congregation for the first time, with its magnificent, stylish case, its voices full of power and sweetness, and all the latest mechanics in organ building". Since the new organ was larger than the original instrument, the organ loft was extended one meter into the church.

During World War I, the tin facade pipes were melted down as part of the metal donation from the Reich. The organ was replaced with zinc facade pipes. The organ was enlarged in 1927 when a third manual was added for the antiphonal, whose pipes were installed in the attic. A celesta stop was added the following year; "the Loschwitz organ is said to have been the only one of its kind in Saxony at that time".

The organ of the Loschwitz church was destroyed in 1945. After the consecration of the rebuilt church in 1994, a positive organ (op. 654) by the Jehmlich brothers was installed, which the congregation had purchased in 1951. On October 5, 1997, a new Wegscheider organ with one manual (2nd manual with exchangeable loops), pedal and 20 stops was inaugurated in the Loschwitz church.

Disposition of the Wegscheider organ:

I Lower keyboard C-e3
1	Principal	8′ (Note: Tin)
2	Drone tune	16′ (Note: C-H wood, from c lead.)
3	Pedal	8′
4	Viola di Gamba	8′
5	Flauto traverso	8′ (Note: Lead)
6	Octave	4′
7	Reed flute	4′ (Note: Wood.)
8	Flauto amabile	4′
9	Nasat	3′
10	Octave	2′
11	Flute	2′
12	Flageolet	1′
13	Tertia	1 3/5′ (Note: Tin)
14	Mixture III	1 1/3^{'}
15	Cornet III (from g)

II Upper keyboard
Drone tune	16′
Pedal	8′
Viola di Gamba	8′
Flauto traverso	8′
Reed flute	4′
Flauto amabile	4′
Nasat	3′
Flute	2′
Tertia	1 3/5'

Pedal C–e^{1}
16	Subbass	16′
17	Octave bass	8′
18	Violonbass	8′
19	Trombone	16′ (Note: Lead plugs, wooden cup.)
20	Octave bass	4′

=== Notes ===
A cymbal Star was later added to the Wegscheider organ.

== Bells ==
The Loschwitz church originally had three bells, the largest of which weighed seven hundredweight and the second five hundredweight. They were consecrated two days before the church was consecrated on August 1, 1708. The bells of the Loschwitz church were connected to a turret clock as early as 1710, but for reasons of cost, a clock face was added to the west side of the church tower only in 1862, and in 1878 a second clock face was added in the direction of Wachwitz.

After cracks appeared in the large and middle church bells, the Royal Saxon bell founder Johann Gotthelf Große from Dresden cast three new bells for the Loschwitz church, which were solemnly consecrated in 1861:

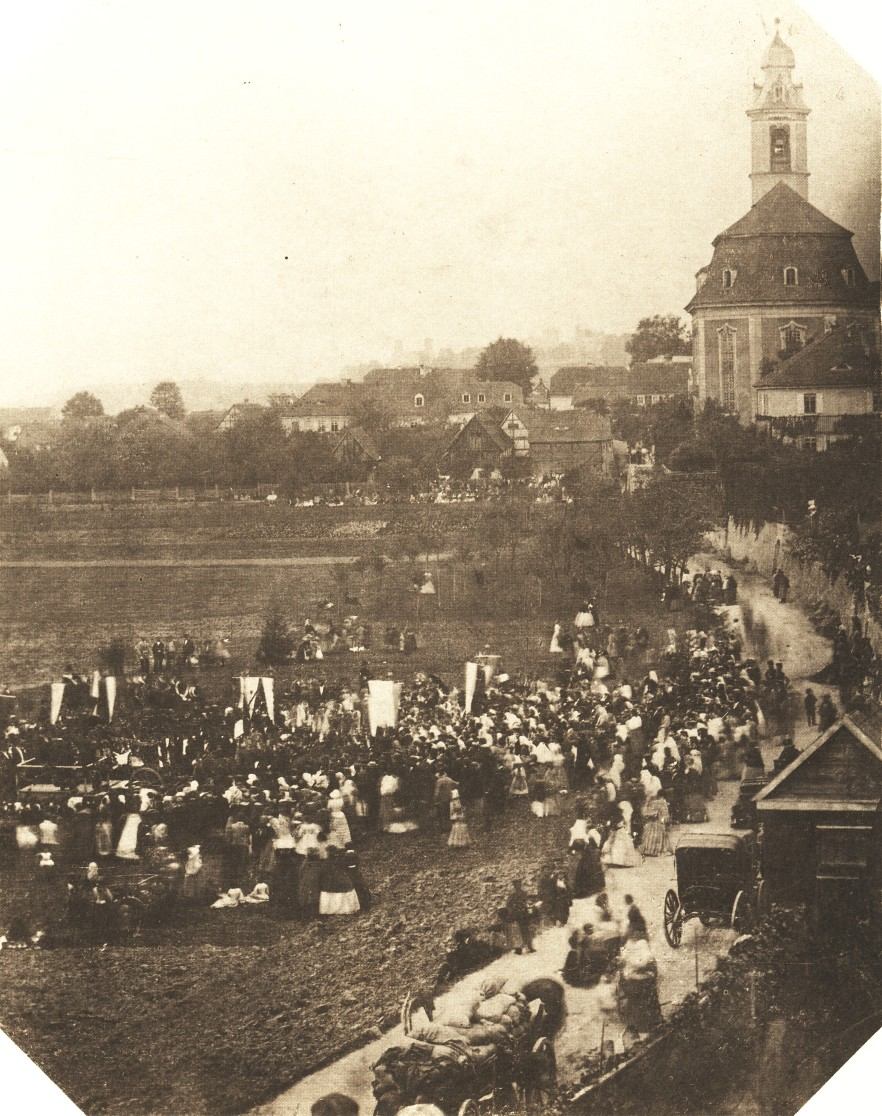
August Kotzsch - Bell consecration 1861

Name	Keynote	Year	Weight in hundredweight	Inscription	Decoration	Special function
Large bell	As	1861	10	"Gather me my saints, who honor the covenant more than sacrifice." (Psalm 50:5); "Praise the Lord in his holiness"	Eye of God surrounded by angels hovering in clouds; chalice with overhanging host	Hourly strike
Medium bell	C	1861	5	"Peace be with you." (John 20:19); "Come to me, all you who labor and are heavy laden, and I will give you rest." (Matth. 11:28)	Image of Christ; cross with palm overlay	Confession and wedding bell
Small bell	Es	1857	3	“But you, beloved, build yourselves up on your most holy faith; pray in the Holy Spirit; keep yourselves in the love of God; wait for the mercy of our Lord Jesus Christ unto eternal life" (Jude 20); "Behold, I see the heavens open." (Acts 7:55)	Dove surrounded by rays; anchor, its trunk entwined with ivy	Baptism bell

When the church was renovated in 1898–99, all three bells were replaced with new ones. Two of these bells were melted down for war purposes and replaced by two new bells in 1923. During World War II, the two largest bells had to be melted down again. The air raids on Dresden in 1945 finally destroyed the church "so thoroughly that even the baptismal bell, the only one not melted down again for the war, was never found. It was only later, during the clearing of the ruins, that a small piece of bronze was discovered. In 1969, the "young congregation" erected a temporary belfry in the ruins of the church, which was equipped with three new bronze bells from the Schilling foundry in Apolda. The fifth bell consecration in the history of the Loschwitz church took place on November 2, 1969.

Name	Keynote	Year	Weight in kg	Inscription	Diameter in centimeters	Special function
Large bell	e′	1969	1300	"Jesus Christ, yesterday, and today: and the same for ever."	126	Funeral bell
Medium bell	g′	1969	720	"Praise the Lord, my soul, and do not forget the good things he has done for you."	104	Wedding bell
Small bell	a′	1969	500	"I am the way and the truth and the life, no one comes to the Father except through me".	91	Wedding bell

== Graveyard ==
Before the Loschwitz Church was built, the deceased of the village of Loschwitz had been buried since 1571 in St. John's Cemetery in front of the Pirna Gate. When the church was built, two graves were laid out in the churchyard in the late medieval tradition to serve as a cemetery for the community. In the northwest corner of the cemetery, there was a stretcher house.

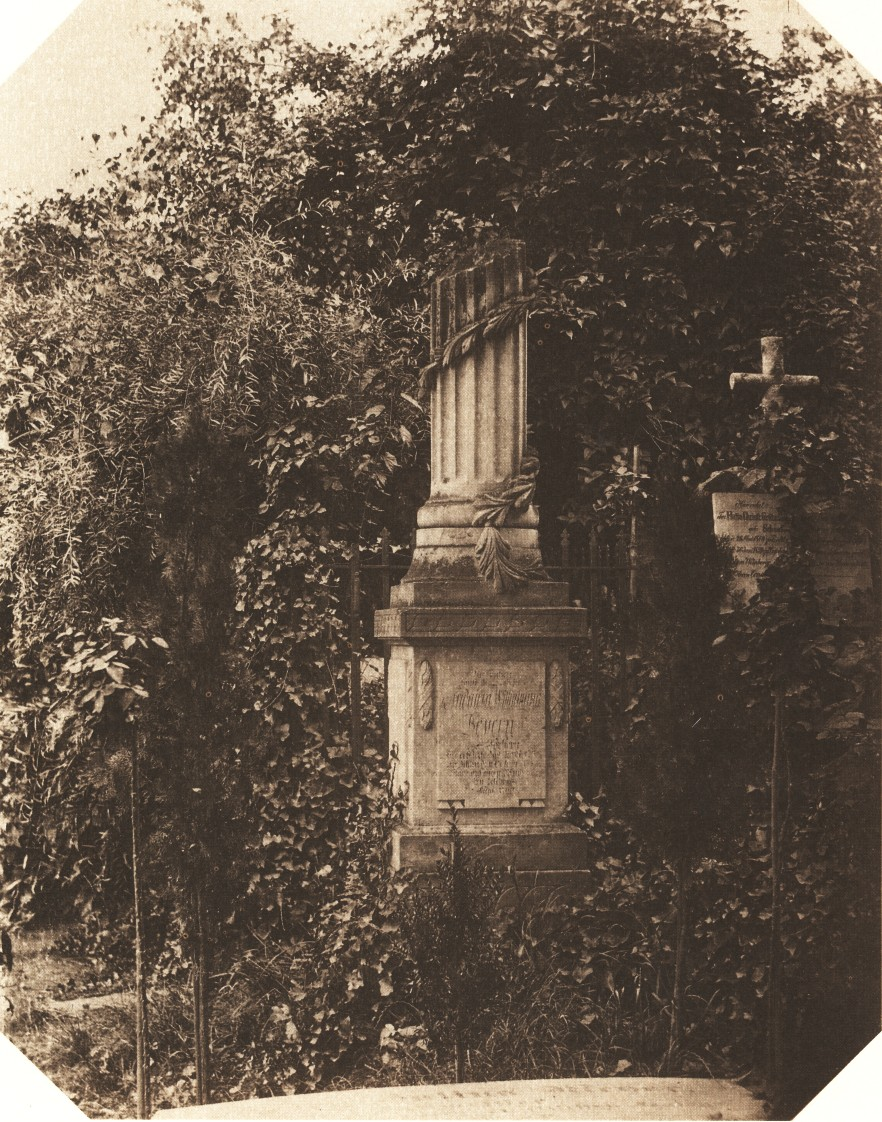
August Kotzsch - Grave column around 1870

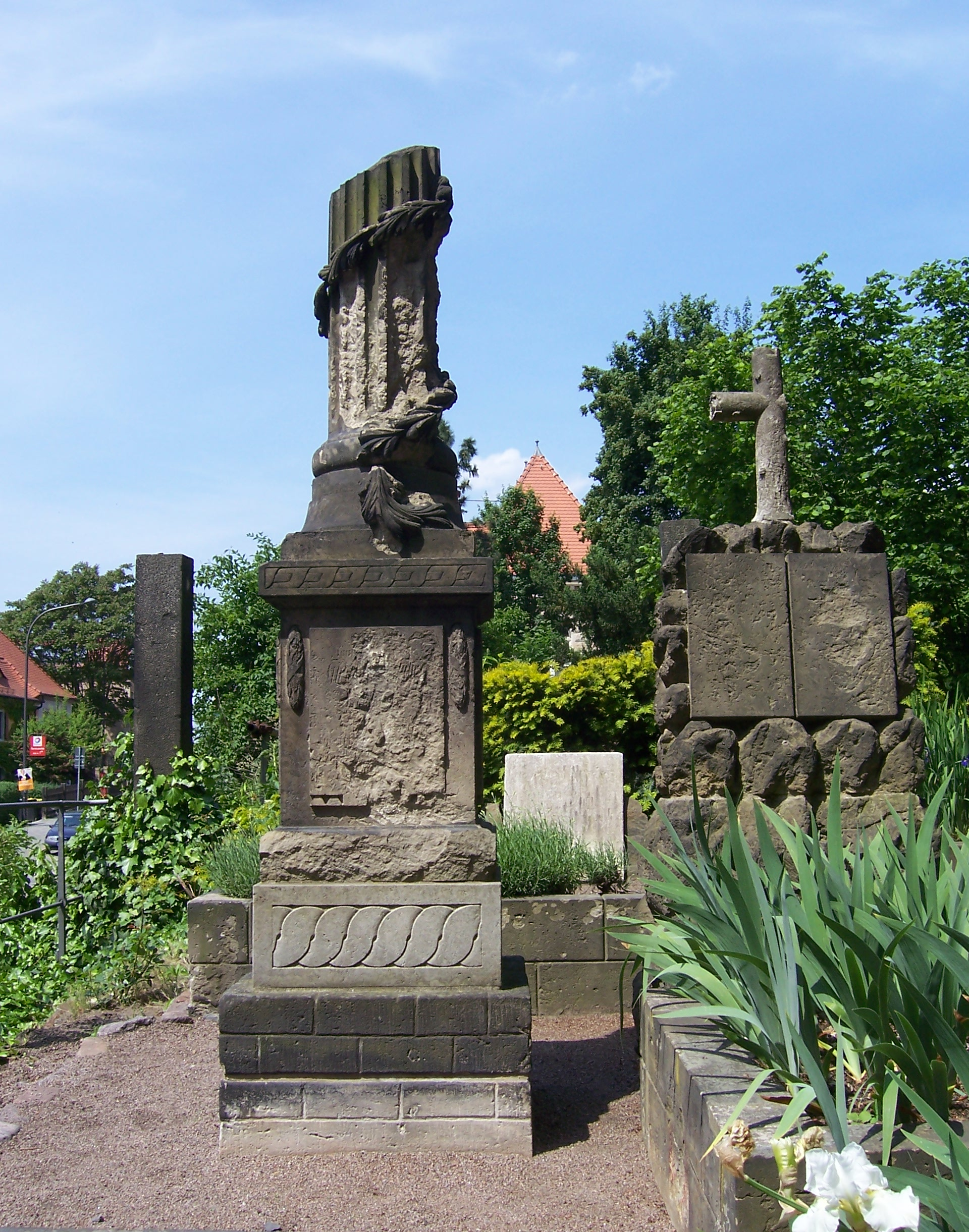
The same grave with clear signs of decay in 2009

Until about 1800, the Loschwitz Cemetery was the only cemetery in the village. The first burials took place before the cemetery was completed in 1710. The small area could not be expanded in the following years: To the east, south, and north of the church were vineyards, and to the west of the church, 2.5 meters below it, was today's Pillnitz Landstrasse, "until 1885 a barely four-meter wide, unpaved road". Even at the time of its construction, the church and the cemetery could only be accessed via a double ramp, but in this way, they were optimally protected from flooding.

In 1800 the Loschwitz Cemetery was established to relieve the churchyard, so that until 1907 only a few burials, mostly hereditary burials, took place in the churchyard. While the Loschwitz church was destroyed in 1945, the cemetery was only slightly damaged. However, the gravestones, mostly made of sandstone, fell into disrepair or were destroyed by vandalism in the following decades. During the reconstruction of the Loschwitz church, the gravestones were removed completely. Reconstruction and restoration of the cemetery began in 1998 and was completed in 2003. Today, the Loschwitz church cemetery is "one of the few original, newly laid out church cemeteries in the Dresden area [...] The development of grave monuments and grave design from the late Baroque to Historicism can be seen here in a very small space". The cemetery has been under monument protection since 1978.

In the northwest corner of the property is a lapidarium that contains a restored reproduction of the gravestone of composer Johann Gottlieb Naumann, who received his first musical training as a child in the Loschwitz church, as well as decaying grave sculptures and a memorial plaque to soldiers who died in the Franco-Prussian War of 1870–71. Naumann's grave is in the Elias Cemetery in Dresden.

The graves of the writer Eduard Maria Oettinger and the first Loschwitz chronicler and cantor of the Loschwitz church, Friedrich Wilhelm Pohle, are located in the western section of the cemetery. Important Loschwitz personalities buried in the western cemetery include Friedrich Wilhelm Seebe (1791–1867), owner of the Eckberg vineyard, Carl Gottfried Fischer (1783–1802), owner of the "Weißer Hirsch" inn, and numerous members of the Modes ferry master family, who owned the Loschwitz ferry for more than 100 years.

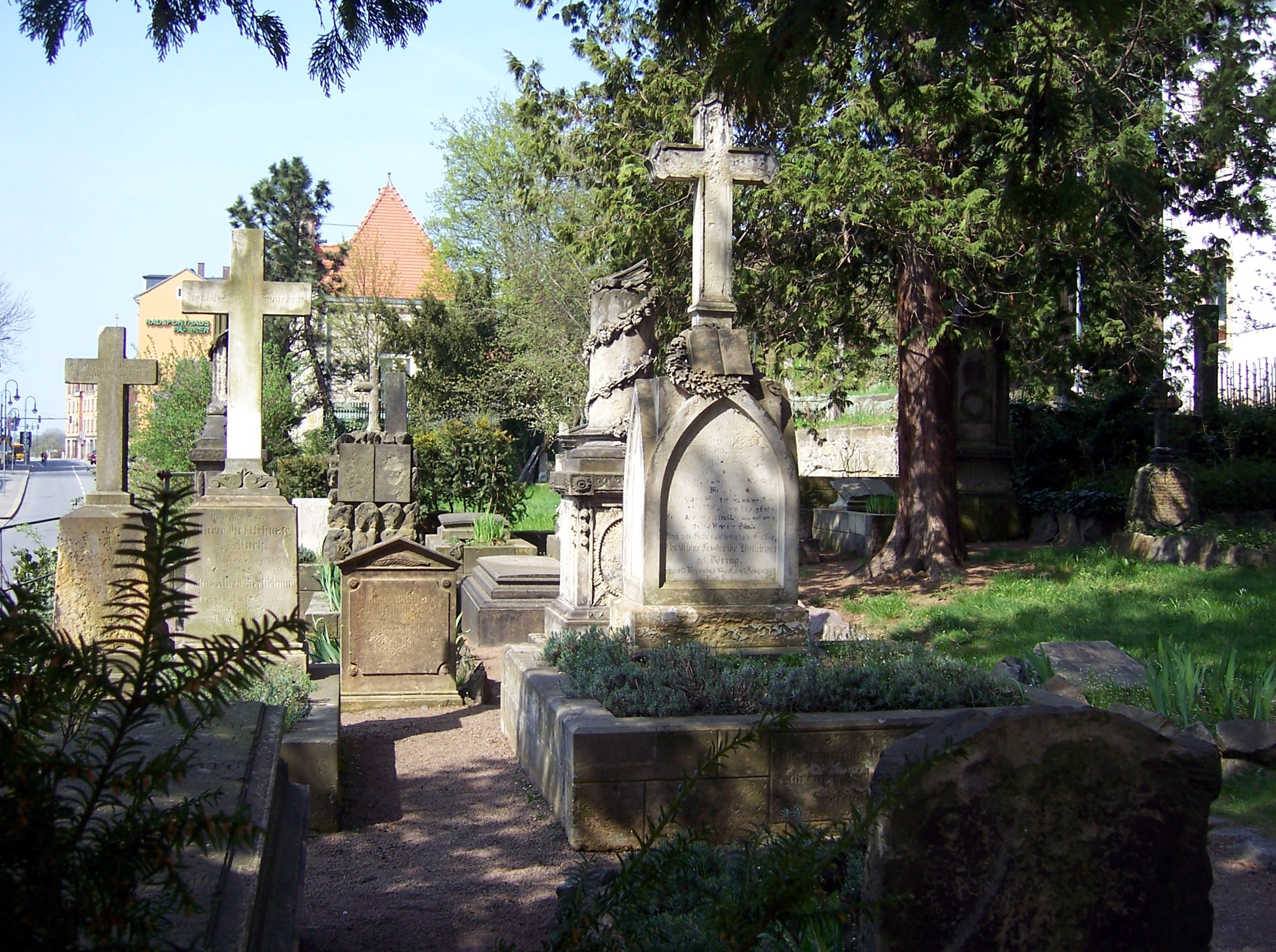
Western cemetery

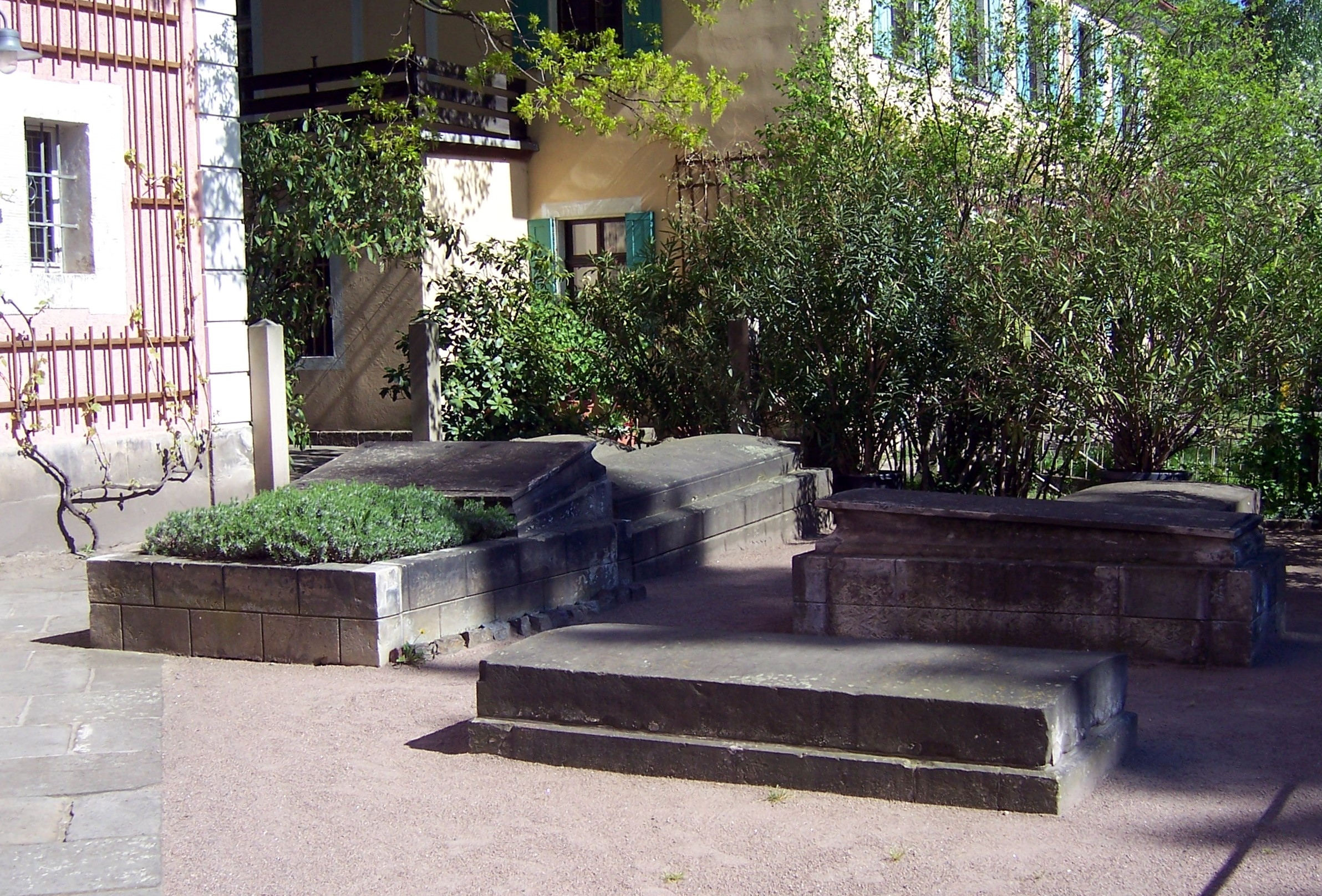
Southeastern cemetery

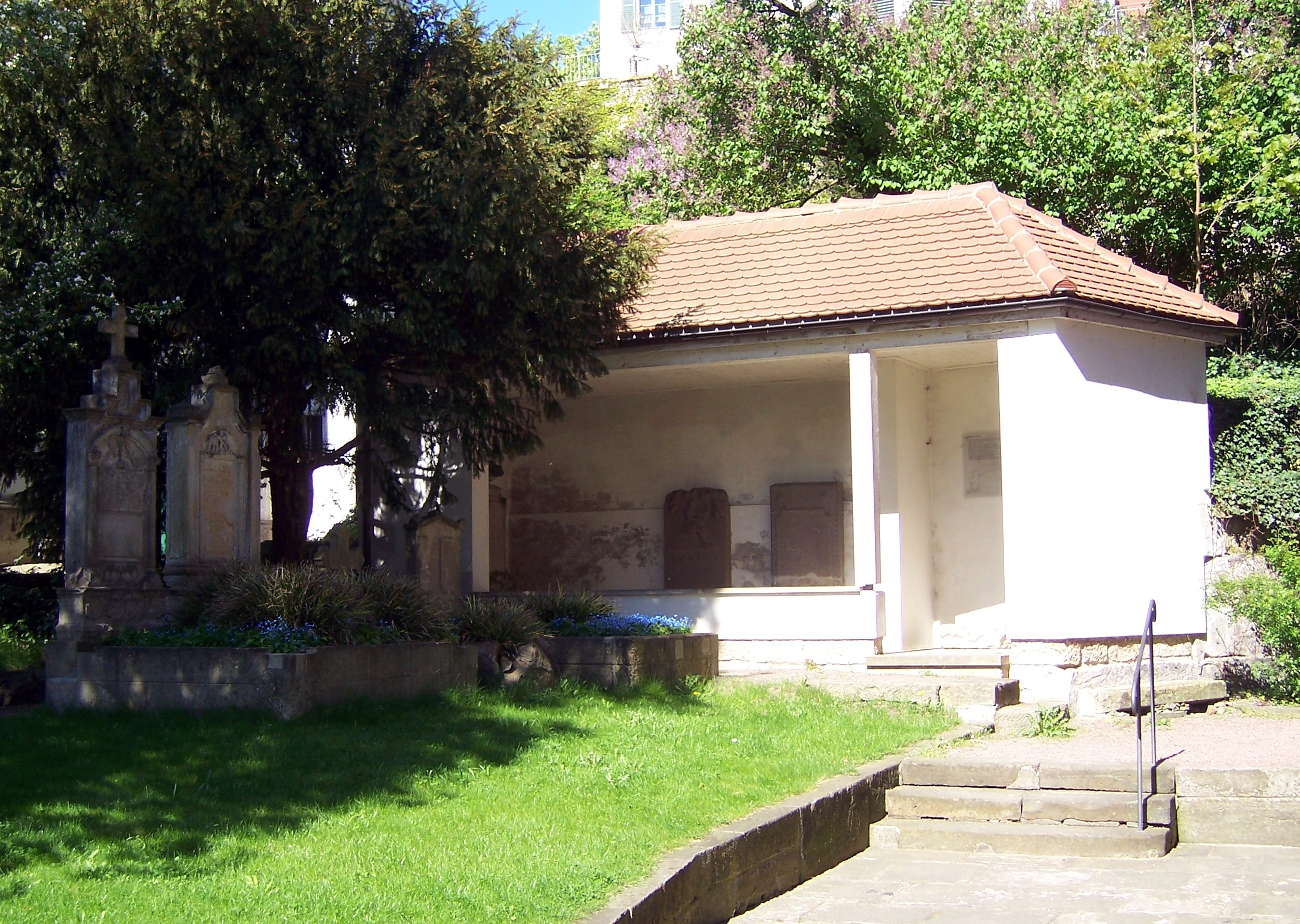
Lapidarium

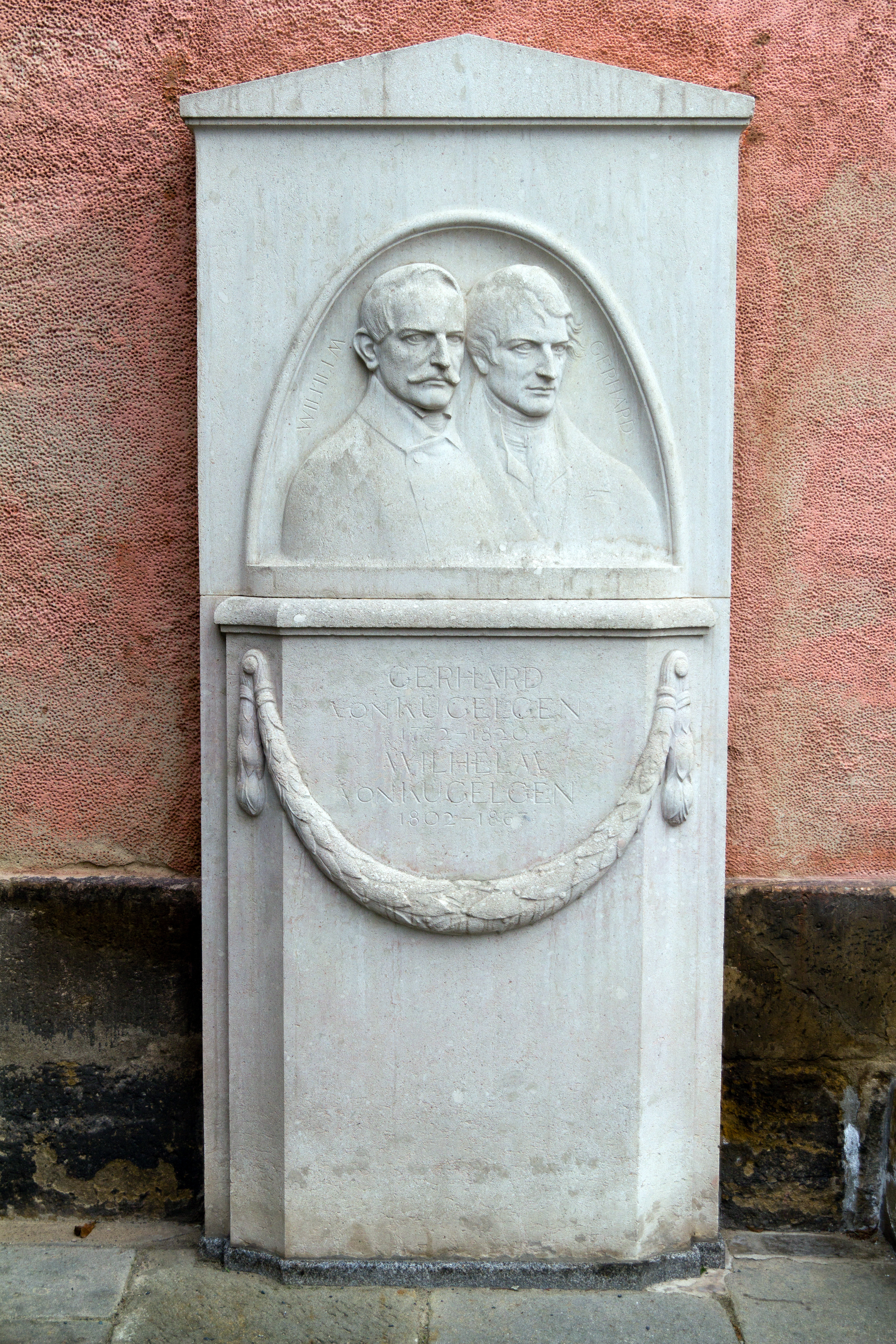
Memorial stone for Gerhard and Wilhelm von Kügelgen

Five gravestones are still preserved on the smaller cemetery to the southeast, including the burial place of Lord Jacob Graf von Findlater and his lover Johann Georg Christian Fischer. The grave of a daughter of the Dresden goldsmith Johann Melchior Dinglinger, who owned a vineyard property with a summer house in Loschwitz, has not survived.

Since 1920, a memorial stone by the sculptor Heinrich Wedemeyer (1867–1941) has stood in front of the south portal of the church, commemorating the painter Gerhard von Kügelgen, who was murdered in Loschwitz, and his son Wilhelm von Kügelgen, who created a literary monument to Loschwitz in his autobiography, Jugenderinnerungen eines alten Mannes.

=== The Loschwitz Church as a burial site ===
The Loschwitz church served as a burial ground in the 18th century. The graves were located in specially constructed burial vaults in the area of the altar, the side aisles and the nave. The exact number of graves cannot be reconstructed. The Loschwitz chronicler and cantor Friedrich Wilhelm Pohle made the first list of five burial vaults with bronze epitaphs in 1883. Behind three crosses and stars on a floor slab in the central nave, Pohle suspected "burial places of parish children in Loschwitz. It was only when the graves were examined during the reconstruction of the Loschwitz church in the early 1990s that the grave of an unknown person was discovered. The graves were disturbed and partially removed during the renovation of the church in 1898/99. At the end of the renovation, the simple bronze inscription plaques were placed on the walls. During the inventory of art and architectural monuments in Saxony in 1904, Cornelius Gurlitt described in detail the five bronze plaques of the known tombs that fell victim to the Reich Metal Donation during the Second World War. The epitaph of only one tomb in the central nave, which neither Pohle nor Gurlitt described, survived and is now in the parish archives.

== Usage ==
The Loschwitz Church was built in 1704 as a village church for the newly founded parish of Loschwitz. After the church was destroyed in 1945, services were held in the parish hall at Grundstrasse 36. Since its consecration on October 2, 1994, the Loschwitz Church is once again the center of the community. In addition to Sunday services, weddings are also held in the building. Since the inauguration of the Wegscheider organ on October 5, 1997, the church has become a popular concert venue in Dresden. The Wegscheider organ "impresses with its fantastic spatial sound" and has already been used for CD recordings. Concerts in the Loschwitz church have also been released on CD.

== Bibliography ==
- Annette Dubbers (Ed.): Loschwitz. Self-published, Dresden 2003, p. 15–18.
- Ev.-Luth-Congregation Dresden-Loschwitz (Ed.): 300 Jahre Kirchgemeinde Dresden-Loschwitz. Festschrift. Ev.-Luth. Congregation Dresden-Loschwitz, Dresden 2004.
- Cornelius Gurlitt: Beschreibende Darstellung der älteren Bau- und Kunstdenkmäler des Königreichs Sachsen. Volume 26. Meinhold, Dresden 1904, p. 84–89.
- Marianne Kunze (Editor): Festschrift zur Orgelweihe, 5. Oktober 1997 in der Kirche zu Dresden-Loschwitz. Ev.-Luth. Congregation Dresden-Loschwitz, Dresden 1997.
- Heinrich Magirius: Der Nosseni-Altar aus der Sophienkirche in Dresden. Publishing house of the Saxon Academy of Sciences, Leipzig 2004.
- Wilhelm Möllering: George Bähr, ein protestantischer Kirchenbaumeister des Barock. Frommhold & Wendler, Leipzig 1933, p. 32–36.
- Eberhard Münzner: Die Kirche zu Dresden Loschwitz. Schnell & Steiner, Regensburg 1994.
- Eberhard Münzner: Report on the conservation investigations accompanying the reconstruction. Monument Protection Office, City of Dresden 1995.
- M. J. Nestler: Gesammtüberblick über die Loschwitzer Kirchenerneuerung. In: Sachsens Elbgau-Presse, 2nd ed. 14th year, number 87, April 16, 1899, p. 9-11.
- Friedrich Wilhelm Pohle: Chronik von Loschwitz. Published by Christian Teich, Dresden 1883, p. 123–173.
- Marion Stein: Friedhöfe in Dresden. Art publisher, Dresden 2000, p. 166–168.

51.053047°N 13.817343°E
