= Saxon Police History Collection =

Museum in Dresden, Germany

Coordinates: 51°03′2.50″N 13°44′38.50″E

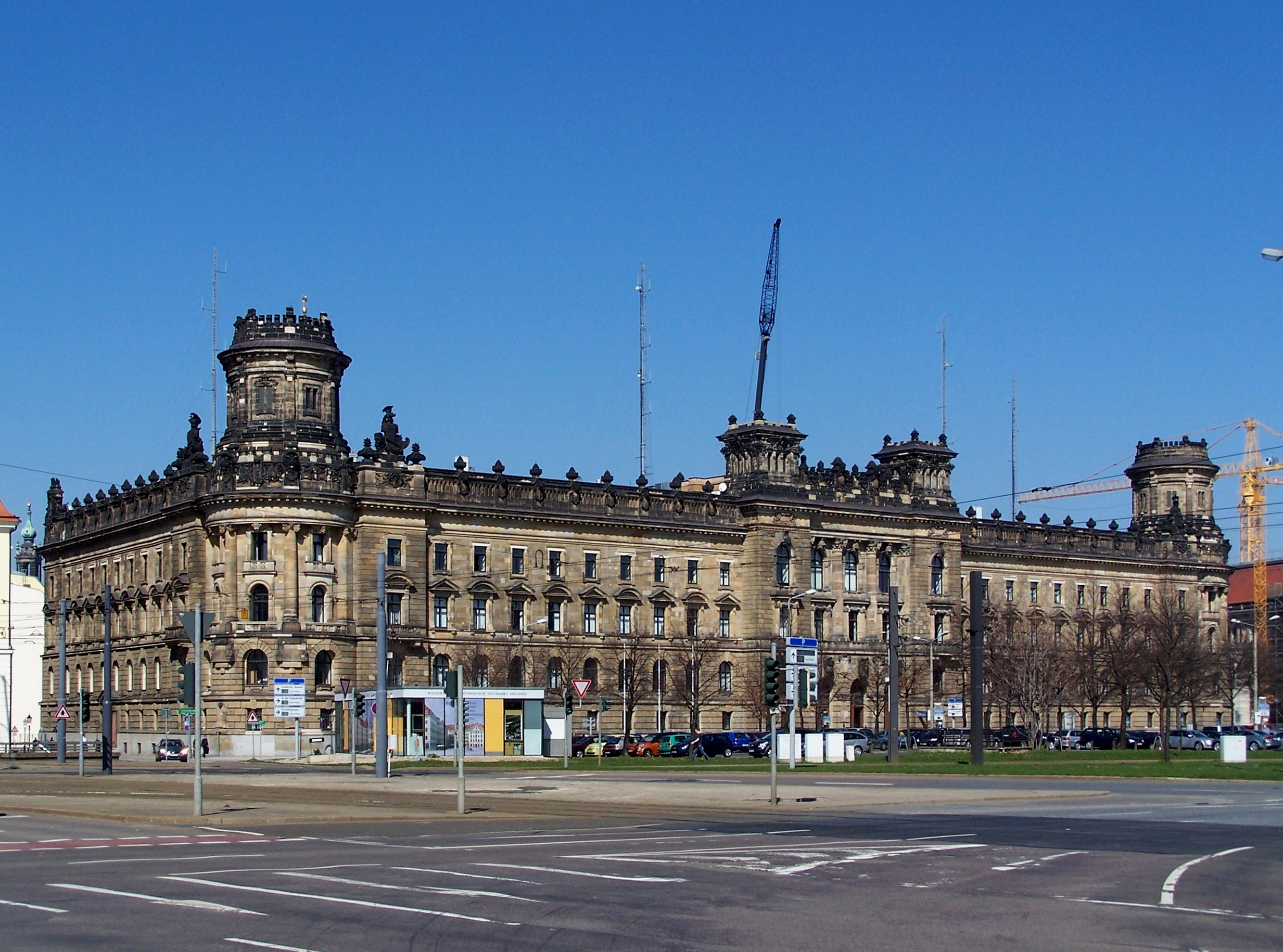
Dresden's Polizeipräsidium from Pirnaischen Platz.

The Saxon Police History Collection (German - Polizeihistorische Sammlung Sachsen) is a collection of objects on police history in Dresden, the capital of Saxony. It includes the surviving remnants of the Dresden Crime Museum (Dresdner Kriminalmuseums) which was seen as one of the world's main criminal-history collections in the period before 1945. It is housed in several rooms on the top floor of the Polizeipräsidium on Schießgasse at the heart of the old city.
