= Kaiserpalast =

Coordinates: 51°02′58″N 13°44′44″E

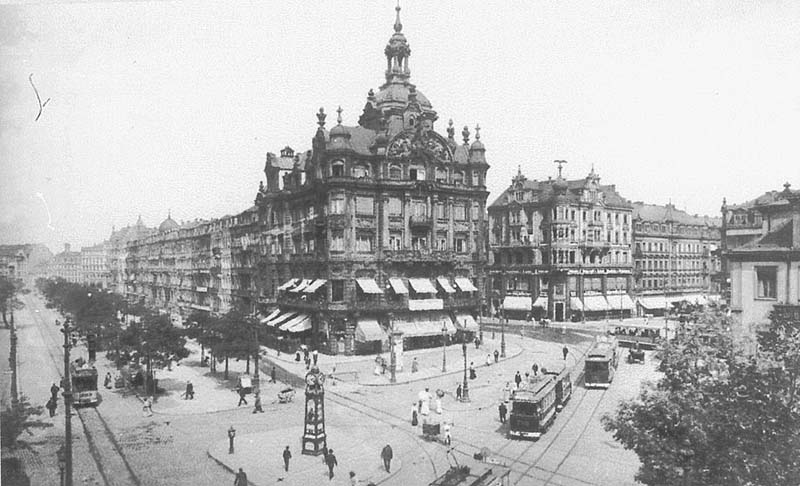
Pirnaischer Platz with the Kaiserpalast (Ilgenhaus), c 1910

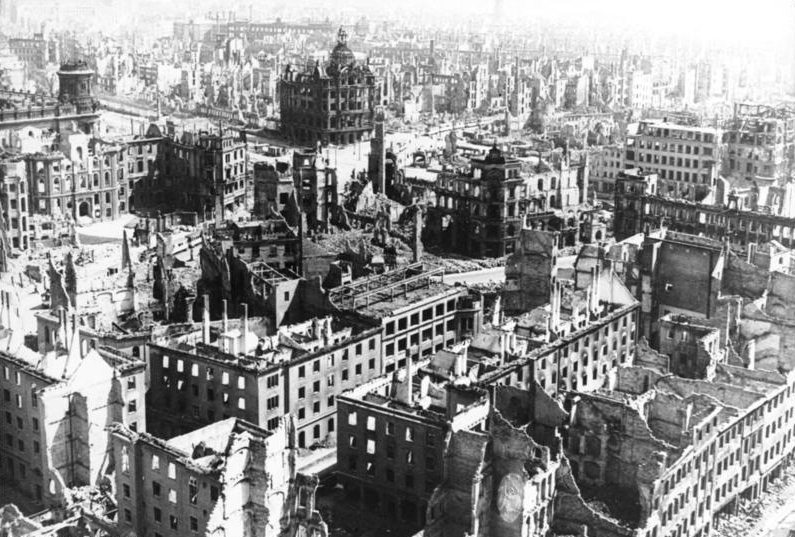
The Pirnaischer Platz in February 1945, with the Kaiserpalast ruins at the top of the picture.

The Kaiserpalast was a five-storey neo-Baroque building in Dresden, which stood on the north side of the Pirnaischer Platz between Moritzring and Amalienstraße. It was built between 1895 and 1897 as the Geschäftshaus Ilgen by the architects Schilling und Graebner for the businessman Hermann Ilgen.

It had one tower and on its gable were statues by Hans Hartmann-MacLean. Its porch had a huge window designed by Josef Goller. The ground and first floors were faced with sandstone and the other floors' facades were plastered. It housed a restaurant and a bank. It was destroyed in February 1945 during the bombing of Dresden and the remaining ruins were demolished in 1951.

== History and description ==
The Kaiserpalast was supposed to replace the restaurant and café Pirnaischer Platz of the operator Otto Scharfe after the development of the surrounding area made this establishment unattractive. The new building was financed by the pharmacist Hermann Ilgen. He bought the property on which the future building was to stand and in 1894 put out an architectural competition for which he created clear usage guidelines that adhered to the Dresden building regulations of the time, which required a representative design for the square, as well as a representative design, who had to be trained at least on the front sides of the Moritz and Amalienring.

Scharfe was to run a restaurant again in the four-story new building. The upper floors should either be used as a hotel or rented out as offices and studios. In the tender, Ilgen asked for a two-story basement on the side facing Amalienstraße so that the drinks store of the future restaurant could be kept cool, and also a passage between Amalienstraße and Ringstraße on the ground floor, a third of which would be reserved for the restaurant and the rest of it to Pirnaischer Platz, should be occupied with shops. The entire area of the first floor should be available for the restaurant and have a balcony, the second floor was intended for offices,

113 drafts had been submitted by the deadline of March 15, 1895. 103 were discarded, and Ilgen, one Mr. Rossbach and Professors Wallot and Gottschaldt dealt more intensively with ten drafts. They awarded the third prize of 500 marks to the architect Metzendorf from Elberfeld, and a second third prize to the Dresden architects Hermann Richter and Otto Förster. Two other designs that were not implemented were also shortlisted. One came from the Dresden architect Johannes Fischer, the other had the Saxon name "Bärnsche Dor". The first prize went to Th. Martin from Freiberg, who found a clever solution for the light shaft, but had equipped the planned office floors with bathtubs. It was finally decided.

The architects Schilling and Graebner, who based themselves on the selected design by Lossow & Viehweger, received the contract for the new building and had it built under their direction from 1895. The ground floor and the first floor were clad in sandstone . In contrast to the award-winning design, the balcony on the first floor was laid out all around. The upper floors were plastered and decorated with rich figurines, which were soon criticized as exaggerated. In an openwork gable in front of the dome of the building was an allegorical representation of the variety theater by Hans Hartmann-MacLean . [1] Three wall paintings and one ceiling painting in the main hall of the Imperial Palace came from Otto Fischer .

The windows, especially a colossal window in the vestibule, were designed by Josef Goller .

Otto Scharfes Restaurant was opened in December 1897. It was located in this building until around 1920, after which its premises were used by Commerzbank . In 1940 the Frenzel, Schindler and Krumm shops were also rented in the building, as well as Deutsche Gasolin AG and the lawyers Barmann and Hennig, the Horst Meier photo studio and the singing teacher Doris Winkler. An apartment under the roof was used by the stoker of the Kaiserpalast.

During the air raids on Dresden in February 1945, the Kaiserpalast was badly hit and burned down. In the course of clearing large areas in 1951, the ruins were torn down. The space that was freed up was used for road traffic towards the main train station and for a green area. The cellars of the building are below these areas, although filled, but still there.

== Gallery ==
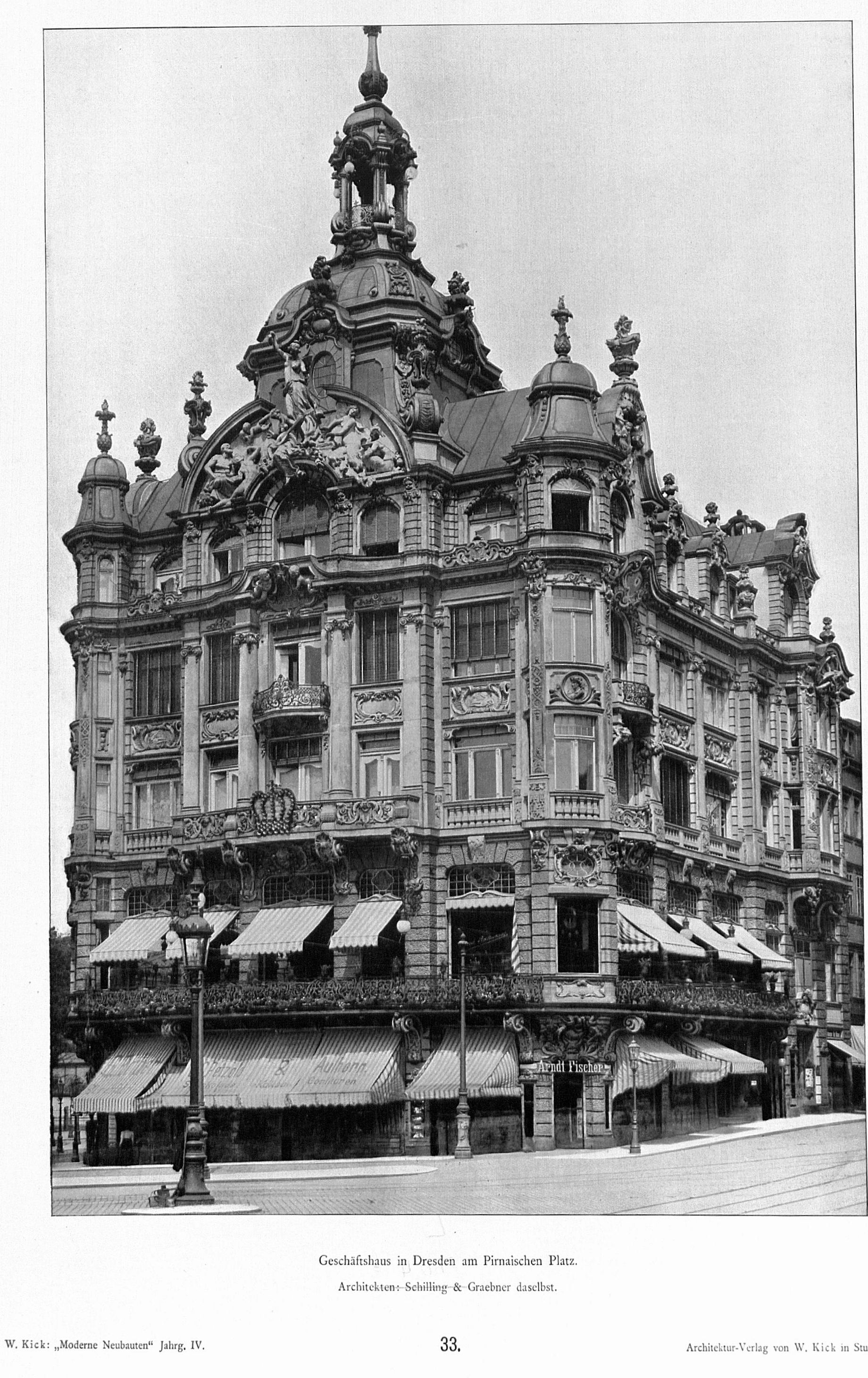
General view from Pirnaischer Platz

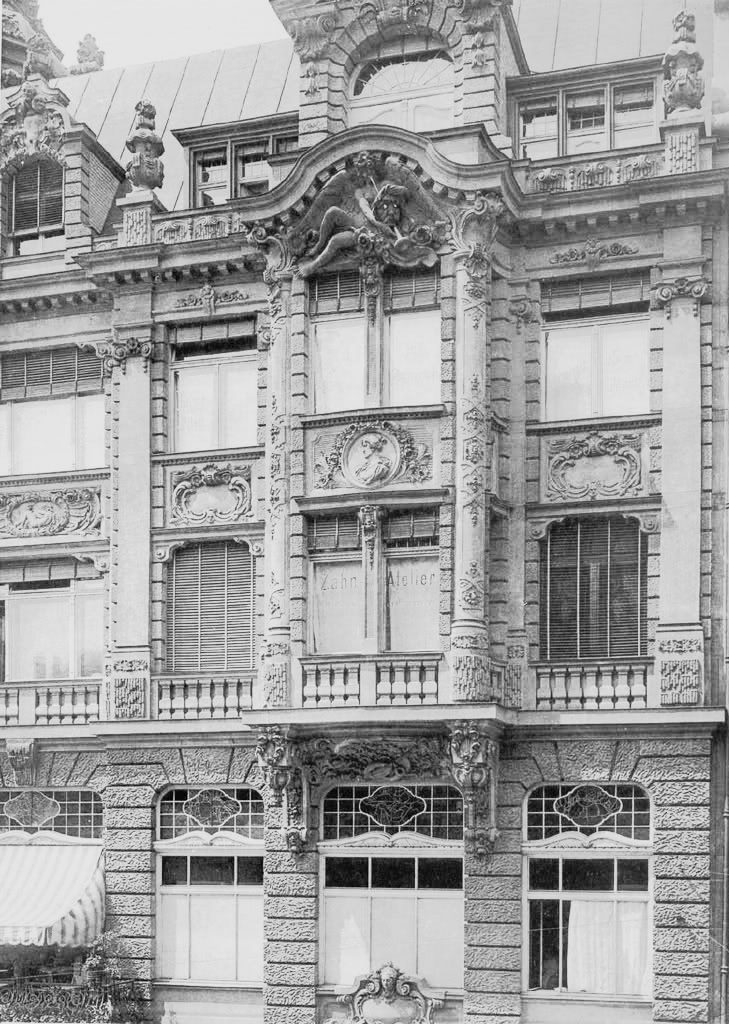
East side of the Kaiserpalast

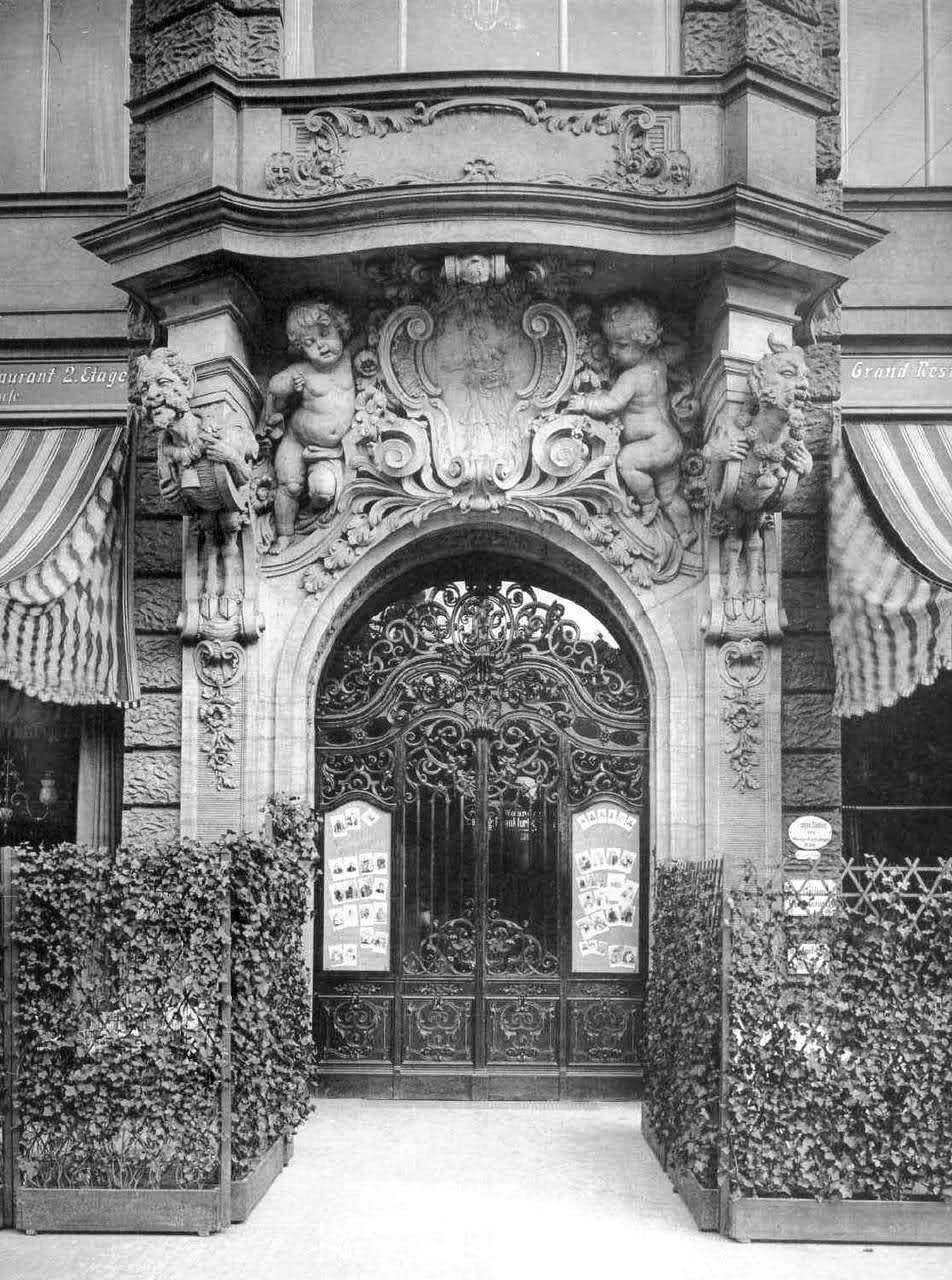
Entrance

== Bibliography ==
- (in German) Stadtlexikon Dresden A–Z. Verlag der Kunst, Dresden 1995, ISBN 3-364-00300-9.
