= Karl Emil Scherz =

German architect and local historian

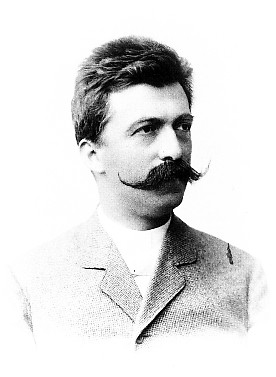
Karl Emil Scherz in a photograph by James Aurig

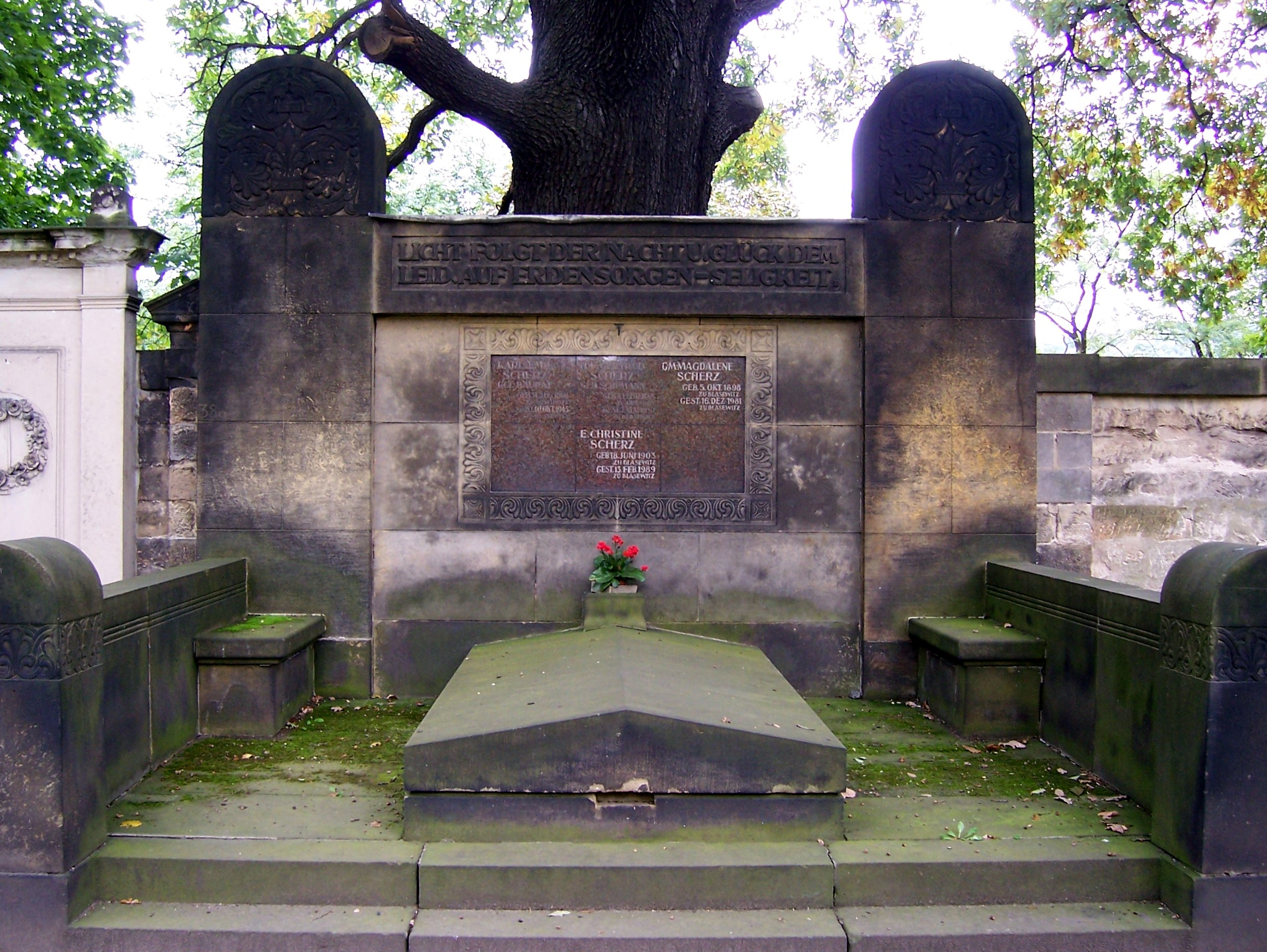
Grave of Karl Emil Scherz in the Johannisfriedhof in Dresden

Karl Emil Scherz (31 August 1860, in Loschwitz near Dresden – 10 October 1945, in Dresden) was a German architect and local historian of Blasewitz.
