= James Aurig =

German photographer (1857–1935)

James Buchanan Aurig
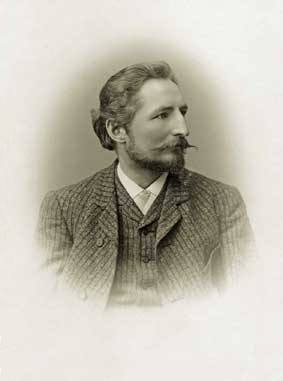
- Born: 28 August 1857; Guben
- Died: 19 December 1935 (aged 78); Blasewitz
- Occupation: Photographer

James Buchanan Aurig (28 August 1857 – 19 December 1935) was a German photographer. He photographed the royal family of King Frederick Augustus III of Saxony. The photography series was published by C. A. Maschke onto postcards.

== Life ==
Aurig was born on 28 August 1857 in Guben. He became an orphan at an early age. He went to live with a foster family in the Ore Mountains.

At the age of 15, he became a photographer's assistant in Chemnitz. Around 1878, he was employed by photographer Johannes Schumacher who had a photographic studio on Tolkewitzer Strasse in Dresden. That same year, Aurig married Berta Alma Müller. The couple had five children.

Eventually, Schuhmacher had to close his business. Afterwards, Aurig earned money by retouching pictures. He worked for various photographers in Dresden including C. A. Maschke, Lichtdruckanstalt Römmler & Jonas and Emil Rommler. C.A. Maschke published his photos on "radium brom" paper.

He mainly took photographs in Dresden, Berlin, Holland, Belgium and Switzerland.

He opened a woodworking studio and a photography supplies store in Blasewitz from 1894 to 1895. He had Karl Emil Scherz build him a villa with a daylight studio at Hainstrasse 14 (present-day Justinenstrasse 2). Here, he did portrait photography and wedding photography. Outside his studio, Aurig mainly captured current events in his photographs.

After the turn of the century, he increasingly turned to home portraiture, meaning that he went with his photography equipment to mostly well-known personalities in the city to take their portraits. Among his many clients in 1908, Aurig was tasked with taking portraits of the Saxon royal family. In 1911, King Friedrich August III awarded Aurig with the title of "Court Photographer to His Majesty."

Aurig died in Blasewitz on 19 December 1935 and was buried in the family grave at the Tolkewitz Urn Grove.

== Work ==
After settling in Blasewitz, Aurig photographed mainly in Dresden, especially in the villa suburbs of Blasewitz and Loschwitz. He captured current events in his photographs. He also took architectural photographs of buildings in Dresden and new villa buildings in Blasewitz, among others. Like August Kotzsch, Aurig also captured the construction of the Blue Wonder, also known as the Loschwitzer bridge. Of particular documentary value are Aurig's few surviving studies of the milieu and photographs of buildings that were about to be demolished.

Aurig was one of the most important studio photographers in the Dresden area in the early 1900s. He photographed a wide variety of subjects including creating portraits of politicians, clergymen, and professors at Dresden's universities.

"Until the outbreak of World War I, James Aurig was the top address for high-quality portraits."[1]

== Gallery ==
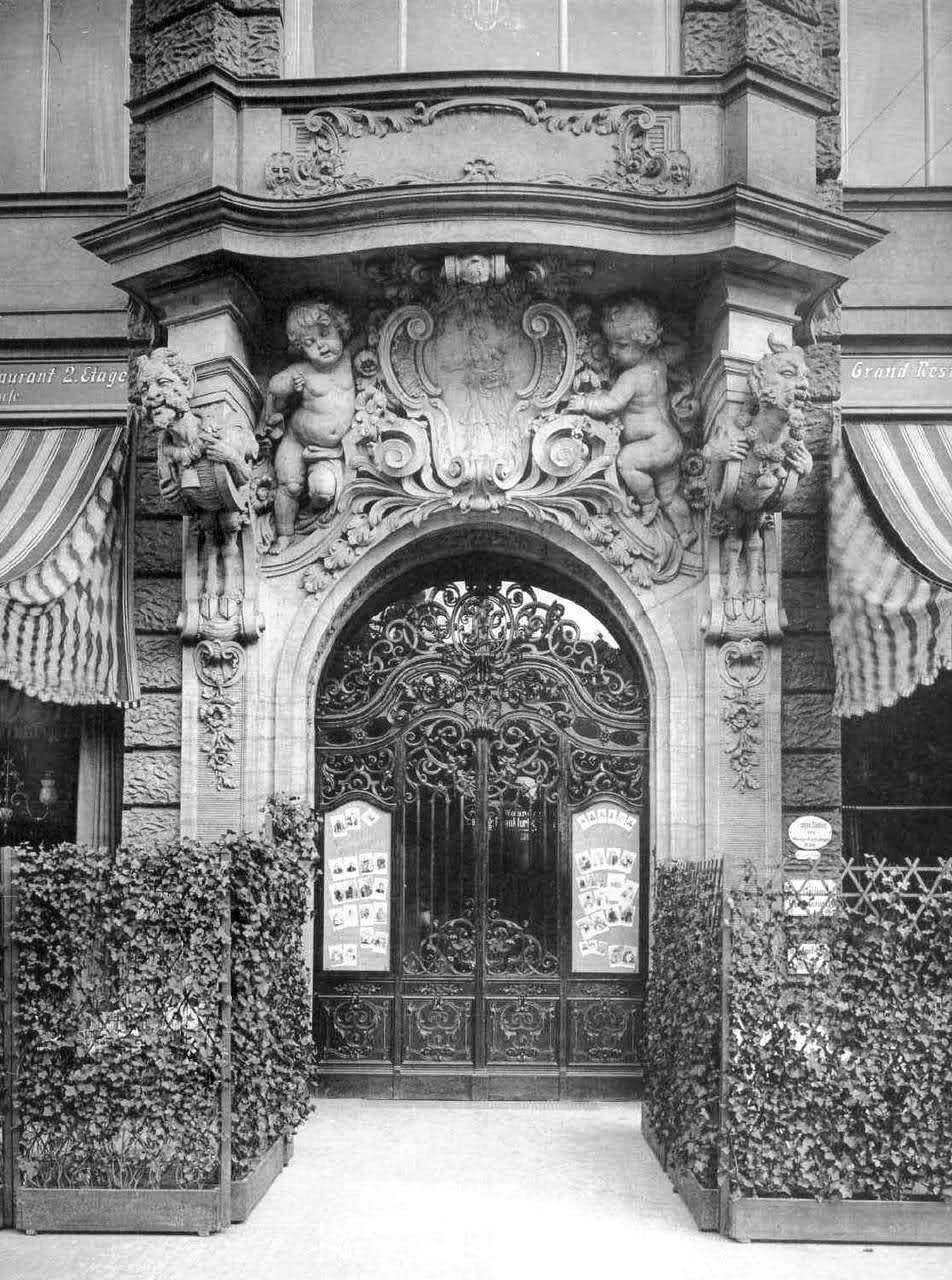
Entrance to the Kaiserpalast 1901

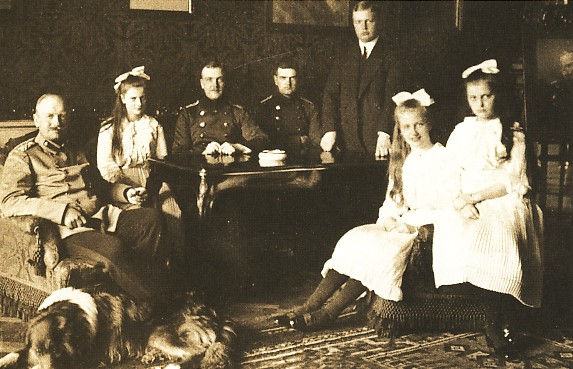
King Frederick Augustus III with his children

== Sources ==
1. Vgl. Jürgen Frohse: Photographie in Blasewitz – James Aurig.
