= Josef Goller =

German designer (1868 - 1947)

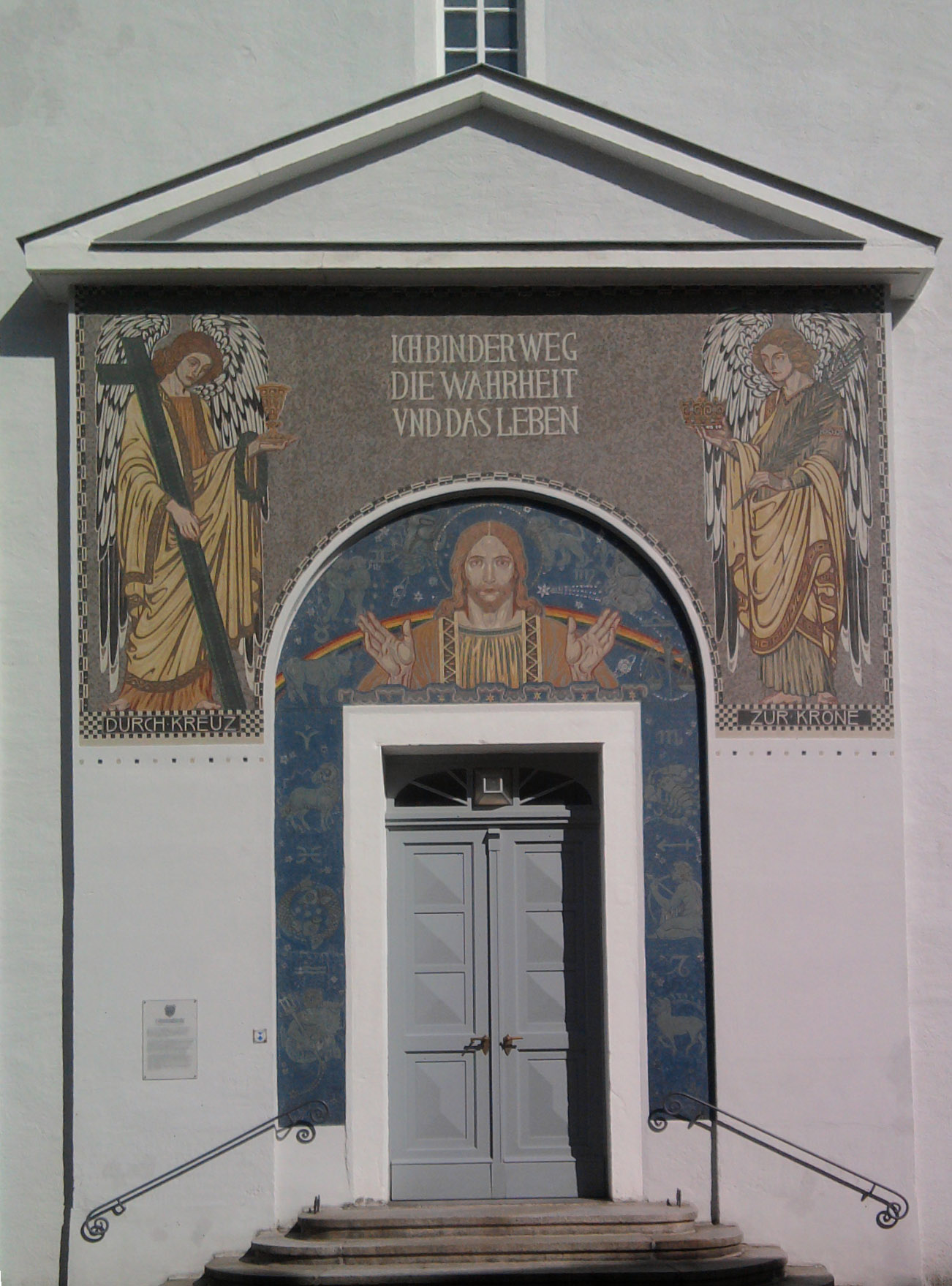
Mosaic at the entrance of Christuskirche Bischofswerda (together with Villeroy & Boch)

Josef Goller (25 January 1868 in Dachau – 29 May 1947 in Obermenzing) was a German designer, most notably of stained glass.

== Life ==
Goller apprenticed at Franz Mayer & Co. and attended the School of Applied Arts in Munich. After a first employment in Zittau, in 1890 he moved to Dresden, where he joined the well-known stained glass company of Bruno Urban; he later became Urban's partner. From 1906 Goller taught at the School of Applied Arts in Dresden, now the Dresden Academy of Fine Arts, from about 1909 as a professor. Among his students were Otto Griebel (stained glass) and Friedrich Kurt Fiedler (graphics). In 1928 Goller returned to Munich.

== Artwork ==
He created stained glass for town halls in Nuremberg, Dresden, and Chemnitz and for many churches and schools in Saxony and the synagogue of Görlitz, but also for the windows of the neo-Baroque Kaiserpalast, Dresden's most impressive private building at that time, the Dresden Zoo and the Leipzig Hauptbahnhof. Moreover, Goller designed the interior of important national and international exhibitions in Dresden, as well as the colouring of the foyer in the Semperoper.

Goller became known for his works in Art Nouveau style, but he remained open to new influences. He was a member of Die Elbier, a post-secessionist movement led by Gotthardt Kuehl which reflected impressionism and en plein air. With time Goller became a supporter of form follows function and joined the Deutscher Werkbund. He also created noted posters and designed books. He had friendly relations with Peter Behrens and Johann Vincenz Cissarz.

== Literature ==
- Frank Fiedler, Uwe Fiedler: Lebensbilder aus der Oberlausitz, Books on Demand, 2017 (Digitalisat in the Internet Archive)
