= Pirnaischer Platz =

Public square in Dresden, Germany

Coordinates: 51°02′57″N 13°44′43″E

The Pirnaischer Platz is a square in Dresden, Germany. It is the site of the city's Landhaus.

"Pirnaischer Platz" - square with city museum and the police precinct - as a panoramic view
