= Pillnitz =

- Quarter of Dresden
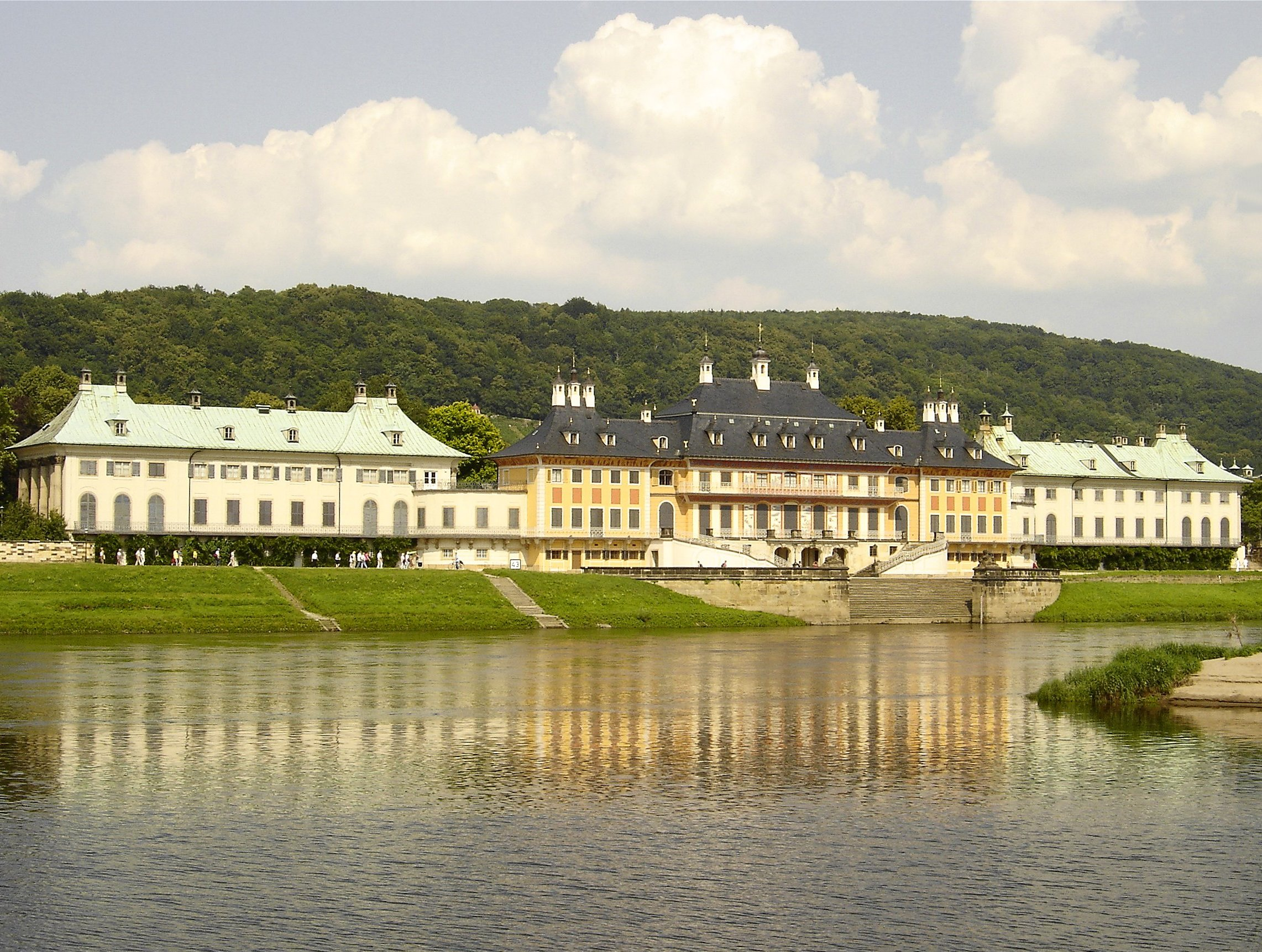
- Pillnitz Castle and river Elbe

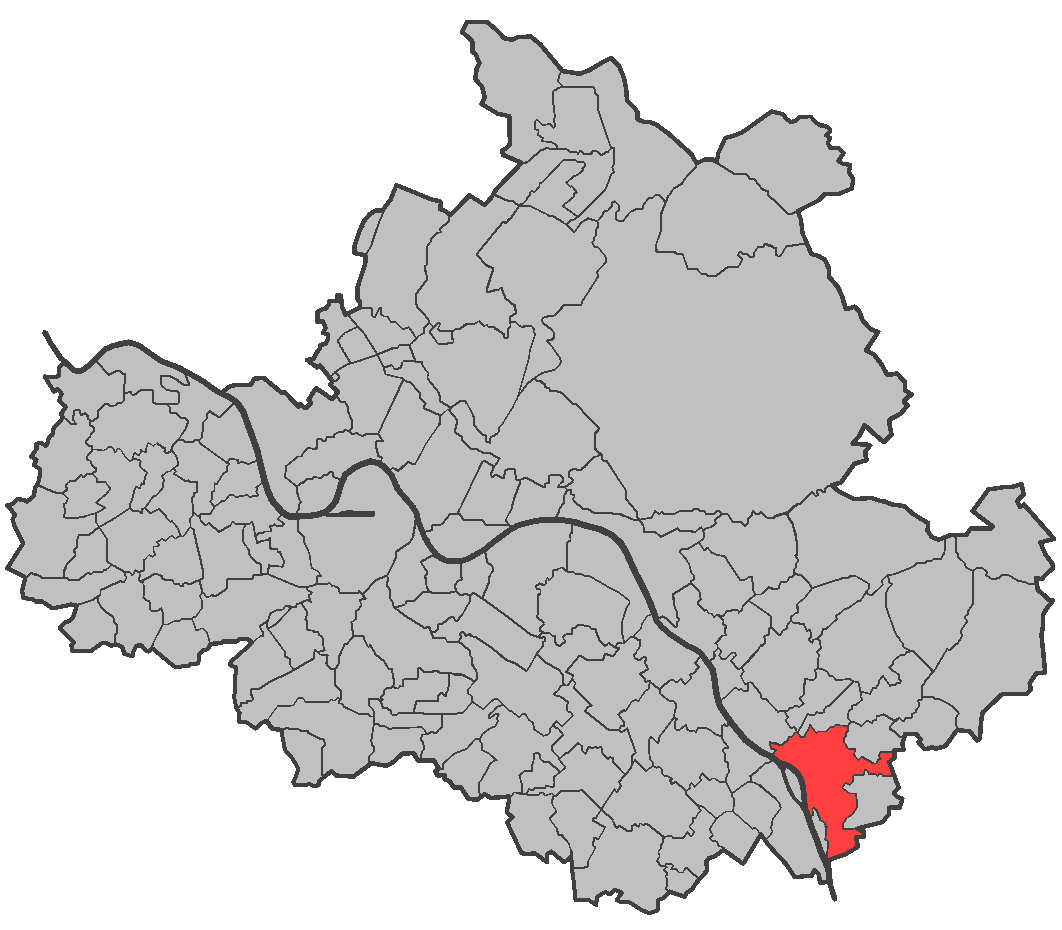
- Location of the quarter of Pillnitz in Dresden
- Interactive map of Pillnitz
- Location within Germany Location within Saxony
- Coordinates: 51°00′46″N 13°52′22″E
- Country: Germany
- State: Saxony
- District: Urban district
- City: Dresden
- Borough: Loschwitz

Population (2020-12-31)
  - Total: 3,392
- Time zone: UTC+01:00 (CET)
  - Summer (DST): UTC+02:00 (CEST)
- Vehicle registration: DD

Pillnitz (German pronunciation: [ˈpɪlnɪts]) is a quarter in the east of Dresden, Germany. It can be reached by bus, ship, walking along the river or by bicycle. Pillnitz is most famous for its Baroque palace and park, the Pillnitz Castle.

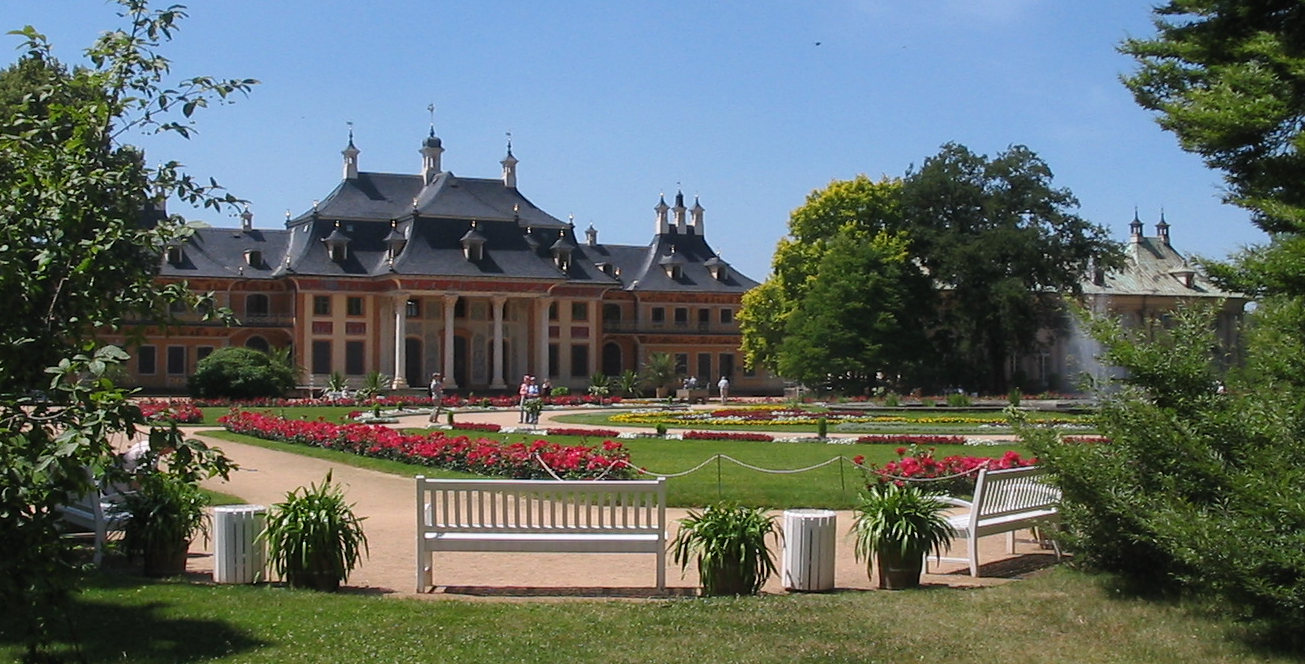
Pillnitz Palace, Bergpalais (Upper Palace)

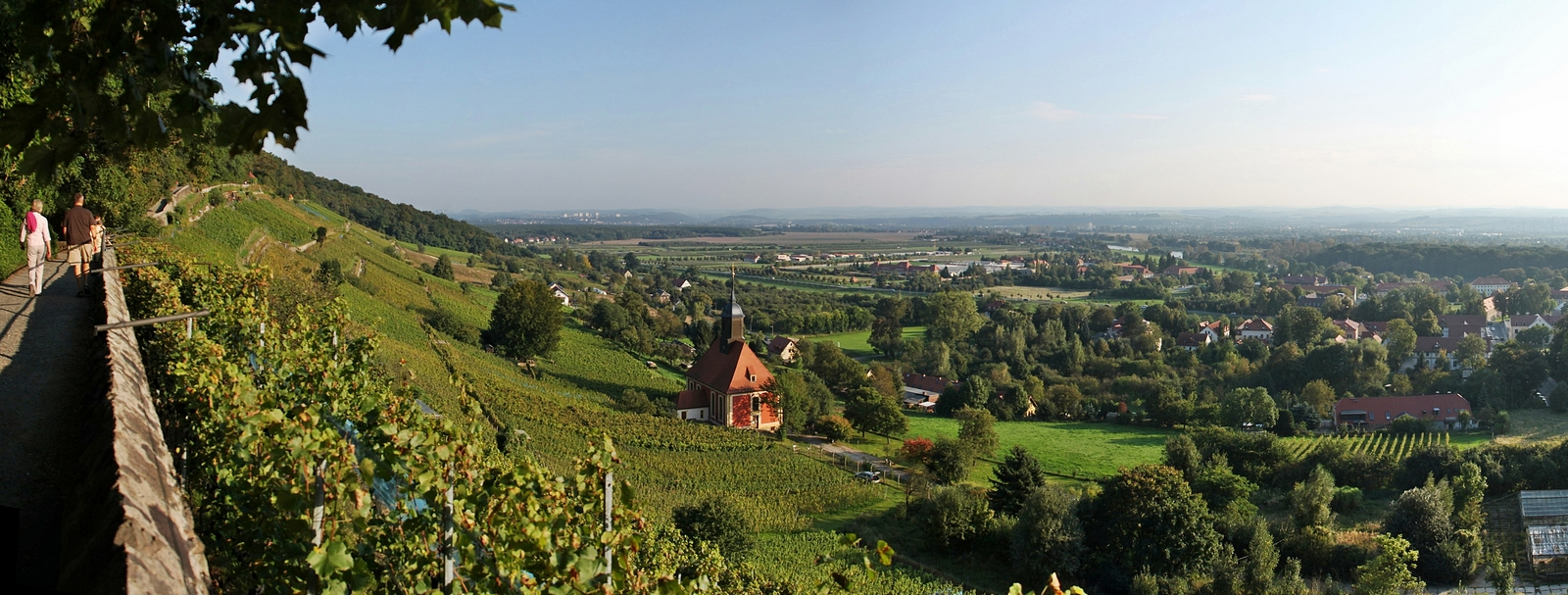
Vineyard in Pillnitz with Church of the Holy Spirit

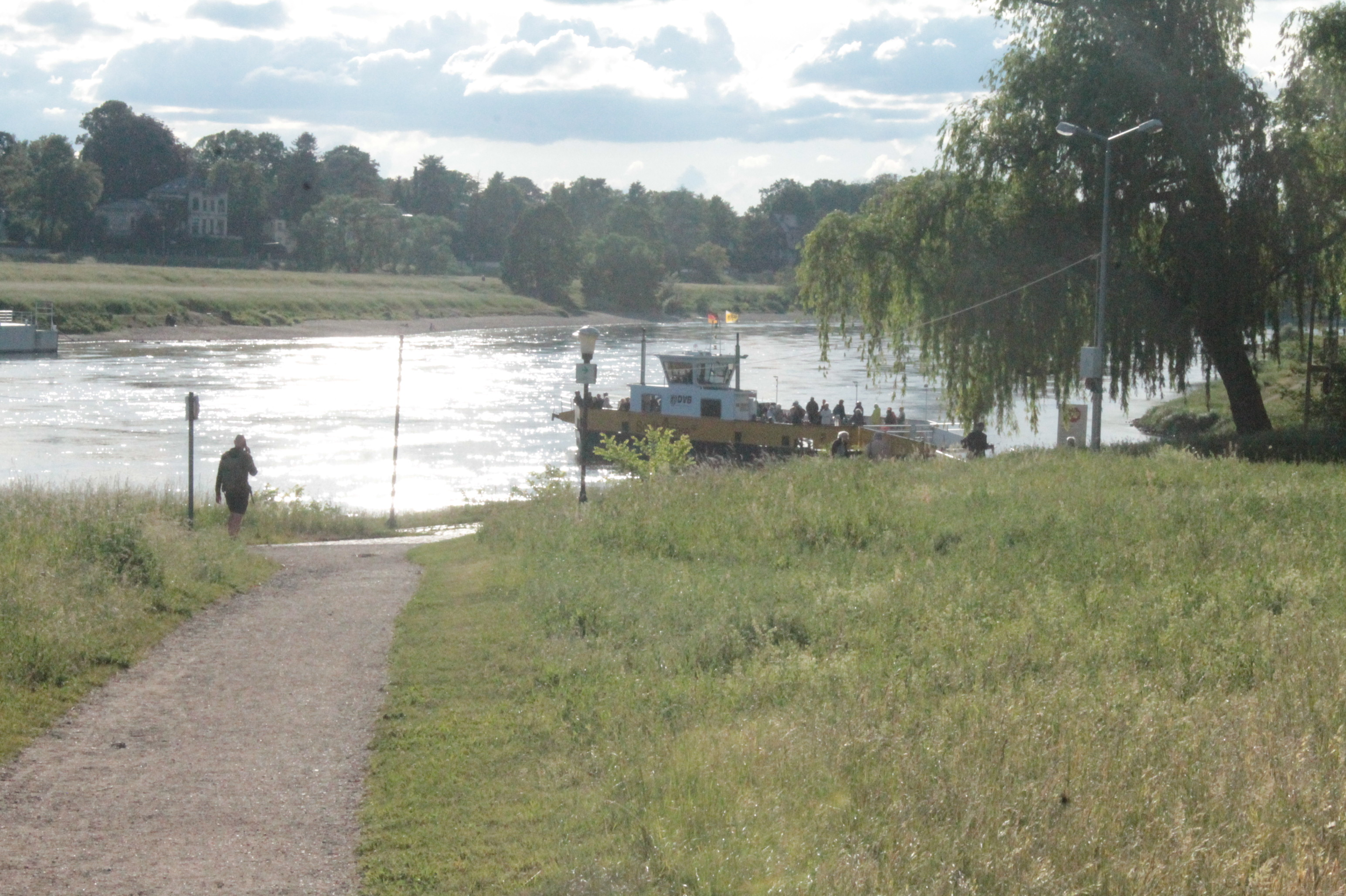
The ferry at Pillnitz, Dresden

Pillnitz Palace consists of the Riverside Palace (Wasserpalais) at the river, the parallel Upper Palace (Bergpalais) towards the hills and the linking building New Palace (Neues Palais). The first two were designed by Matthäus Daniel Pöppelmann. The buildings frame the Baroque inner garden; this entire ensemble is surrounded by a park.

Pillnitz is known for the Declaration of Pillnitz of 1791: Emperor Leopold II and King Frederick William II of Prussia, urged by Charles, Comte d'Artois, declared that the French King Louis XVI was not to be harmed or deprived of power as a way to attack the progress of the French Revolution.

Pillnitz is also a site of wine production. During the millennium flood of 2002 in Dresden, it was one of the most affected areas.

== See also ==
- Pillnitz Castle
- White Fleet armada of Dresden
- Elbhangfest
