= Willy Katz =

German physician (1878 - 1947)

Willy Katz (born December 17, 1878, in Brieg; died January 13, 1947, in Dresden) was a German physician. From 1939 onward, he was the only licensed Jewish “Krankenbehandler” in Dresden and one of 22 verifiably licensed Jewish doctors in Saxony. After initial skepticism, Victor Klemperer befriended him and wrote about Katz several times in his diaries.

== Life ==
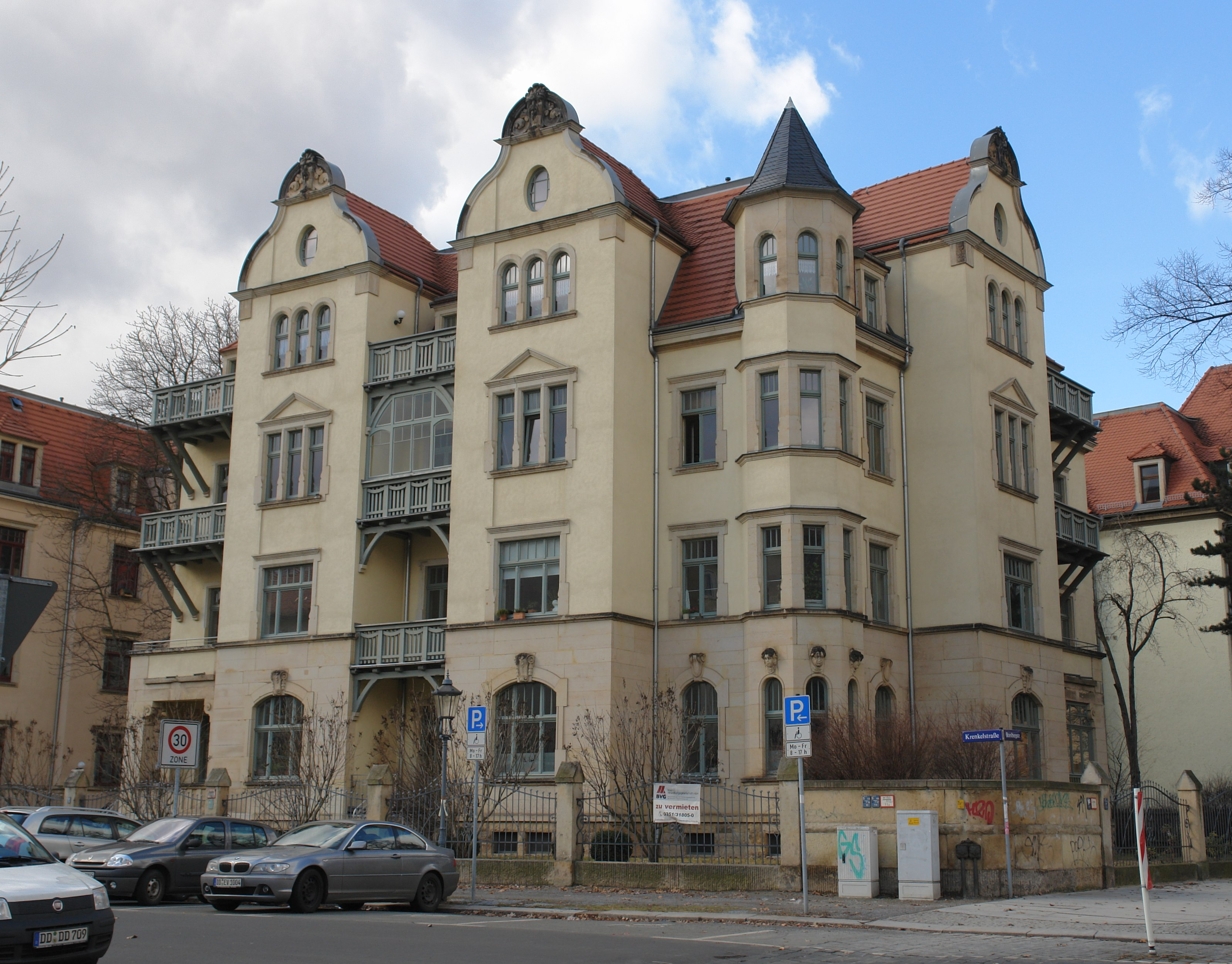
Villa Borsbergstraße 14, die Praxis von Willy Katz

Willy Katz was born in Brieg near Breslau in 1878, but the family moved to Berlin, where Katz graduated from Sophien-Gymnasium in 1897. He studied medicine in Berlin and Vienna until 1905 and successfully completed his doctorate at the University of Greifswald the following year. He then worked as an assistant doctor for his uncle Ludwig Katz at the ear clinic in Berlin and became a senior physician at sanatoriums in Bad Homburg vor der Höhe and Wiesbaden. He also worked as a doctor in Mainz. From 1909, Katz worked as a general practitioner with his own clinic in Dresden, which was finally located at Borsbergstraße 14 after a change of location.

Katz took part in the First World War as a staff doctor in the reserves - an experience that for him was “a great event, as an adventure and complete togetherness with the Germans”, as Victor Klemperer noted in his diary in 1943. He was awarded the Iron Cross I and II Class; as late as 1937, he received the Silver Badge of Honour from the Reich Association of Jewish Frontline Soldiers. In addition to his work as a general practitioner, Katz was active in numerous clubs and was particularly dedicated to sports medicine. As head of the sports medical advice center, he “rendered outstanding services to the establishment of a sports medical advice system in Dresden.”

After the National Socialists seized power, Katz initially retained his health insurance license as a participant in the First World War. In October 1933, he married his partner, who was not Jewish and later refused to divorce Katz despite harassment and hostility. It became increasingly difficult for Katz to work as a doctor; he was excluded from professional and scientific associations, was no longer allowed to carry out expert opinions as a doctor who did not belong to the Nazi Medical Association and finally lost his license to practice medicine on September 30, 1938, like all Jewish doctors, and was forced to close his practice. Katz was arrested several times during the Kristallnacht in 1938.

In July 1939, the Kassenärztliche Vereinigung der Bezirksstelle Groß-Dresden informed the Dresden health insurance funds that Katz had been engaged as a “health care provider” for Dresden's Jewish employees:

Since a large number of Jews have been reintegrated into the work process and are therefore compulsorily insured with the health insurance funds, it is unavoidable that a Jewish doctor should be entrusted with the care of these members. We have therefore informed Dr. Willy Katz [...] that he is to take over the treatment of Jewish compulsorily insured persons with immediate effect. - Notice from the Association of Statutory Health Insurance Physicians of the Greater Dresden District Office 1939

Katz was thus the only licensed Jewish “health practitioner” in Dresden and one of 22 verifiably licensed Jewish “health practitioners” in Saxony after 1938, 18 of whom worked in Leipzig, two in Chemnitz and one in Görlitz. As head of the “Jewish Health Office”, he reopened his practice at Borsbergstraße 14 on July 7, 1939, although he was under constant observation by the Gestapo. Katz was responsible for treating the workers in his practice and had a bad reputation among the Jews of Dresden. Klemperer noted in his diary in 1942 that Katz was considered a “shyster”, who he had heard “did not declare anyone unfit for work out of fear." “The Jew Katz is said to be impossible”, Klemperer noted in March 1942, but remarked in May 1942 that Katz “obviously has a very difficult position between the supervising Gestapo and the Jewish community [and] a very bad press among those who depend on him.” Klemperer and he had been on friendly terms since May 1942, even if Klemperer still had a bad impression of him at the time. In July 1942, Klemperer and Katz got to know each other better, had intellectual conversations, talked about their time in the military and became friends. From this time onwards, Klemperer tried to “have a balancing effect” between Katz and the patients.

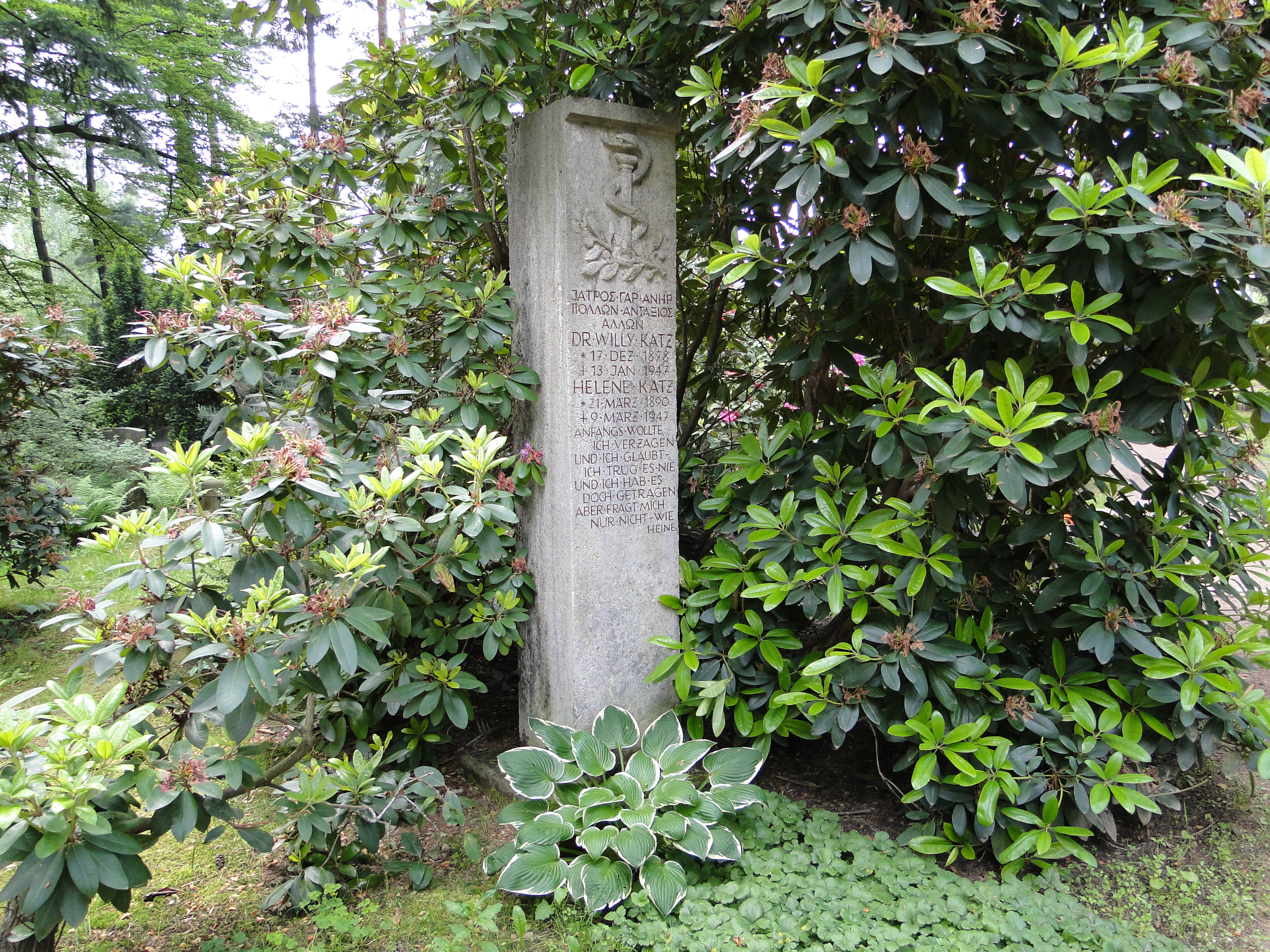
Grave of Willy Katz in Urnenhain Tolkewitz

Katz was the school doctor at the Jewish school and doctor at the Henriettenstift. He was responsible for the medical supervision of the more than 30 so-called “Jews' houses” in Dresden. He was also appointed camp doctor at the Hellerberg Jewish camp from November 1942 until the deportation of the forced laborers in March 1943. During this time, he campaigned for better hygienic conditions in the camp; Klemperer reports in his diary how Katz provided a midwife for a pregnant woman in the camp, how he organized bathtubs for the camp and campaigned for an “improvement of the latrines”.

After the Wannsee Conference in June 1942, Katz was obliged to examine the Jews remaining in Dresden for their “ability to walk”. He had to accompany at least ten deportations from Dresden to the Theresienstadt concentration camp as a doctor. He was able to save a few people from deportation.

After the end of the war, Katz continued his work as a doctor, although he was physically and mentally severely affected, suffering from chronic tuberculosis. He was appointed medical officer in Striesen and Blasewitz by the new state government and proposed as head of the municipal health department in 1946. Katz had already fallen ill with pneumonia and pleurisy in the winter of 1945 and died as a result in January 1947. He was buried in the Tolkewitz cemetery; Victor Klemperer delivered the eulogy. Katz's gravestone was restored in 2011 using donations. Willy Katz's preserved estate, including some of his medical instruments, has been in the Washington Holocaust Museum since 1990.

On the initiative of the Saxon State Medical Association, a memorial plaque was unveiled in front of his former residence and practice on June 25, 2015.

== Literature ==
- Caris-Petra Heidel: Der Arzt und Sportmediziner Willy Katz. In: Ärzteblatt Sachsen, Nr. 11, 2013, S. 473–476.
- Katz, Willy. In: Volker Klimpel: Dresdner Ärzte. Hellerau, Dresden 1998, S. 82.
