= Schwebebahn =

Schwebebahn is German for suspension railway and may refer to the following examples in Germany:

- Schwebebahn Dresden, the Dresden Suspension Railway in Dresden, Saxony
- Schwebebahn Wuppertal, the Wuppertal Suspension Railway in Wuppertal, North Rhine-Westphalia
