= Sächsische Dampfschiffahrt =

Coordinates: 51°03′14″N 13°44′34″E

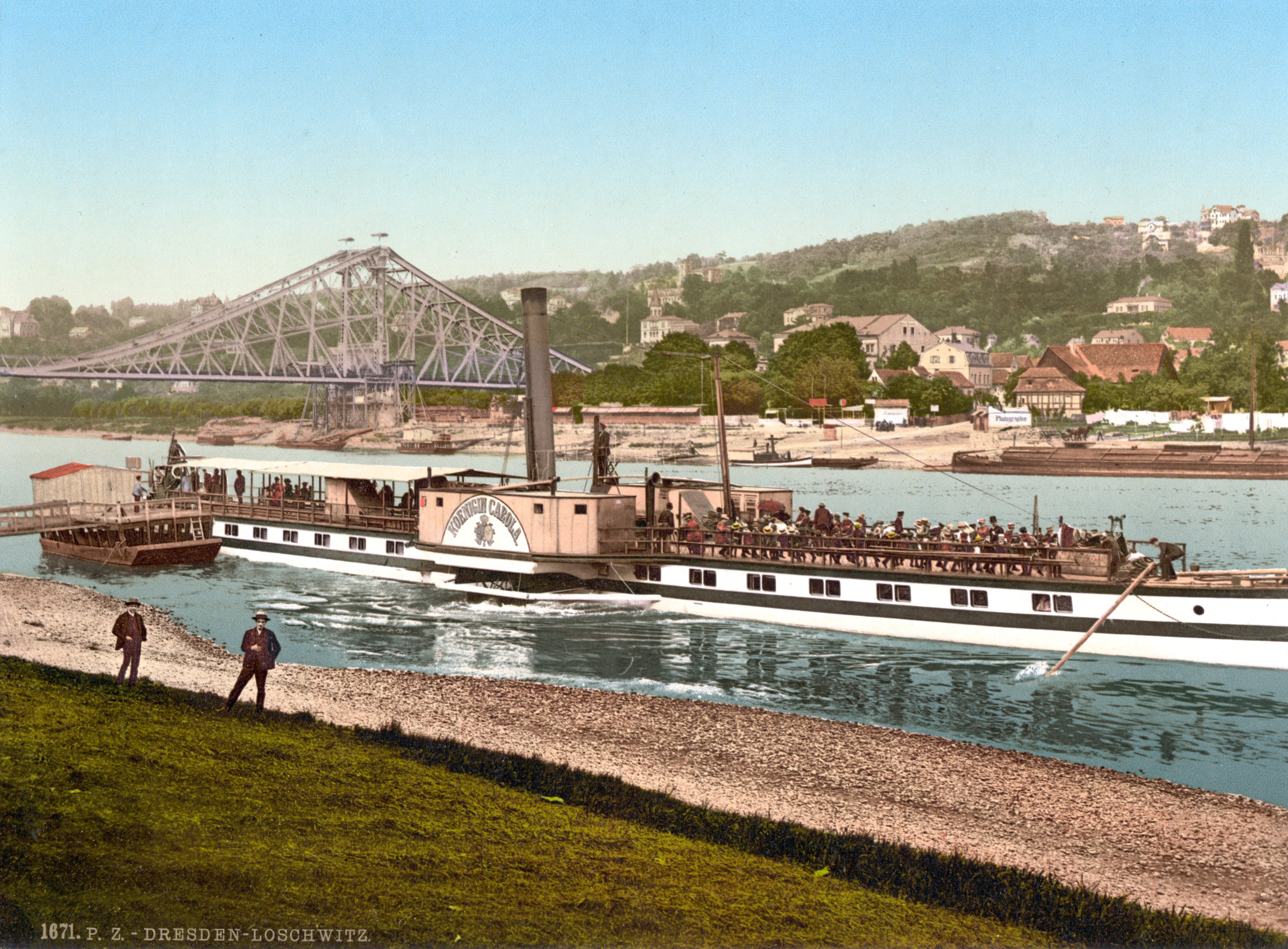
Dresden at the Blaues Wunder bridge. View from the Blasewitz quarter to Loschwitz on the other side.

The Sächsische Dampfschiffahrt of Dresden, Germany is the oldest and biggest paddle steamer fleet in the world. It consists of nine wheel steamers, two salon ships and two motor ships. It was formerly known as the White Fleet (Weisse Flotte in German).

All the ships in the fleet are named after Saxon towns and cities or Saxon people such as August the Strong. The ships connect Meißen via Dresden to Saxon Switzerland along the river Elbe where they pass castles, vineyards and villa quarters.
