= Elbhangfest =

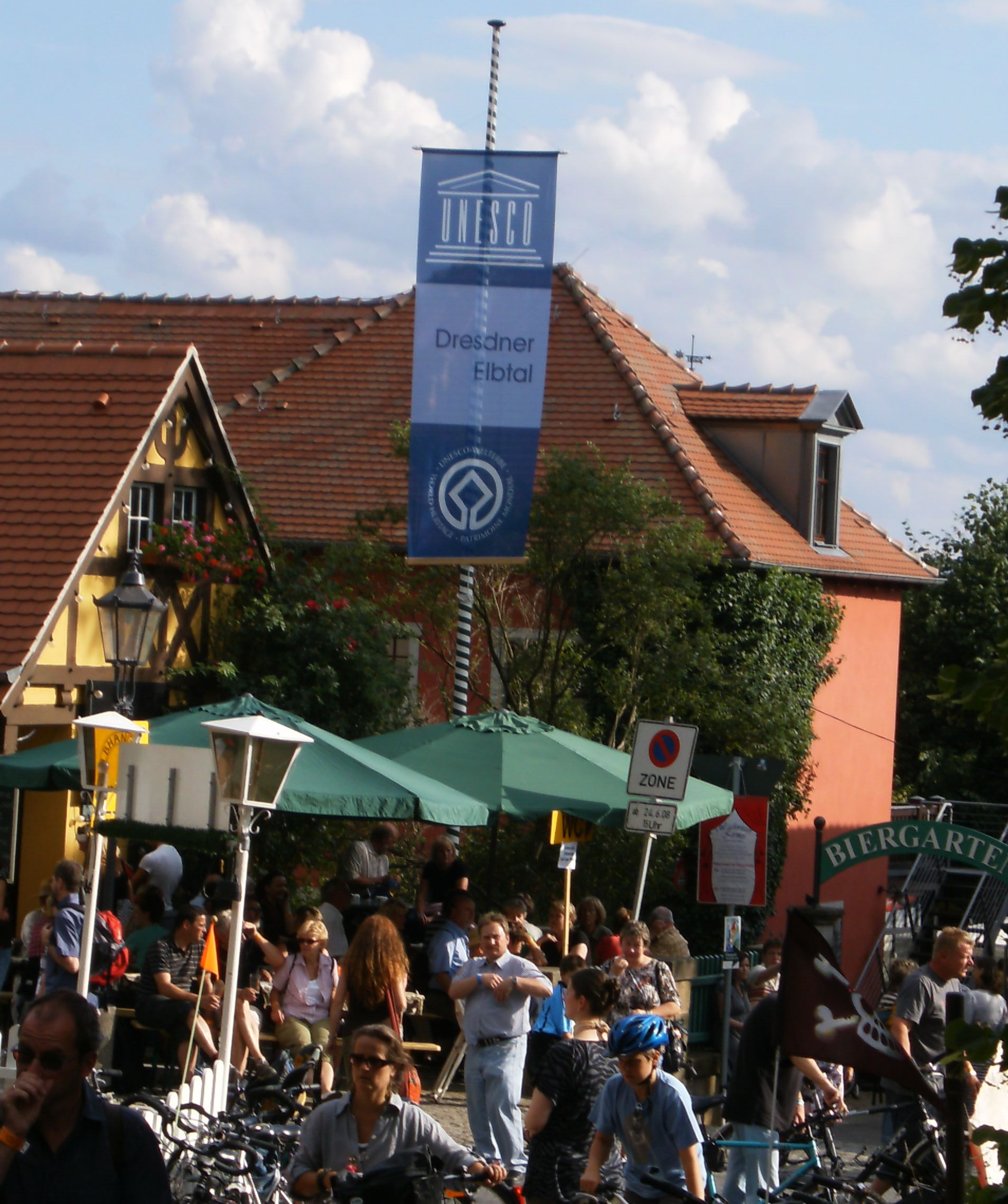
Elbhangfest 2008 in village Wachwitz (Dresden)

The Elbhangfest is a street festival held in Dresden, Germany on the last weekend of June each year since 1990, focusing on the unique culture and built landscape of the hillsides on the banks of the Elbe river.

== Description ==
The area between a bridge in Loschwitz called 'Blaues Wunder' (Blue Wonder) and Pillnitz Castle is the site for a street festival where a variety of performers come together to entertain the crowds of locals and visitors.
