= Dresden Funicular Railway =

Railway in Dresden, Germany

Coordinates: 51°03′19″N 13°48′58″E

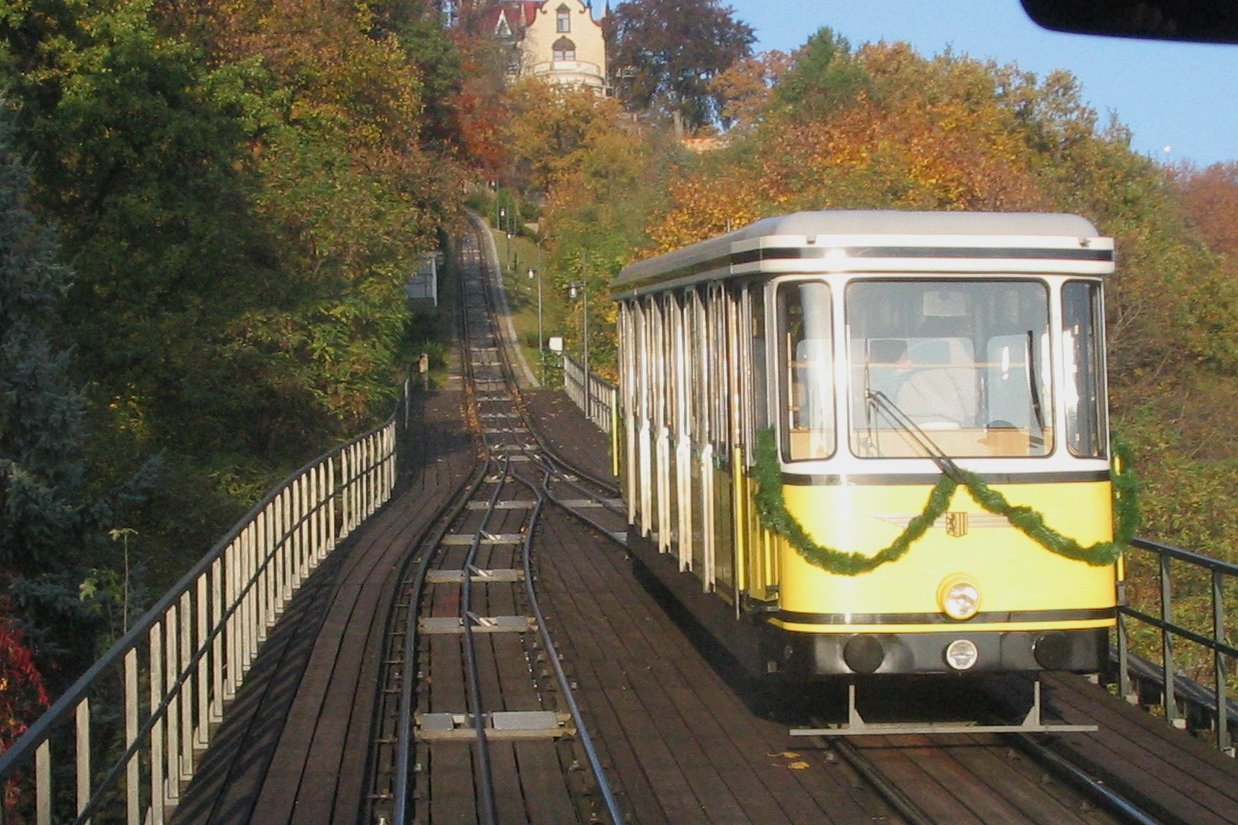

Service
- Type: Funicular

Technical
- Track length: 547 metres (1,795 ft)
- Rack system: Abt
- Track gauge: 1,000 mm (3 ft 3 3/8 in) metre gauge
- Maximum incline: 29%

The Dresden Funicular Railway (German: Standseilbahn Dresden) is a funicular in Dresden, Germany, connecting the districts of Loschwitz, near the "Blue Wonder" bridge, and Weisser Hirsch.

The railway is one of two funicular railways in Dresden, the other being the unusual Schwebebahn Dresden, a suspended monorail. Both lines are operated by the Dresdner Verkehrsbetriebe AG, which also operate the city's tram, bus and ferry networks.

== History ==
Although the construction of the line had been discussed and planned since 1873, the permit to build the railway was not issued until 1893. The railway was opened on October 26, 1895, and was originally run by a steam engine.

In 1910 the line was converted to run on electricity, and in 1912 its operation was transferred to the Dresden municipal tramways, whose successors still operate it. During the bombing of Dresden on the 13 February 1945, the lower station of the funicular was destroyed. However the cars had been moved into the line's tunnels for safety, and survived.

Major renewals took place in 1978 and 1993. On January 6, 2014, the line was again closed for a major refurbishment of both the cars and the line. The refurbishment was expected to be completed by April, 2014 and to cost €350,000.

== Operation ==
The funicular operates between 06:30 and 21:00 on weekdays, and between 09:00 and 21:00 at weekends and public holidays. During operating hours there are between four and six journeys per hour in each direction.

The line has the following technical parameters:

Number of cars	2
Number of stops	2
Configuration	Single track with passing loop
Traction	Electricity
Track length	547 metres (1,795 ft)
Rise	94 metres (308 ft)
Maximum gradient	29%
Track gauge	1,000 mm (3 ft 3 3/8 in) metre gauge
Speed	5 metres per second (16 ft/s)
Journey time	5 mins
Capacity	60 passengers per car; 630 persons per hour per direction
Tunnels	Burgberg: 96 metres (315 ft); Prinzess Louisa: 54 metres (177 ft)
Viaduct	102 metres (335 ft)

== Gallery ==
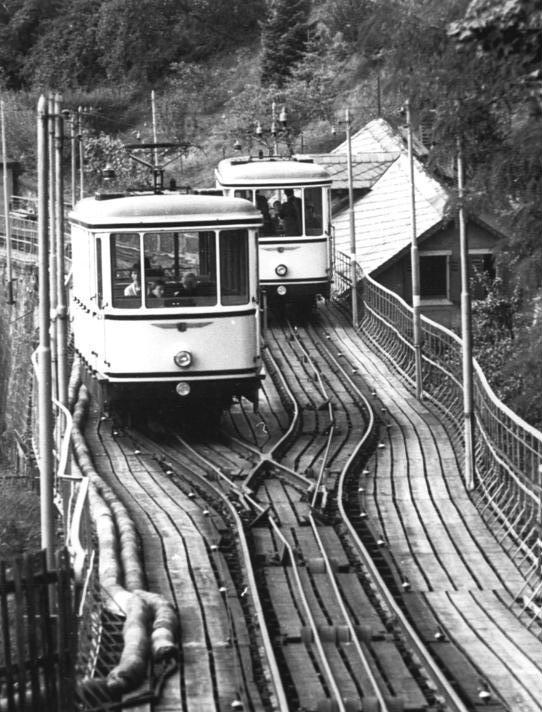
Abt switch used in 1895 built Dresden Funicular Railway (photo of 1985)

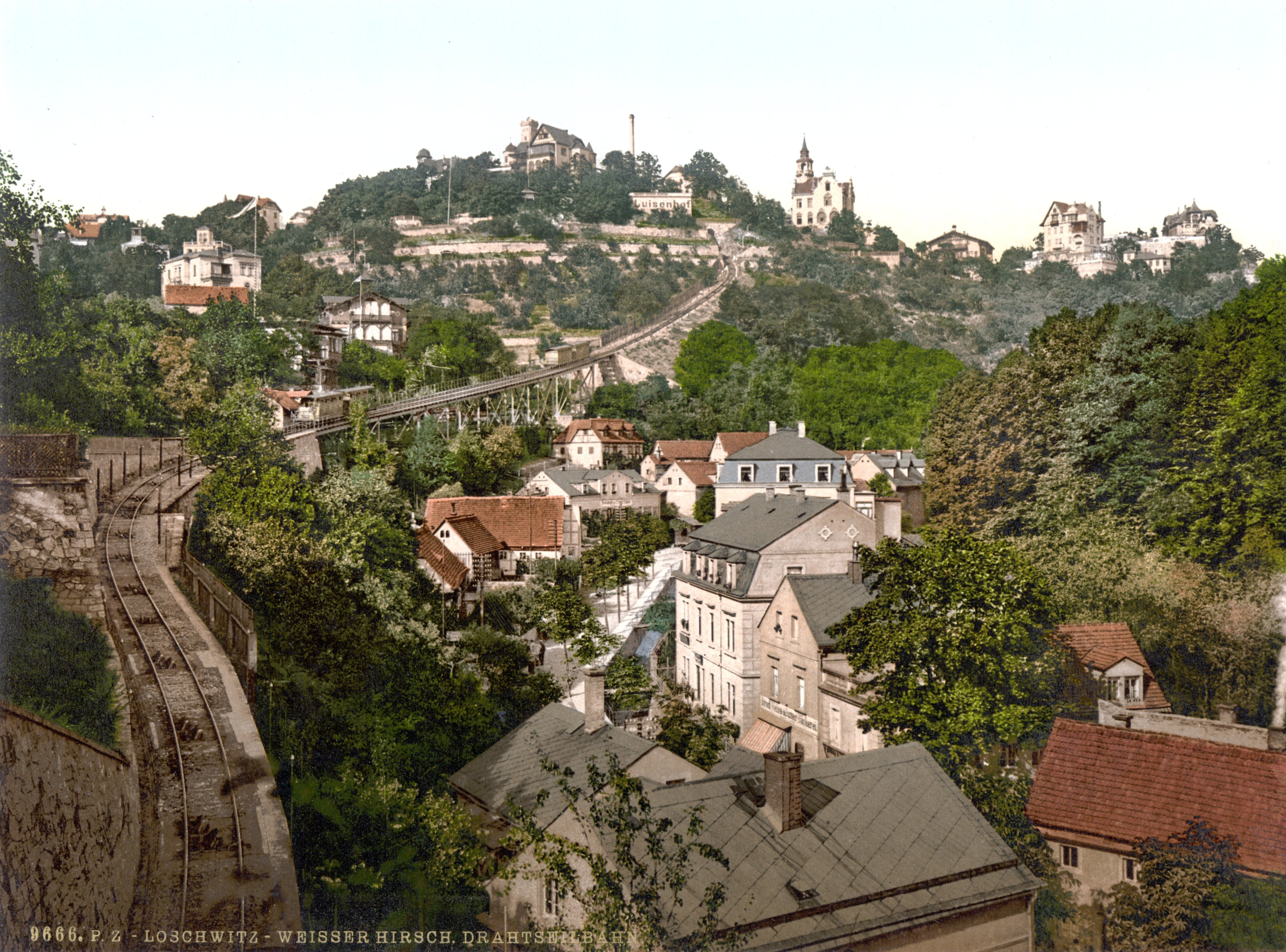
The line in 1910

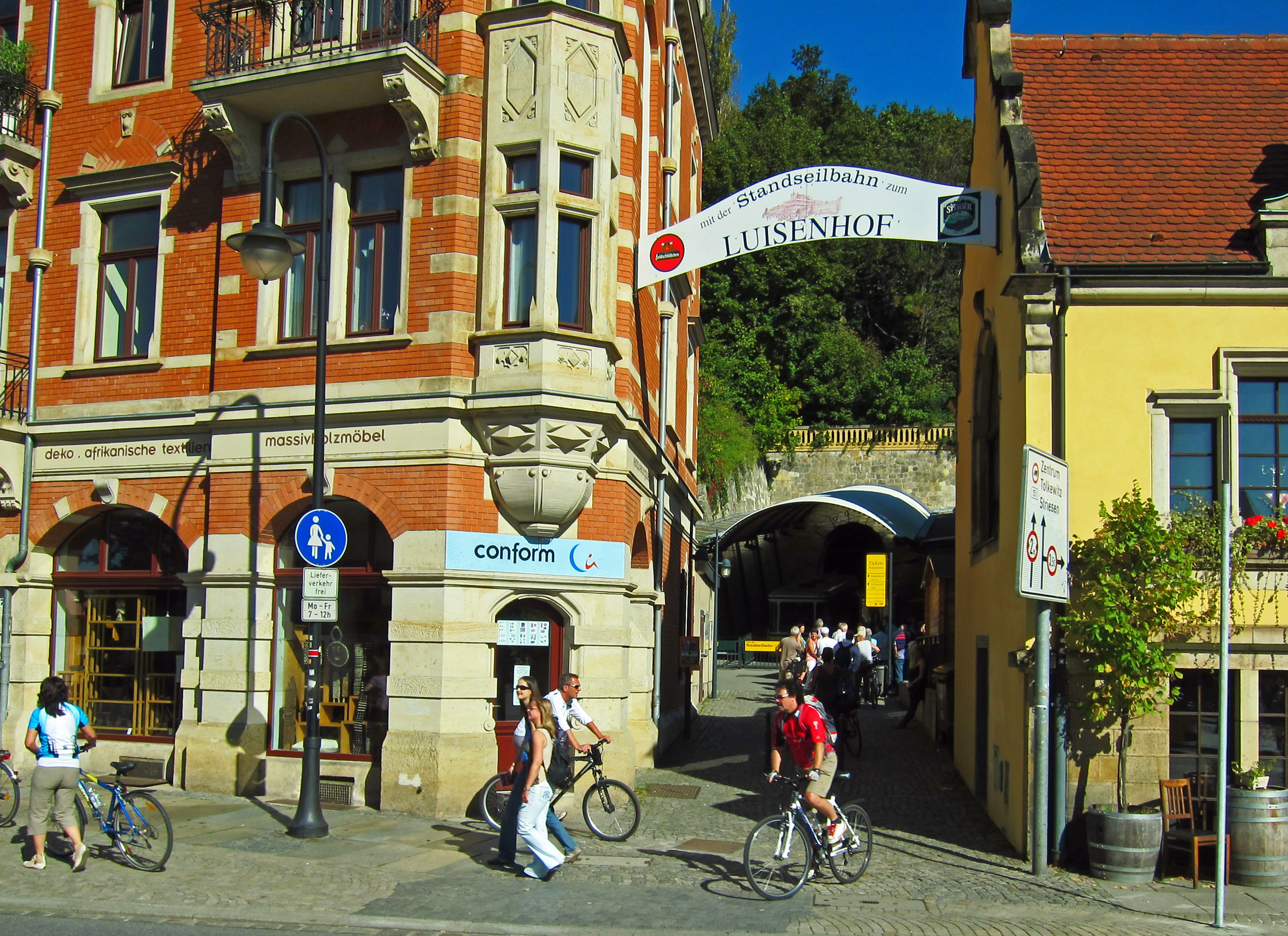
Entrance to lower station

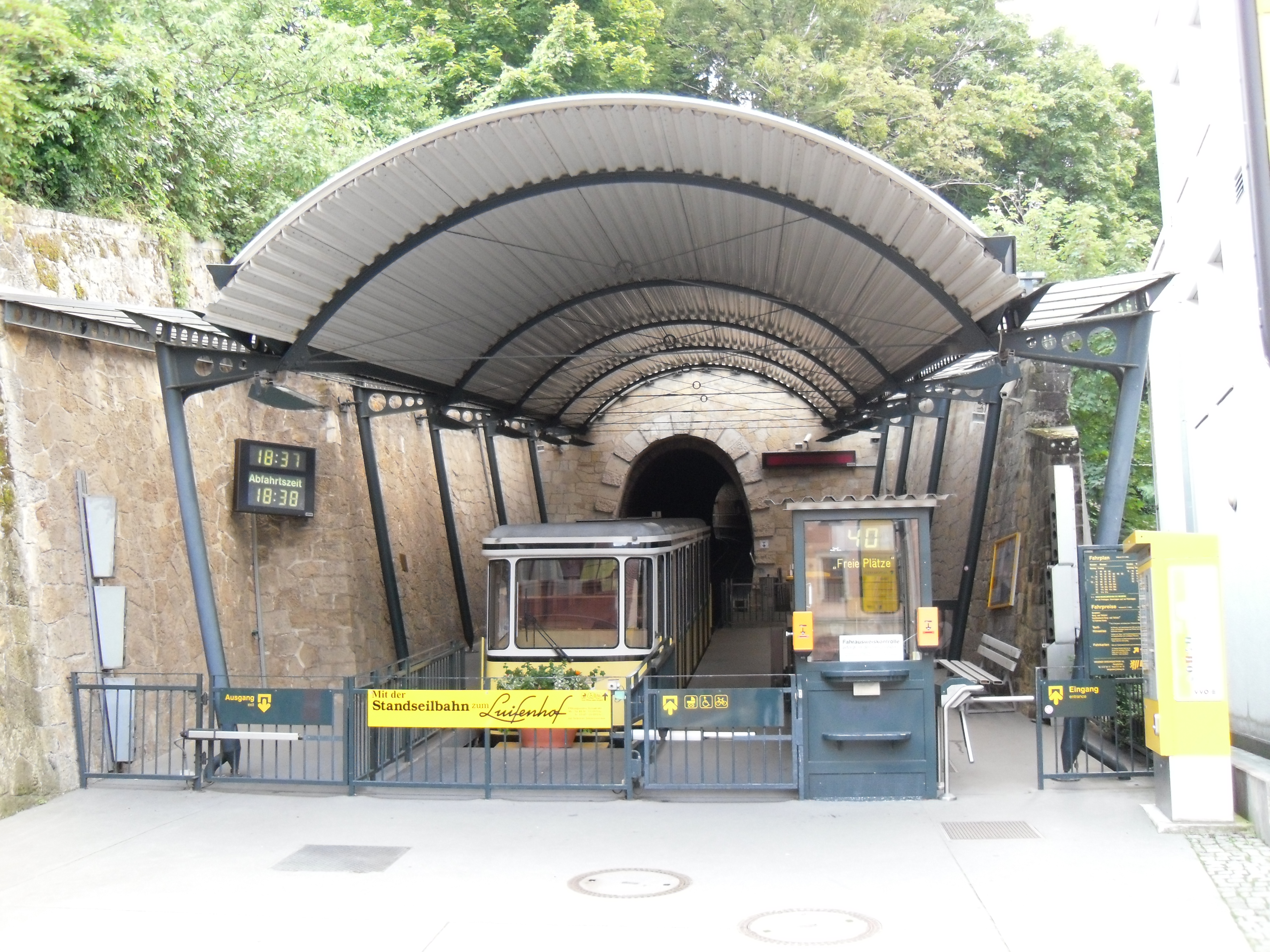
The lower station

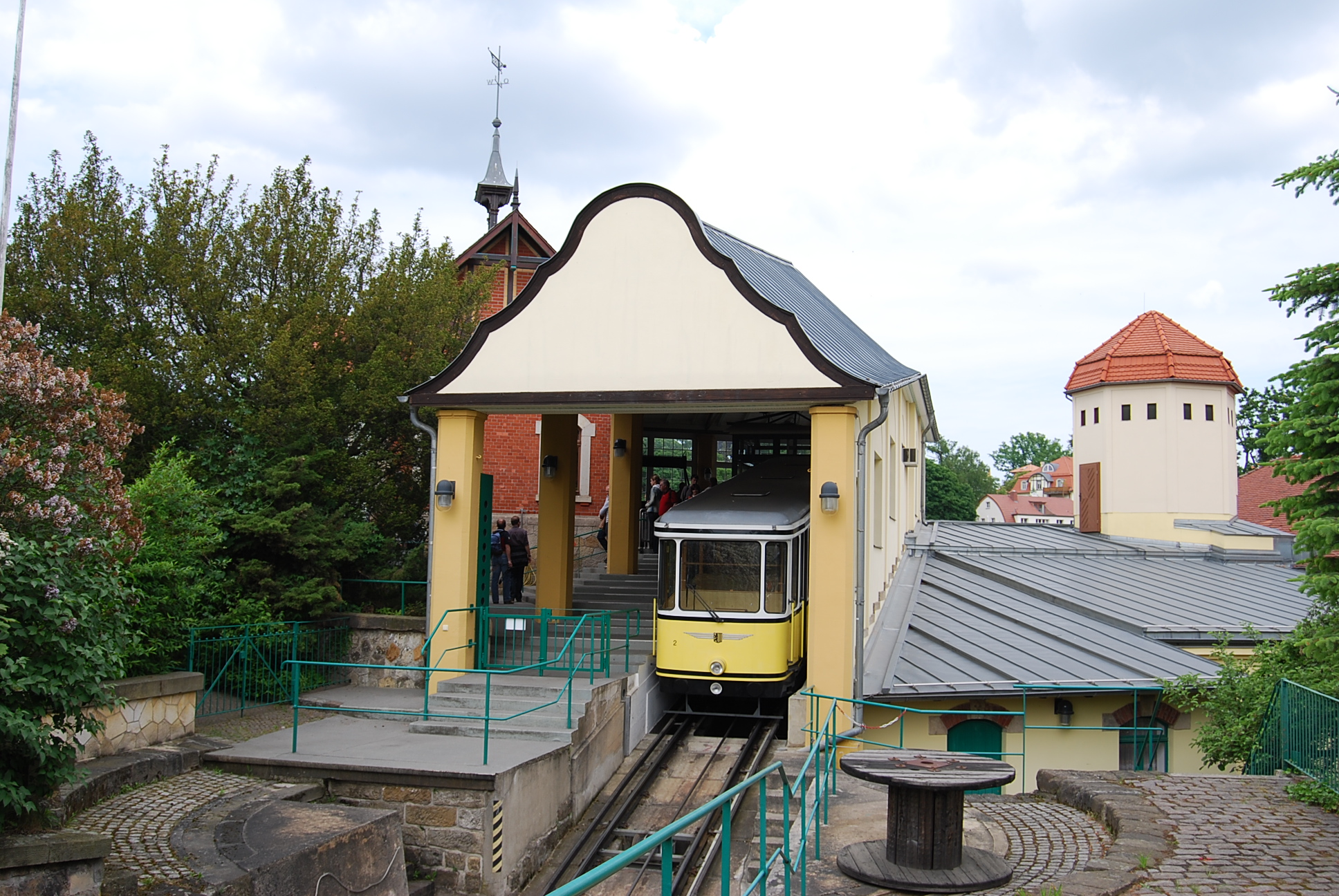
The upper station

== See also ==
- List of funicular railways
