= Blasewitz =

- Borough of Dresden
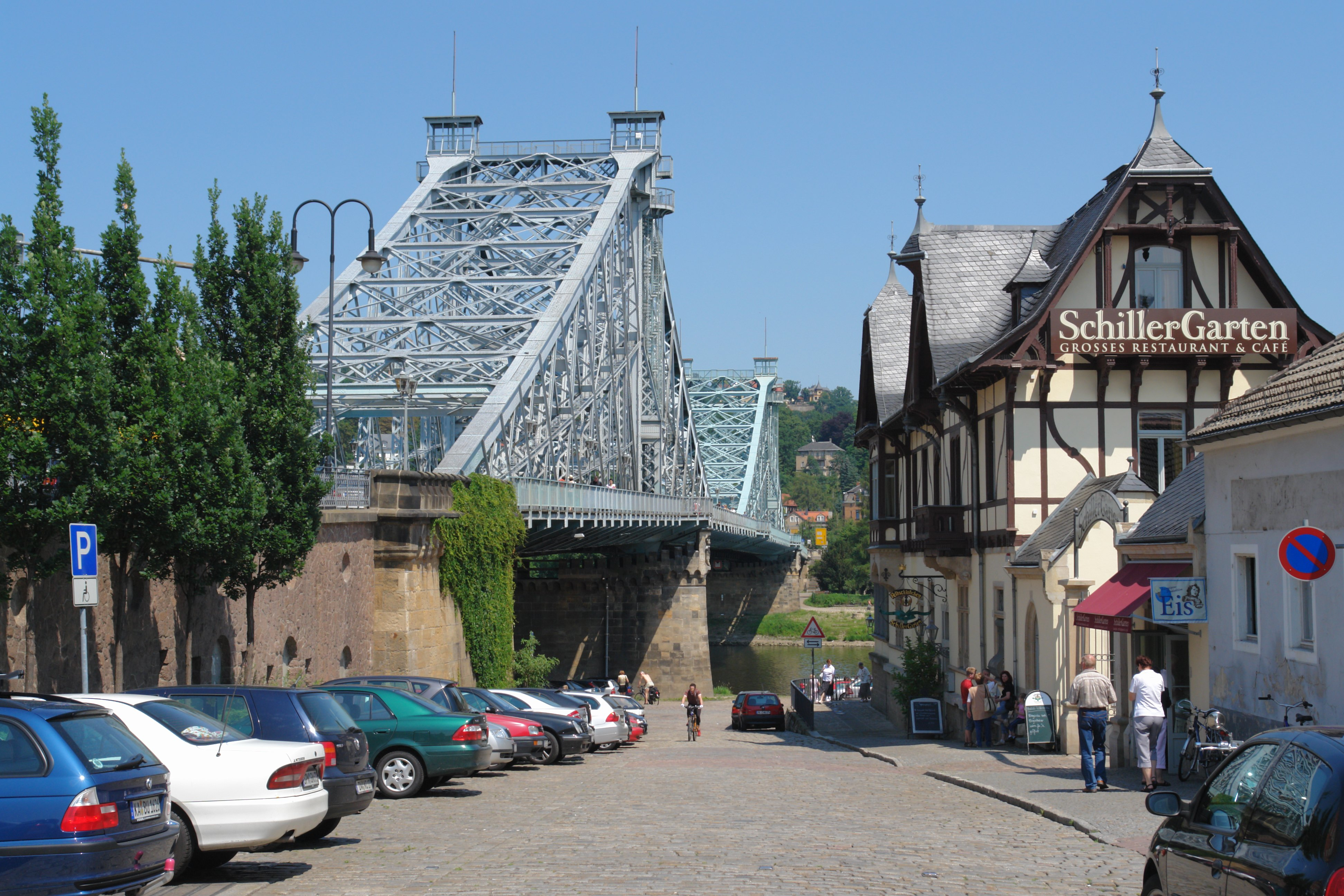
- Blue Wonder bridge from Schillerplatz

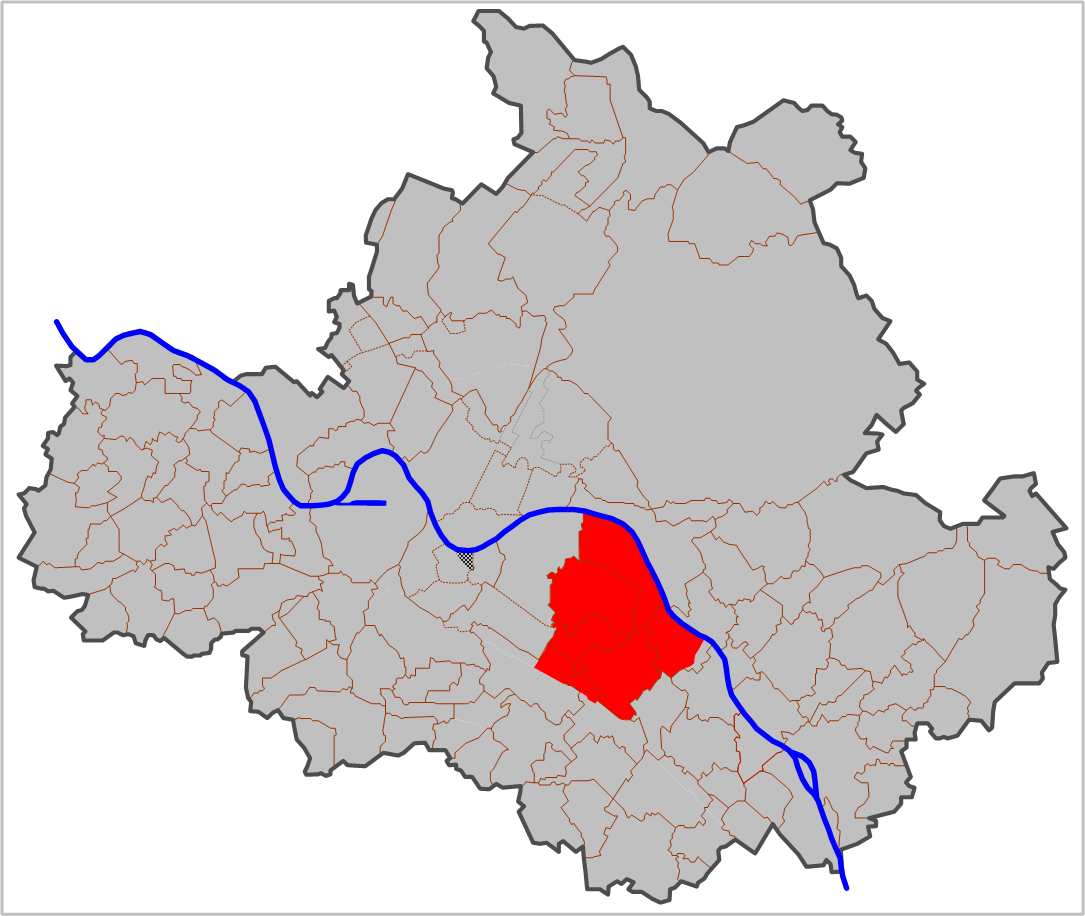
- Location of Blasewitz in Dresden
- Interactive map of Blasewitz
- Location within Germany Location within Saxony
- Coordinates: 51°3′10″N 13°47′45″E
- Country: Germany
- State: Saxony
- District: Urban district
- City: Dresden

Area
  - Total: 14.48 km^{2} (5.59 sq mi)

Population (2020-12-31)
  - Total: 88,880
  - Density: 6,138/km^{2} (15,900/sq mi)
- Time zone: UTC+01:00 (CET)
  - Summer (DST): UTC+02:00 (CEST)
- Dialling codes: 0351
- Vehicle registration: DD

Blasewitz (German pronunciation: [ˈblaːzəvɪts]) is a larger borough (Stadtbezirk) of Dresden, Germany in the city's eastern centre on the Elbe river. It consists of seven quarters (Stadtteile):

- Blasewitz
- Striesen-Ost
- Striesen-Süd
- Striesen-West
- Tolkewitz/Seidnitz-Nord
- Seidnitz/Dobritz
- Gruna

Blasewitz is connected to the borough of Loschwitz north of the river Elbe by the Blue Wonder (Blaues Wunder) bridge, Johannstadt to the west, Striesen to the south, and Tolkewitz to the east. Blasewitz, Loschwitz and Weißer Hirsch form the core of a bigger city area which is known as Germany's largest coherent urban territory architecturally dominated by historic villas. As well as nearby quarters as Wachwitz and Kleinzschachwitz, they were all struck in World War II by the allied bombings but much less than others located closer to the city center. The destruction of whole streets ended at the street Fetscherstraße, which denotes the beginning of the described villa area. It is the biggest but not the only one of its kind in Dresden.

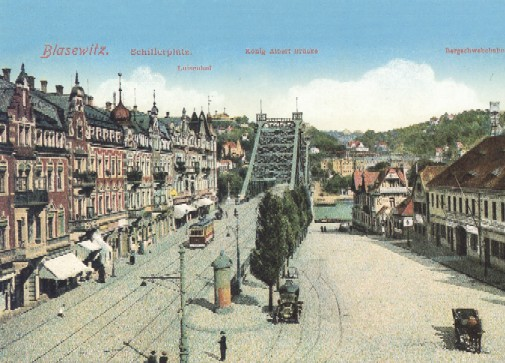
Schillerplatz and Blue Wonder, around 1910

Blasewitz was first mentioned in 1349. The village of fishermen and wine-growers developed into a suburb of Dresden in the Gründerzeit. Reasonably low taxes made it a popular residence for the wealthy until its incorporation.

Its main square is Schillerplatz, site of a movie theatre and Schillergalerie mall. Nearby is the Heilig-Geist-Kirche parish church, which was built in Neo-Gothic style in 1893 according to plans by Karl Emil Scherz. Friedrich Schiller eternalized Blasewitz in his play Wallensteins Lager where Justine Renner says: "Was der Blitz, das ist ja die Gustl von Blasewitz!" (Like the lightning that is the Gustl from Blasewitz).

The Gymnasium Kreuzschule which was first mentioned in 1216, and is thus almost as old as Dresden, has been located in Striesen/Blasewitz since 1945. The Carl Maria von Weber Gymnasium and the Dresden International School are in Blasewitz as well, as was the Martin Andersen Nexoe Gymnasium high school until it moved to Striesen in 2008. The Waldpark municipal forestry park provides recreational facilities with tennis courts. The quarter on the river is home to the rowing center of TU Dresden. There are a number of hostels and restaurants accompanied with a station of Sächsische Dampfschiffahrt.

The areas in proximity to the river, particularly east of the Blue Wonder/ Blaues Wunder bridge, were badly affected by so far all-time record floods which hit Dresden and surroundings in 2002. Purported due to large-scale flood protection measures Dresden largely and Blasewitz almost completely escaped the high tide of the Elbe in 2013. Down the river 2013 many water levels exceeded those of 2002 which got known as Dresden's millennium flood.
