= Loschwitz Bridge =

Loschwitzer Brücke Blaues Wunder
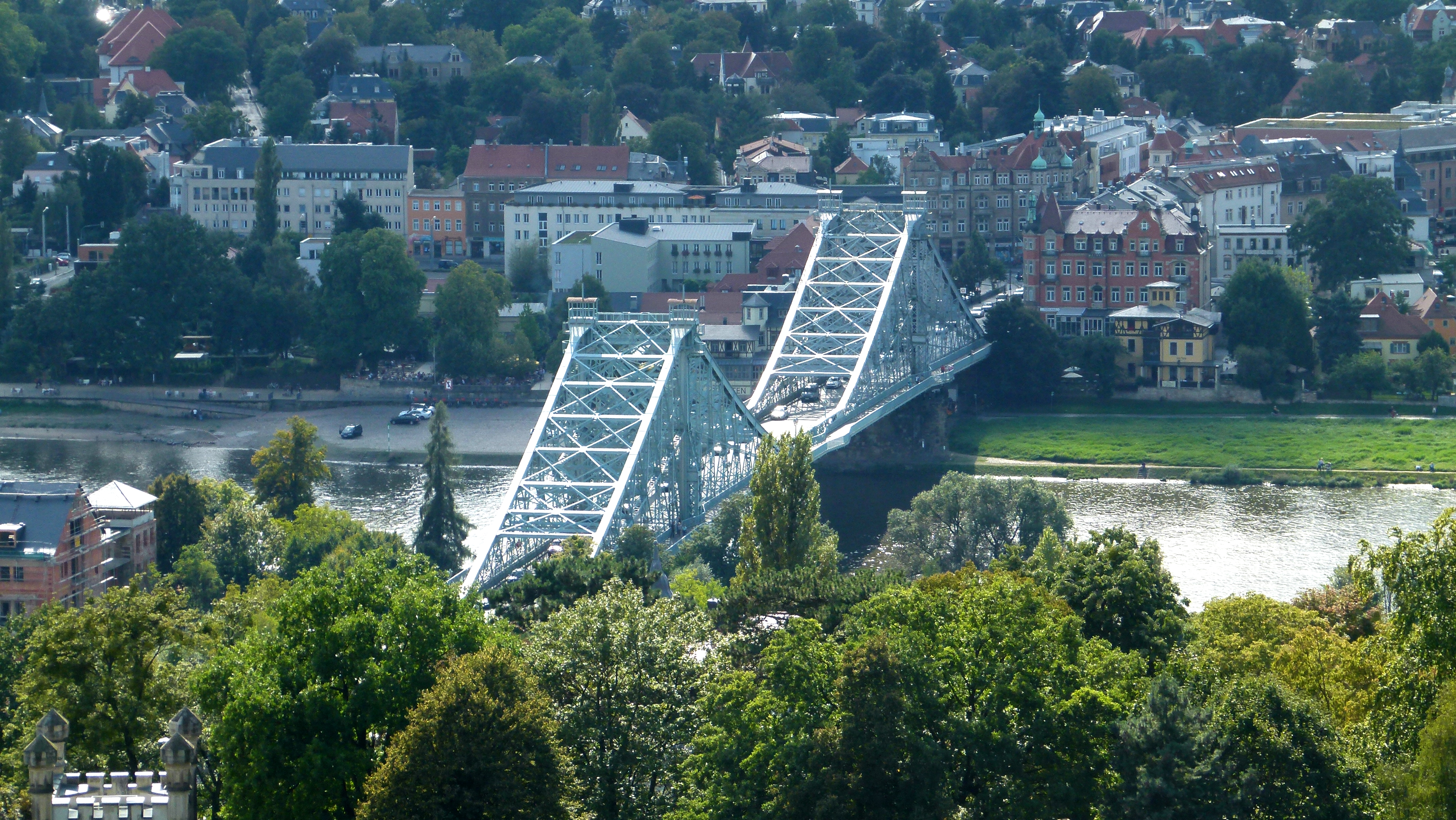
- Coordinates: 51°03′13″N 13°48′39″E
- Carries: Motor vehicles (up to 15 tonnes), trams (until 1985), pedestrians and bicycles
- Crosses: Elbe
- Locale: Dresden (Blasewitz–Loschwitz)
- Official name: Loschwitzer Brücke; König-Albert-Brücke (until 1912)
- Maintained by: Straßen- und Tiefbauamt Dresden

Characteristics
- Design: Cantilever
- Total length: 280 metres (920 ft)
- Width: 12 metres (39 ft)
- Longest span: 146 metres (479 ft)

History
- Designer: Claus Koepcke; Hans Manfred Krüger
- Opened: July 15, 1893

Statistics
- Toll: free since 1923

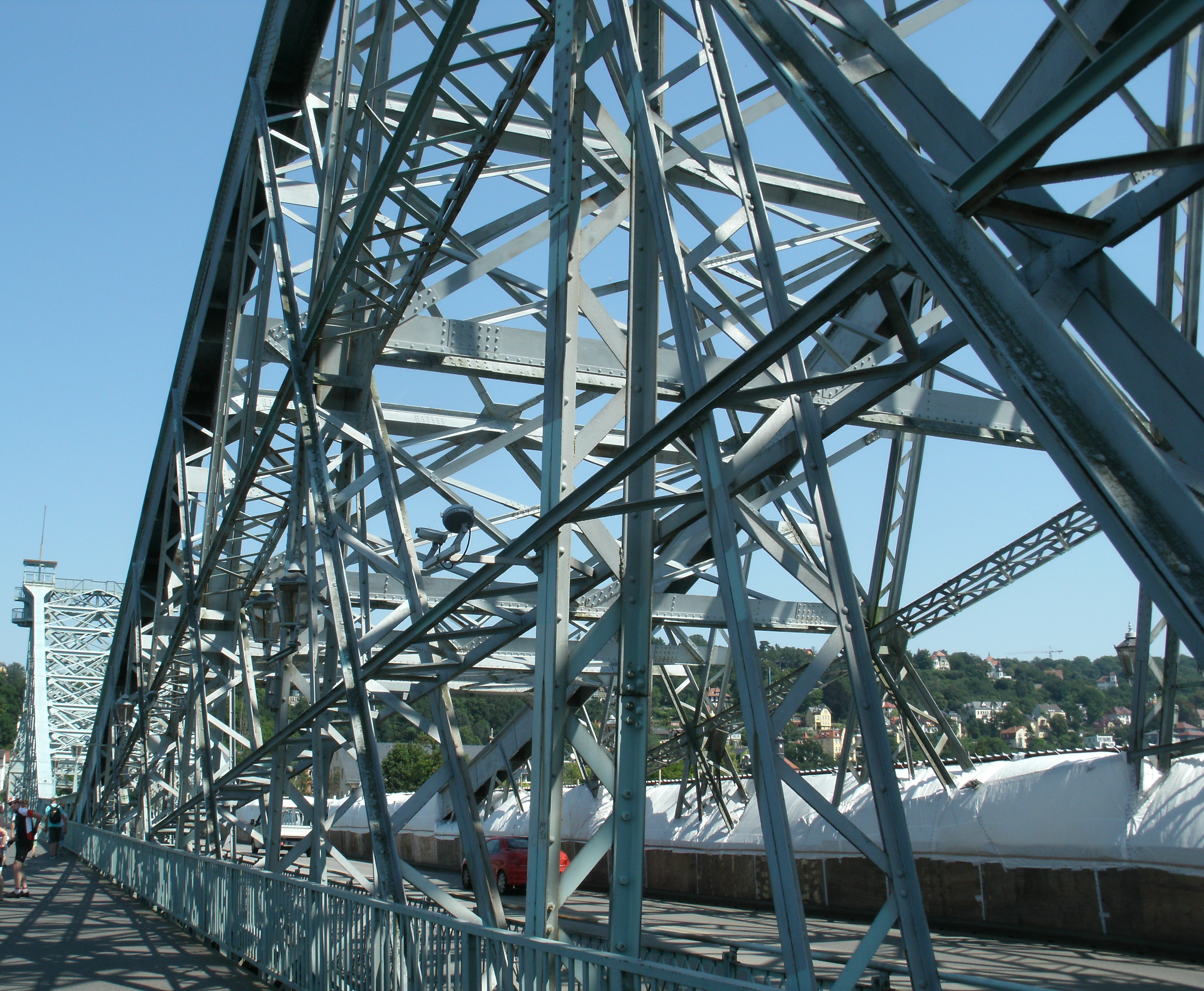
View of the half-timbered construction

Loschwitz Bridge (Loschwitzer Brücke) is a cantilever truss bridge over the river Elbe in Dresden the capital of Saxony in Germany. It connects the city districts of Blasewitz and Loschwitz, two affluent residential areas, which around 1900 were amongst the most expensive in Europe. It is located close to Standseilbahn Dresden funicular railway and the world's oldest suspension railway Schwebebahn Dresden, as well as near the Dresden TV tower. The bridge is colloquially referred to as Blaues Wunder ("Blue Wonder"). This common name purportedly referred to the bridge's original blue colour and being seen as a technological miracle at the time; it is also understood to carry the cynical connotation referencing the German idiom ein blaues Wunder erleben meaning "to experience an unpleasant surprise" (literally: "to experience a blue wonder"), reflecting the skeptical view of contemporary commentators. There is also a bridge in Wolgast known as Blaues Wunder.

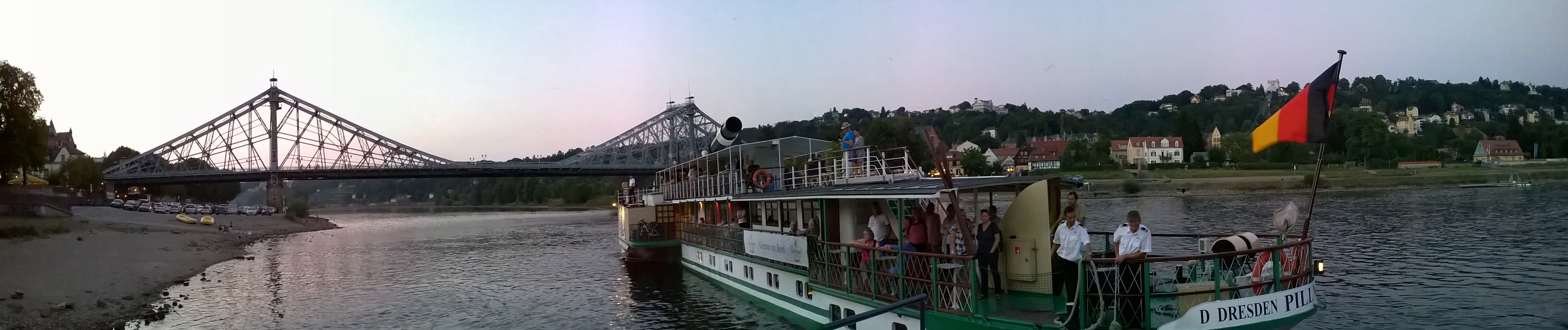
"Blaues Wunder" and ship "Pillnitz"

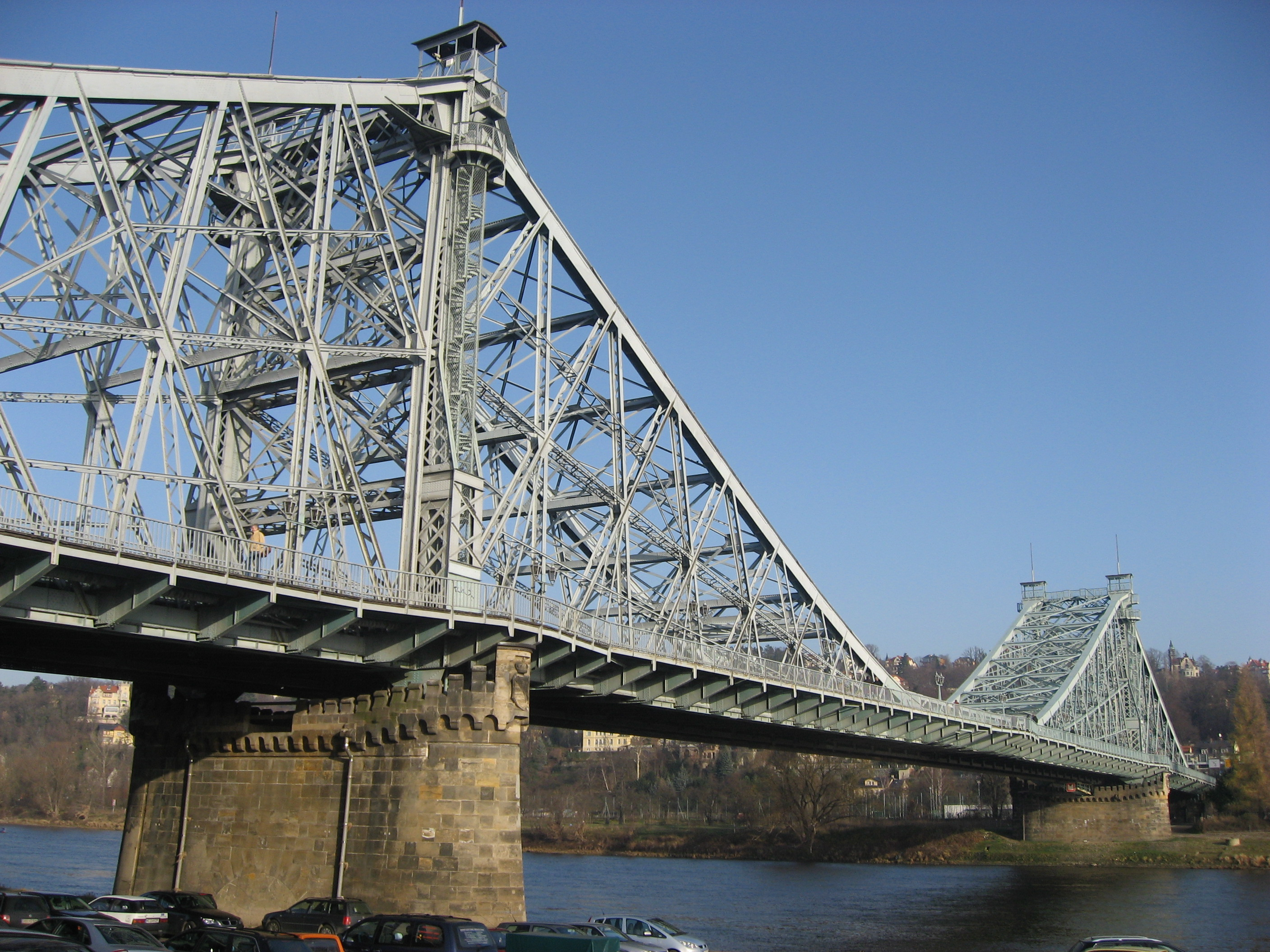
View from Blasewitz riverside

Construction took two years and was completed in 1893 at a cost of 2.25 million Goldmarks (equivalent to 16 million 2021 €) and named König-Albert-Brücke in honor of Albert, King of Saxony. In the 19th century, a bridge of this length without supporting river piers was considered a technological masterpiece. Today the technology is less miraculous, but the bridge is a much-loved symbol of the city.

The original bridge toll ended during the hyperinflation of 1923. Towards the end of World War II, an SS unit attempted to destroy the bridge, but this was prevented when two people cut the detonator wires. Preserved in its original construction, the advanced age of the structure in recent years has led to some traffic limits. Until the opening of the Waldschlösschen Bridge on 26 August 2013, it was the only Elbe crossing east of the city centre.

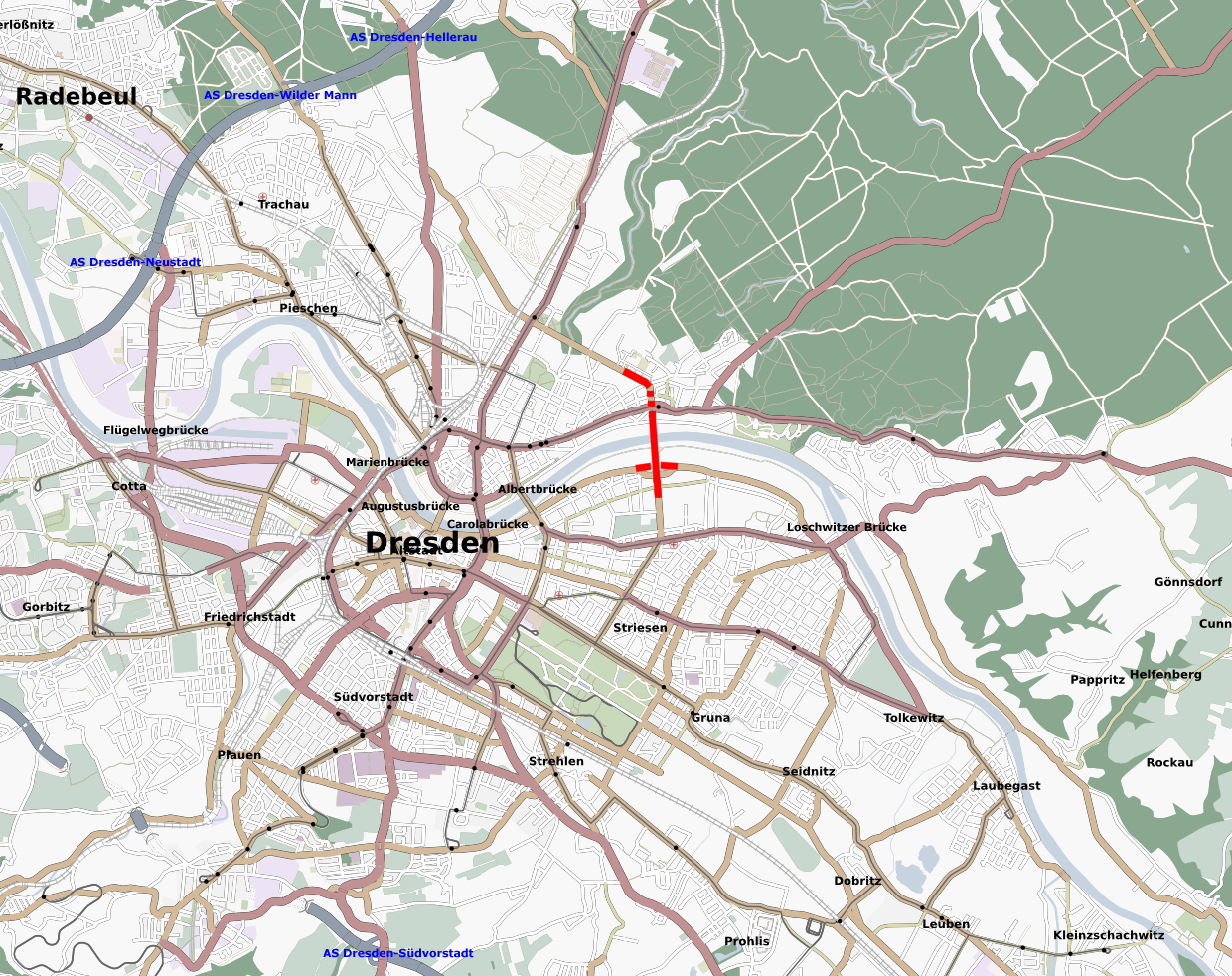
Blue Wonder (Loschwitzer Brücke) and Waldschlösschen Bridge (in red)

The surrounding area of 19.3 km^{2} (7.5 sq mi) of the Elbe meadows was declared a cultural World Heritage Site by the UNESCO in 2004, but lost the title in 2009 following the construction of the Waldschlösschen Bridge, meant to relieve congestion on the Blue Wonder.

== See also ==
- List of bridges in Germany
