= Dresden International School =

School in Dresden, Germany

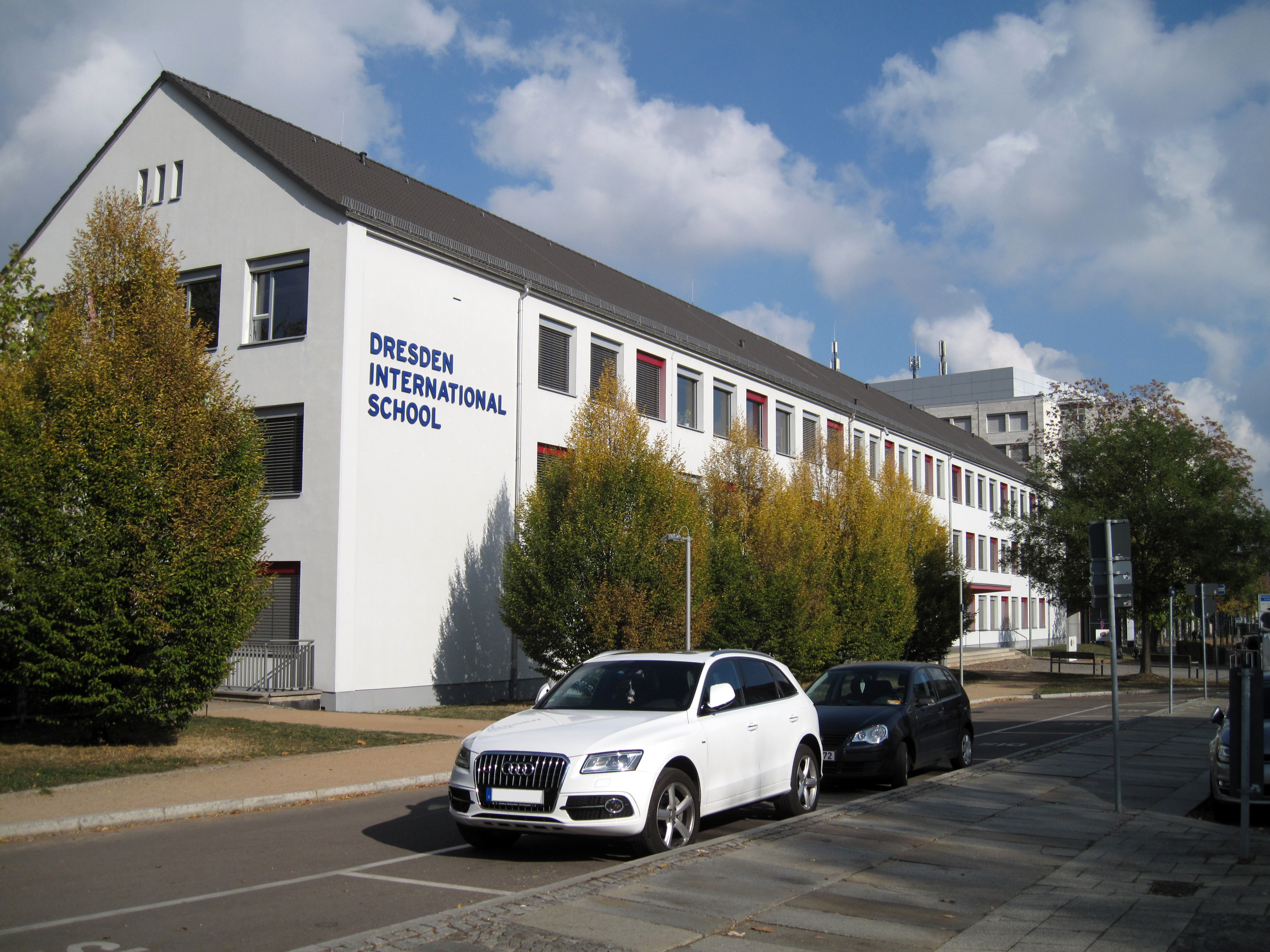
International School Dresden

Dresden International School (German: Internationale Schule Dresden e.V.) is an international school located in Dresden, Germany. It was founded in 1996 and offers preschool, primary school, and secondary school instruction. It is a member of the European Council of International Schools and has been an International Baccalaureate World School since June 2002. It offers the IB Primary and Middle Years programs as well as the IB Diploma Programme to 174 students. It also can award a US-style High school diploma, under accreditation by NEASC (New England Association of Schools and Colleges).

The school began with 13 pupils in 1996. In December 2010, it had 540.

== Programs ==
=== Middle Years Programme ===
Based on the study of eight subjects: Three languages, Mathematics, Art, Sciences, Humanities, Technology, and Physical Education. Three languages are studied over the course of the Middle Years Program: English, German, and Spanish.

=== Diploma Programme ===
A pre-university program for students ages 16 to 19 that lasts for two years. The DIS website states that the program is split into these 6 categories: Language acquisition, studies in language and literature, individuals and societies, mathematics, arts, and sciences. At the end of grade 12 students take external examinations that can allow them to graduate with an IB diploma.
