= Volker Klimpel =

German surgeon and historian of medicine

Volker Klimpel (born 27 December 1941) is a German surgeon and medical historian.

== Life ==
Born in Weimar, Klimpel studied medicine at the Leipzig University and the Medizinische Akademie Erfurt. He was admitted to the medical profession in Erfurt in 1967 and received his doctorate in 1969 with a dissertation under Eberhard Hasche. He received his surgical training under Gerhard Hasse in Eisenach and Werner Usbeck in Erfurt. After working in surgical clinics and polyclinics, he worked under Horst Rudolf Abe at the Department of History of Medicine at the Erfurt Medical Academy from 1984 to 1987. In 1990, he habilitated as an extern under Günter Heidel at the Medizinische Akademie "Carl Gustav Carus", part of TU Dresden, in the history of medicine. Heidel was the first holder of the Chair of History of Medicine at the Medical Academy "Carl Gustav Carus" Dresden from 1987. After the German reunification, Klimpel hired himself out from 1991 to 2005 as an expert assessor at the Medizinischer Dienst der Krankenversicherung Saxony. His fields of work are the history of surgery, literature and medicine, local and personal history and lexicography. Klimpel has been co-author of the biographical encyclopaedia on nursing history Who is who in nursing history (Horst-Peter Wolff with successor Hubert Kolling as editor) since 2008.

== Publications ==
- Dresdner Ärzte. Hellerau, Dresden 1998.
- Schriftsteller-Ärzte. Pressler, Hürtgenwald 1999.
- Frauen der Medizin. Pressler, Hürtgenwald 2001.
- Berühmte Dresdner. Hellerau, Dresden 2002.
- Politiker-Ärzte. Pressler, Hürtgenwald 2001. ISBN 978-3-87646-095-6.
- Ärzte-Tode. Königshausen & Neumann, Würzburg 2005.
- Lexikon fremdsprachiger Schriftsteller-Ärzte. Peter Lang, Frankfurt 2006.
- Das medizinische Dresden. Hellerau, Dresden 2009.
- Das heilkundige Sachsen. Hellerau, Dresden 2011.
- Asklepios trifft Kalliope. Medizinisch-literarische Begegnungen. WiKu, Cologne 2014.
- Dresdner Ärzte des 20. Jahrhunderts. Historisch-biographisches Lexikon. Hille Verlag, Dresden 2015. ISBN 978-3-939025-61-0.
- Chirurgie in Dresden – Streiflichter ihrer Geschichte. Kaden Verlag, Heidelberg 2017. ISBN 978-3-942825-47-4.
- Im Dunstkreis der Macht. Chirurgen um Hitler. Chirurgische Allgemeine, 18. Jahrgang, 6th issue (2017), pp. 315–319.
- Skalpell und Feder: Unbekannte und vergessene Schriftsteller-Ärzte. Weißensee, Berlin 2018. ISBN 978-3-89998-247-3.
- Zugeeignet. Medizinhistorische und andere Erinnerungen aus fünf Jahrzehnten. Kaden Verlag, Heidelberg 2018. ISBN 978-3-942825-68-9.
