= Dresden Suspension Railway =

Funicular suspension railway in Dresden, Germany

Coordinates: 51°03′15″N 13°49′05″E

Dresden Suspension Railway (Schwebebahn Dresden)
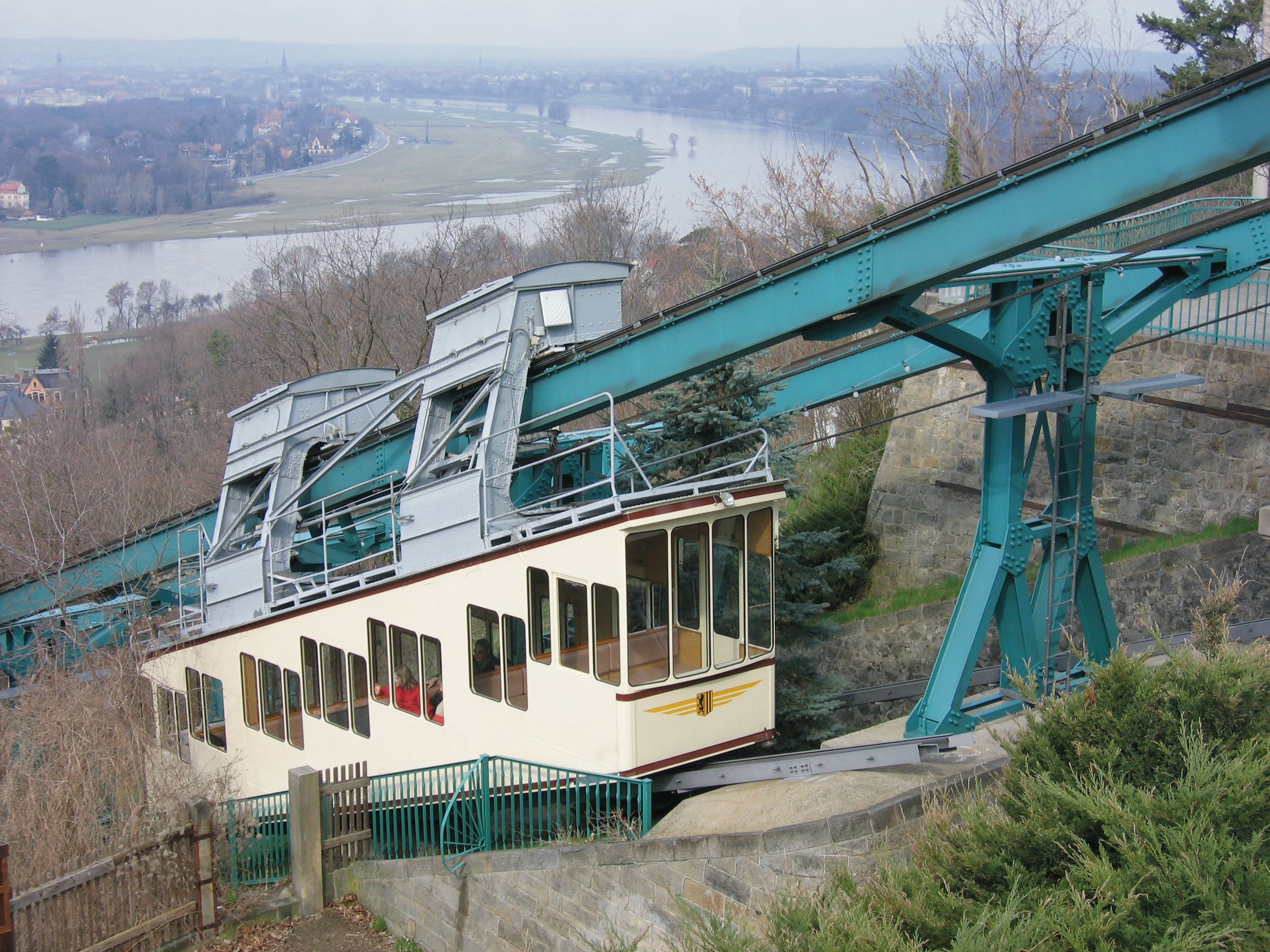

Overview
- Locale: Dresden, Germany
- Transit type: Suspended funicular
- Number of lines: 1
- Website: dvb.de

Operation
- Began operation: 31 May 1901; 125 years ago

Technical
- System length: 274 metres

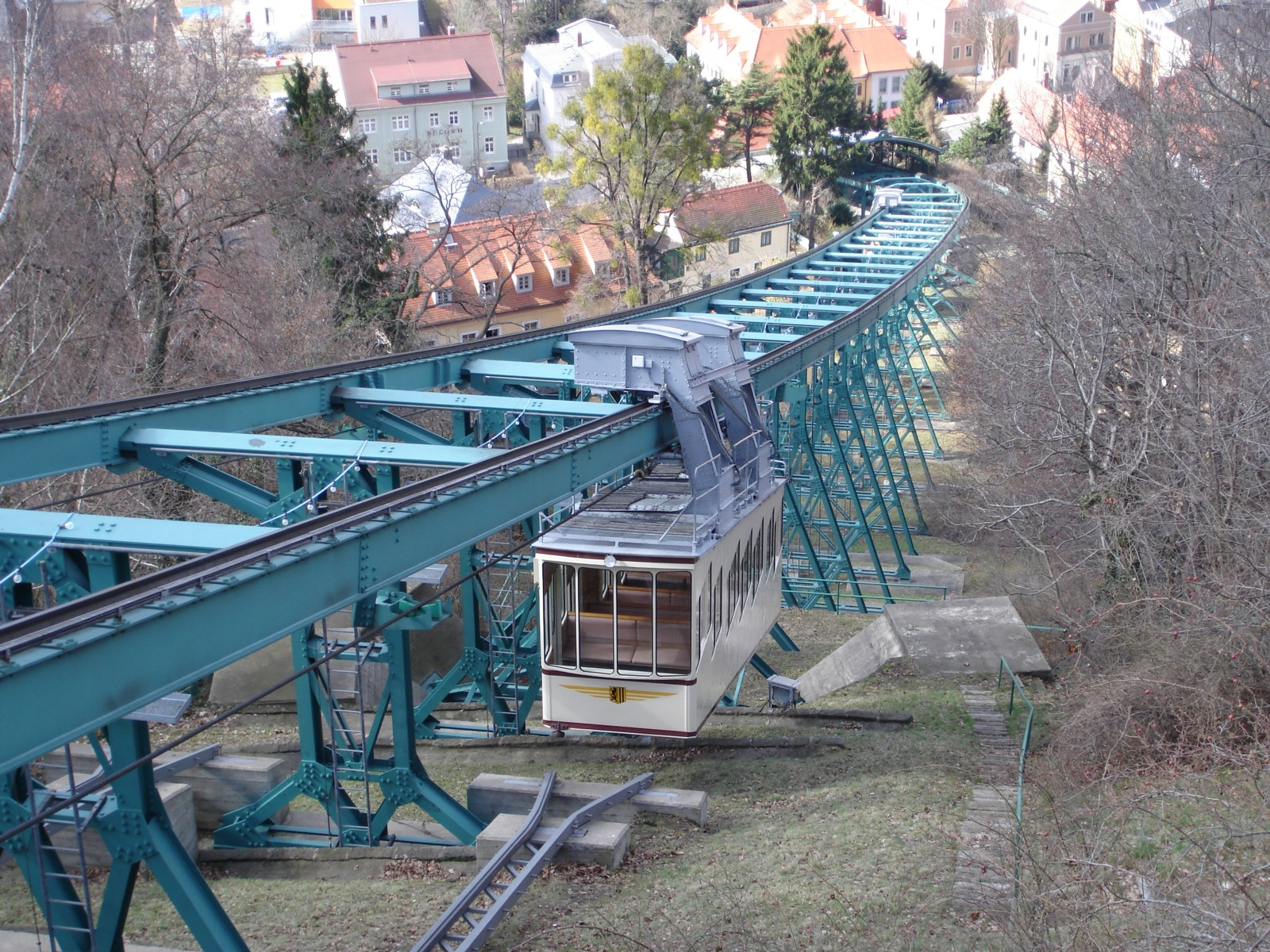
Schwebebahn Dresden

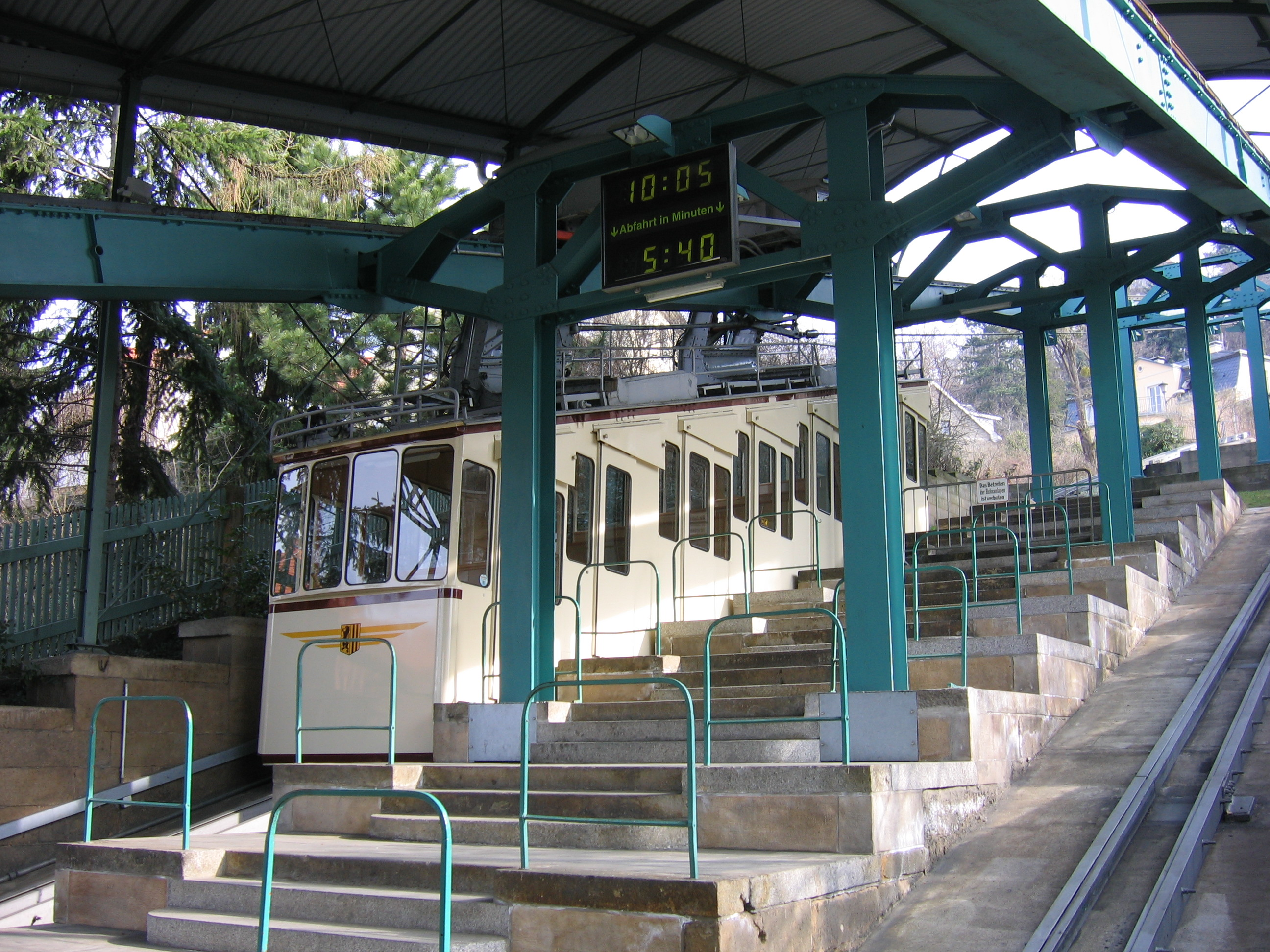
Schwebebahn car in station

The Dresden Suspension Railway (German: Schwebebahn Dresden) is a suspended funicular located in Dresden, Germany, and connects the districts of Loschwitz and Oberloschwitz (Rochwitz side). It is one of the oldest suspension railways, having entered service on 6 May 1901, the same year the Wuppertal Schwebebahn entered service. Like the Wuppertal railway, the system was designed by Eugen Langen. The line is 274 metres (899 ft) long and is supported on 33 pillars.

== Overview ==
Despite its unusual suspended format, the Dresden Suspension Railway is operated as a conventional funicular railway. The two cars are attached to each other by a cable, which runs around a drum at the top of the incline. The ascending car is pulled up the hill by the weight of the descending car, assisted if necessary by an electric drive to the drum.

The line has the following technical parameters:

- Length: 274 metres (899 ft)
- Height: 84 metres (276 ft)
- Maximum Steepness: 39.2%
- Cars: 2
- Capacity: 40 passengers per car
- Configuration: Double suspension track (Monorail)
- Maximum speed: 2.5 metres per second (8.2 ft/s)
- Traction: Electricity

The Schwebebahn was not damaged in World War II, but it was out of service from 1984 to 1992 due to reconstruction. In 1990 and 2002, extensive repair works took place and there is now a new lookout point on the roof of the upper station.

The Schwebebahn is one of two funicular railways in Dresden, the other being the much more conventional Dresden Cable Car. Both lines are operated by the Dresdner Verkehrsbetriebe AG, who also operate the city's tram, bus and ferry networks.

== See also ==
- List of funicular railways
- Dresden Funicular Railway since 1895
