= Theaterplatz (Dresden) =

Square in Dresden, Germany

Coordinates: 51°03′14″N 13°44′10″E

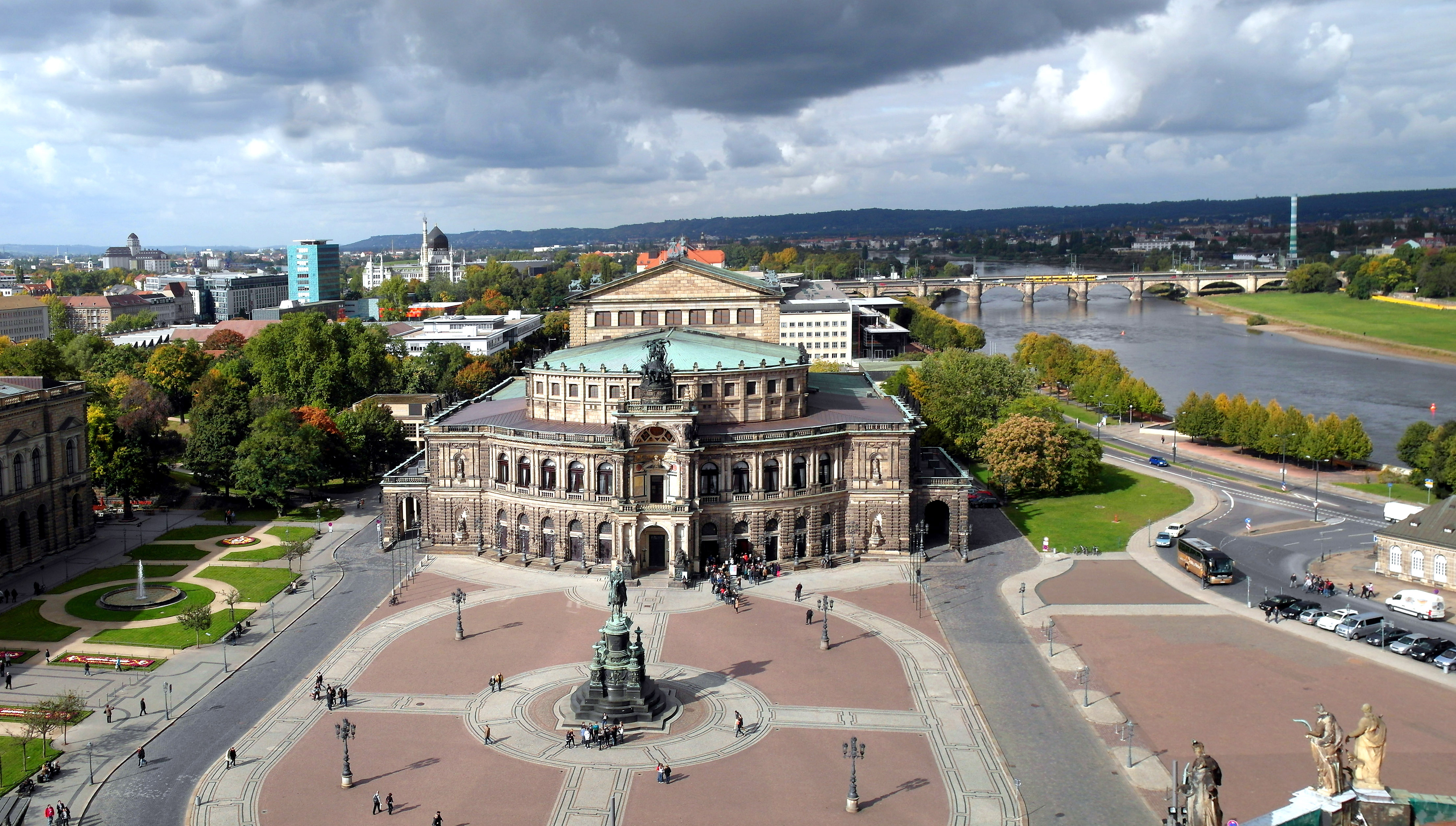
The plaza.

The Theaterplatz (English: Theatre Square) in Dresden is a historic square in the city. It is located in the west of the inner old town.

== Location ==
The Theaterplatz is the place in front of the Dresden Semperoper, the former court theater; its name is also derived from this. It is located on Sophie Street between Postplatz and the Augustus Bridge. It borders directly on the slope of the Elbe arch in front of Dresden's old town and is thus elevated above the Elbe. Via the driveway to the Augustusbrücke, a broad view over the Elbe and into the Dresdner Heath is possible from Theaterplatz.

Major tourist destinations in the Old Town such as Green Vault, Neumarkt with the Church of Our Lady, Semper Opera House are located in the immediate vicinity or within walking distance.

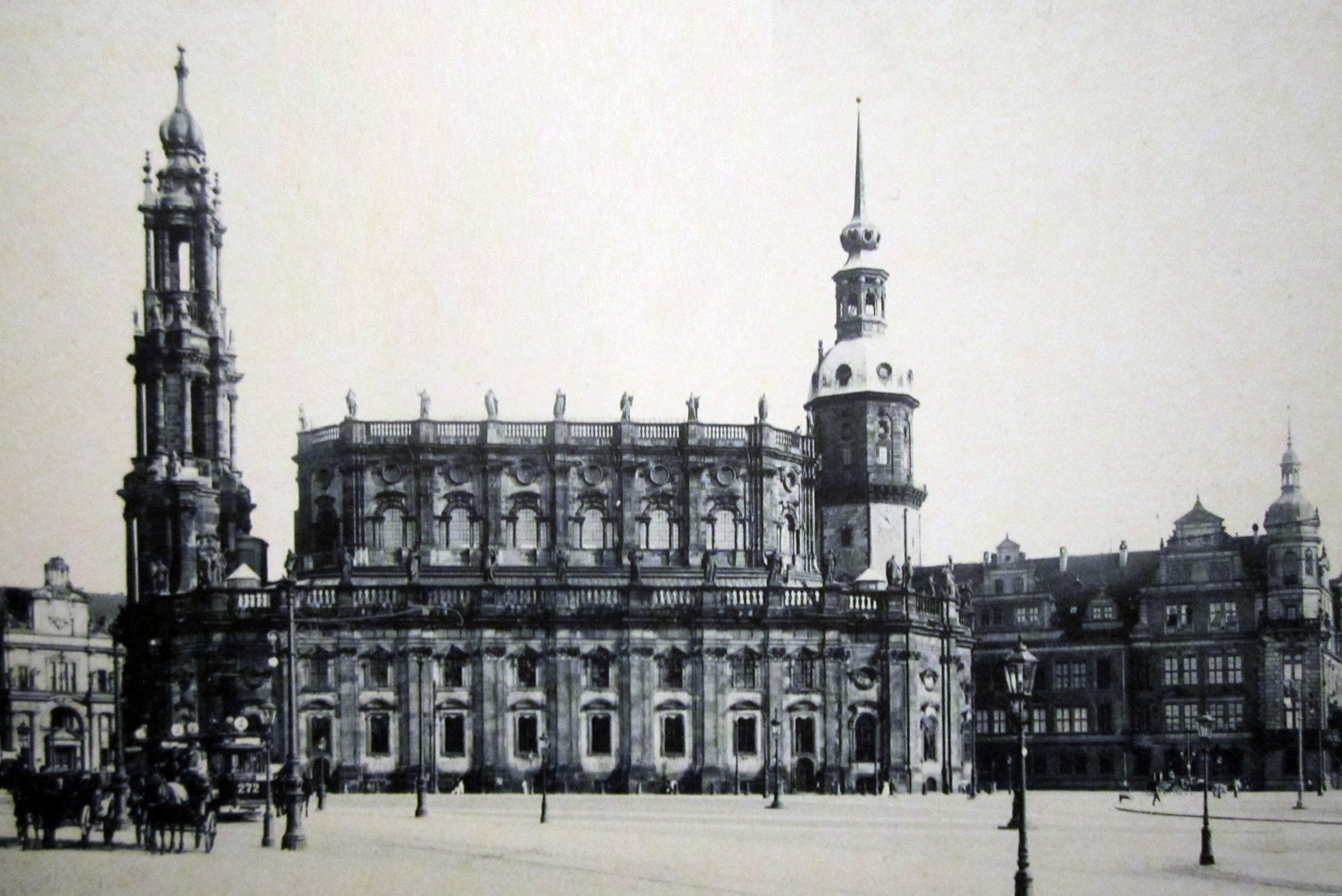
Theaterplatz Dresden (1905)

== Buildings ==
In contrast to the Old Market or Neumarkt, the Theaterplatz is not within the historic center, but west of the edge. Civil development is therefore very little at the theater square. Starting in the north, the Italian village separates the Theaterplatz from the Elbe. The building is one of the youngest in the square and was built by Hans Erlwein. The more famous Erlweinspeicher, a technical structure, can also be seen from the Theaterplatz. In the southeast the Sophienstraße with the driveway to the Augustus Bridge separates the Italian village of the Dresden Cathedral. It is the only completely baroque building on the square. A small alley separates the church from Dresden Castle which has been widely expanded and redesigned.

Also by the Sophienstraße Dresden Castle and Altstädtische Hauptwache as well as the Zwinger are separated. The Altstädter Wache was designed by Karl Friedrich Schinkel and can therefore be assigned to the Schinkel school. In the south-southwest the Semper Gallery, which has a façade in the style of the Neoreneaissance, borders.

In the northwest then closes the most famous work of Gottfried Semper: The Semperoper - which is now the third building in this place.

== See also ==
- Town square
