= Gemäldegalerie Alte Meister =

Art gallery in Dresden, Germany

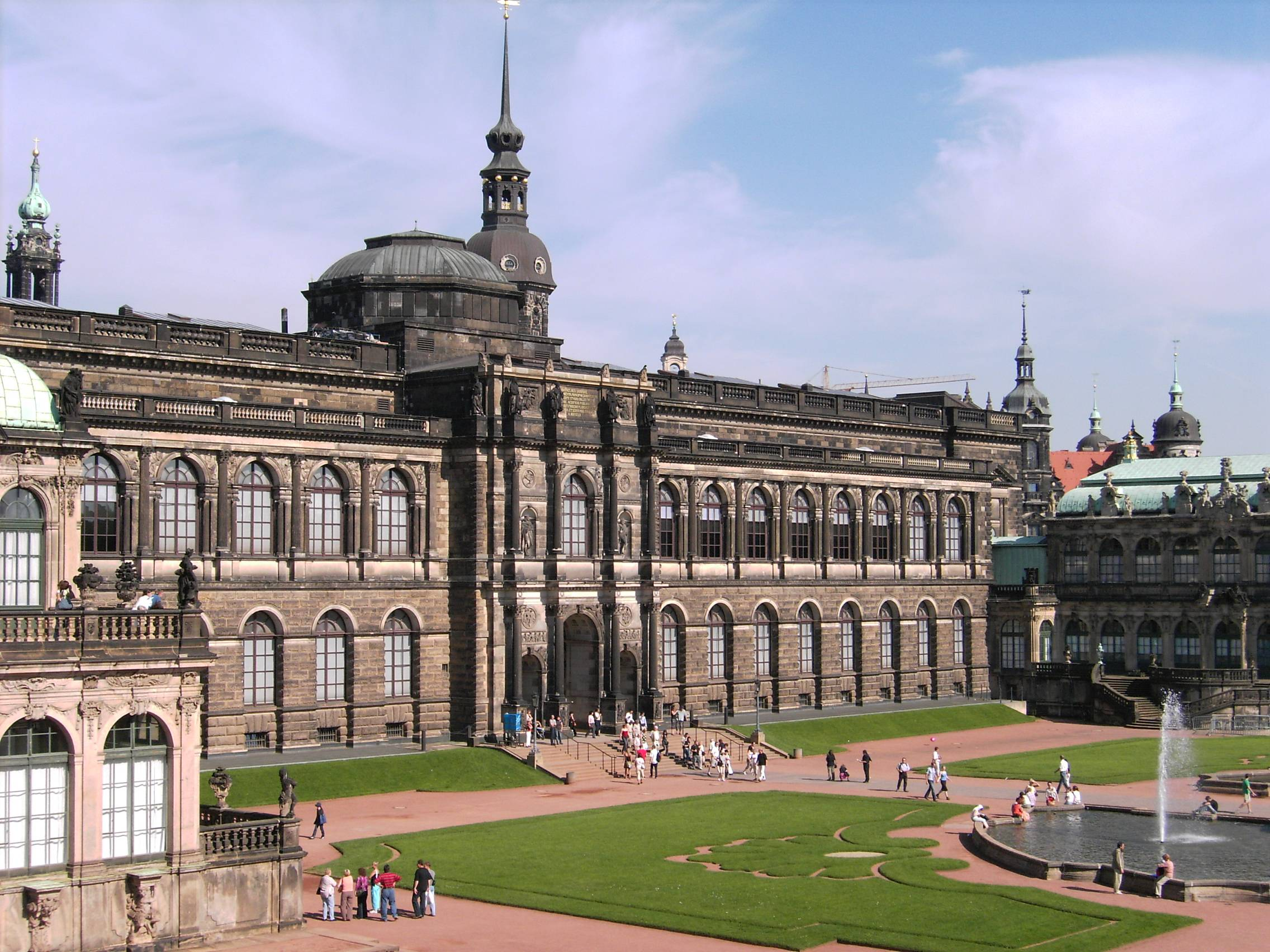
- Semper Gallery that houses the Gemäldegalerie seen from the Zwinger courtyard
- Interactive fullscreen map
- Location: Dresden, Germany
- Coordinates: 51°03′12″N 13°44′05″E

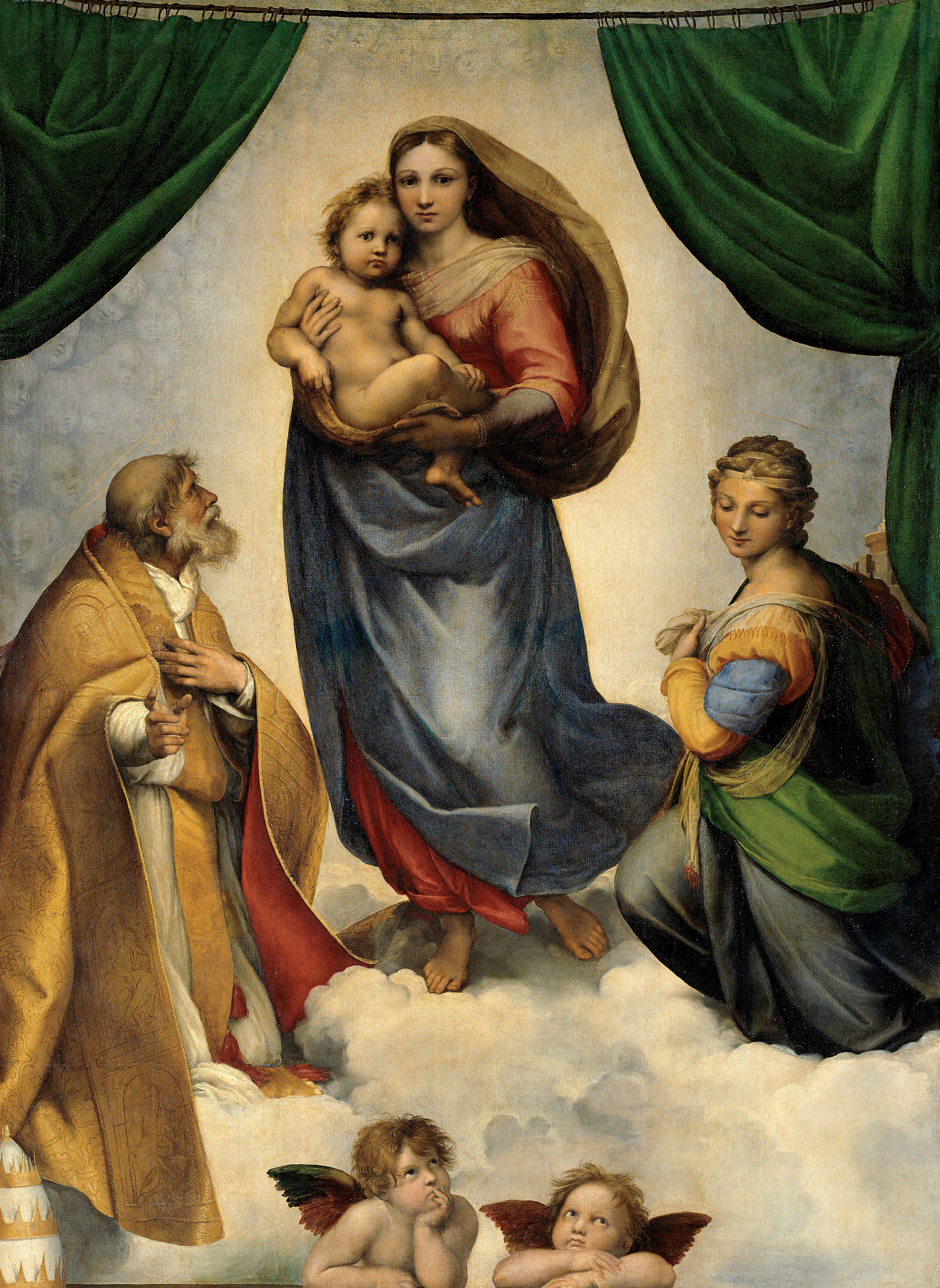
Sistine Madonna by Raphael

The Gemäldegalerie Alte Meister (German pronunciation: [ɡəˈmɛːldəɡaləˌʁiː ˈʔaltə ˈmaɪstɐ], Old Masters Gallery) in Dresden, Germany, displays around 750 paintings from the 15th to the 18th centuries. It includes major Italian Renaissance works as well as Dutch and Flemish paintings. Outstanding works by German, French, and Spanish painters of the period are also among the gallery's attractions.

The Old Masters are part of the Dresden State Art Collections. The collection is located in the Semper Gallery, the gallery wing of the Zwinger.

== History ==
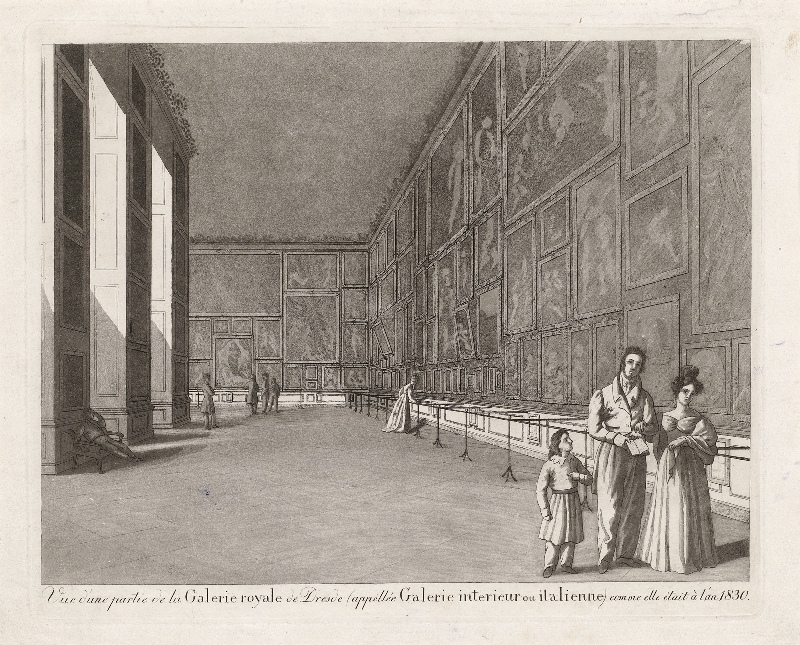
Interior view of the Royal Painting Collection around 1830

When the Kunstkammer (Art Chamber) of the Electors of Saxony in Dresden was founded by Augustus, Elector of Saxony in 1560, paintings were subordinate to collectors' pieces from science, other art works and curiosities. It was not until the beginning of the 18th century that Augustus II the Strong and his son Frederick Augustus II started to collect paintings systematically. Over a period of less than 60 years, these two art-loving Electors of Saxony, who were also Kings of Poland, expanded the collections significantly. In 1745, the 100 best pieces of the collection belonging to the Duke of Modena (Francesco III) were purchased, arriving in Dresden the following year.

As the fast-growing painting collection soon required more space for storage and presentation, it was moved from Dresden Castle to the adjacent Stallgebäude (the Electors' Stables Building) in 1747.

In the meantime the collection had achieved European fame. Paintings from all over Europe, especially from Italy, Paris, Amsterdam and Prague, were acquired and sent to Dresden. The purchasing activities of the Electors were crowned by the acquisition of Raphael's Sistine Madonna in 1754. The Dresden painting gallery became not only one of the most famous Old Masters collections in Northern European, but also a prototype of the modern museums that would emerge in the late 18th century.

In 1838, the architect Gottfried Semper was invited by a gallery commission working for King Frederick Augustus II, to design an appropriate architectural setting for the collection. The new gallery wing of the Zwinger was consequently built from 1847 to 1854. On 25 September 1855, the Neues Königliches Museum (New Royal Museum) opened in the Semper Gallery where it is still located today.

Due to shortage of space in 1931, the Modern Department of the museum with paintings from the 19th and 20th centuries moved into a separate building on Brühl's Terrace, laying the foundations for what is now known as the New Masters Gallery.

When World War II was imminent in 1938, the museum was closed. The artworks were mostly safely stored away when the gallery building itself was severely damaged in the bombing of Dresden on 13 February 1945. At the end of the war in 1945, most of the paintings were confiscated by the Red Army and transported to Moscow and Kiev. On their return to Dresden in 1955, part of the collection was displayed on the ground floor of the still partly destroyed Semper Gallery. The Old Masters Gallery re-opened in 1960 after the reconstruction of the gallery building was completed. While the most important paintings survived this period, the losses were significant. Records from 1963 state that 206 paintings had been destroyed and 507 were missing. Of these, some 450 are still missing today.

== Collection ==
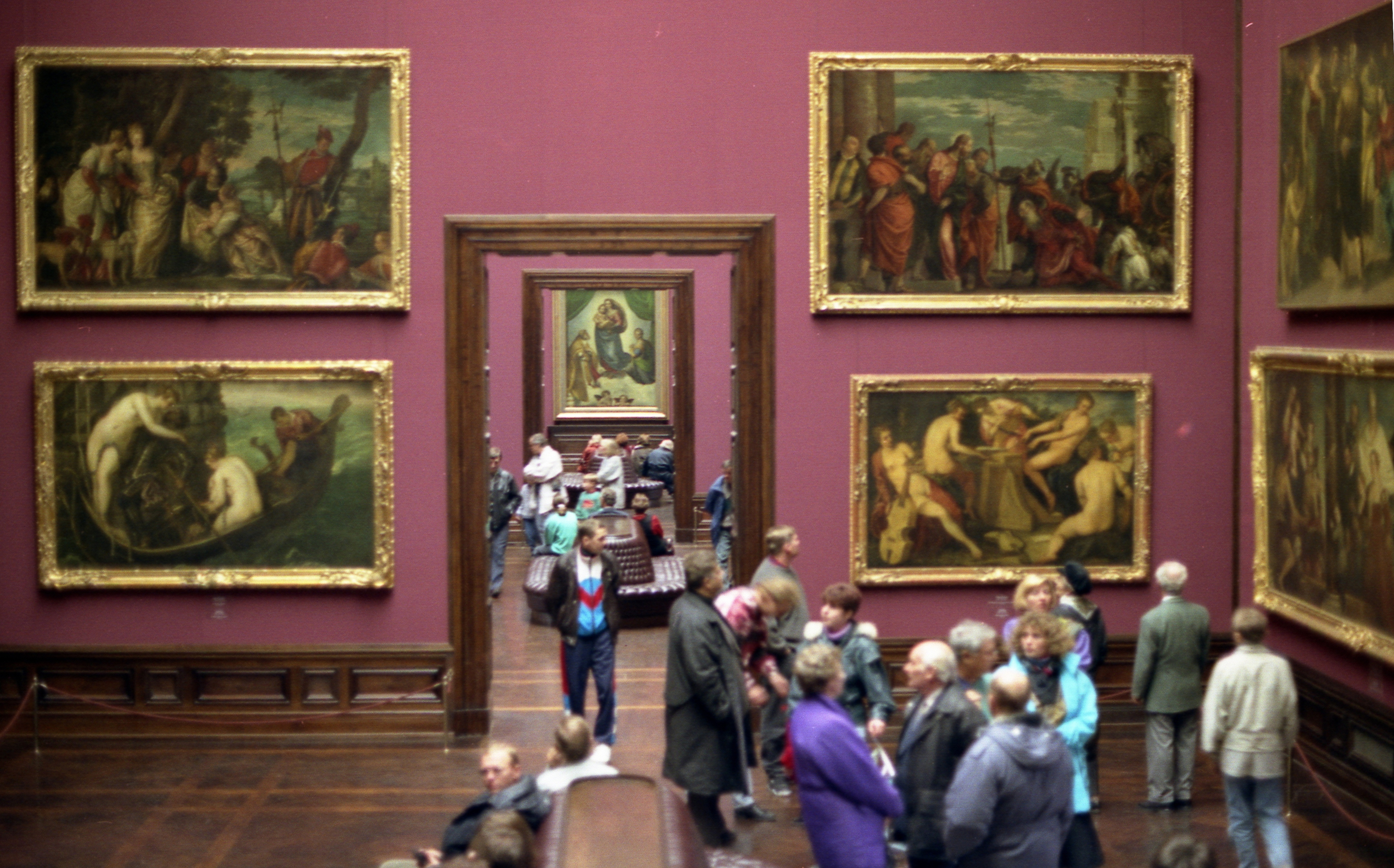
Inside the gallery with the Sistine Madonna in the background

Some 750 paintings, or 40 percent of the entire collection, are exhibited in the gallery. They date from the 15th to the 18th centuries. Paintings from the 19th century onwards are displayed in the New Masters Gallery (Gemäldegalerie Neue Meister) in the Albertinum.

Renaissance and Baroque masterpieces by Italian painters such as Raphael, Titian, Giorgione, Correggio, Tintoretto and Guercino are displayed. The collection contains a large number of 17th-century Flemish and Dutch paintings by Rubens, Rembrandt, Jordaens, Van Dyck and Vermeer. Outstanding works by German, French and Spanish painters are also among the gallery's attractions.

With 58 paintings by Lucas Cranach the Elder and Lucas Cranach the Younger, the gallery houses the world's largest collection of Cranach paintings. Panels and canvases of the early Renaissance are also exhibited, including the recently restored Saint Sebastian by Antonello da Messina.

The color of the walls is used to structure the collection. Italian artwork is exhibited in rooms with deep red walls. Dutch and Flemish paintings are shown on green backgrounds. Spanish and French pictures from the 17th century are displayed on blue walls.

The Gemäldegalerie Alte Meister receives more than 500,000 visitors a year.

=== Highlights ===
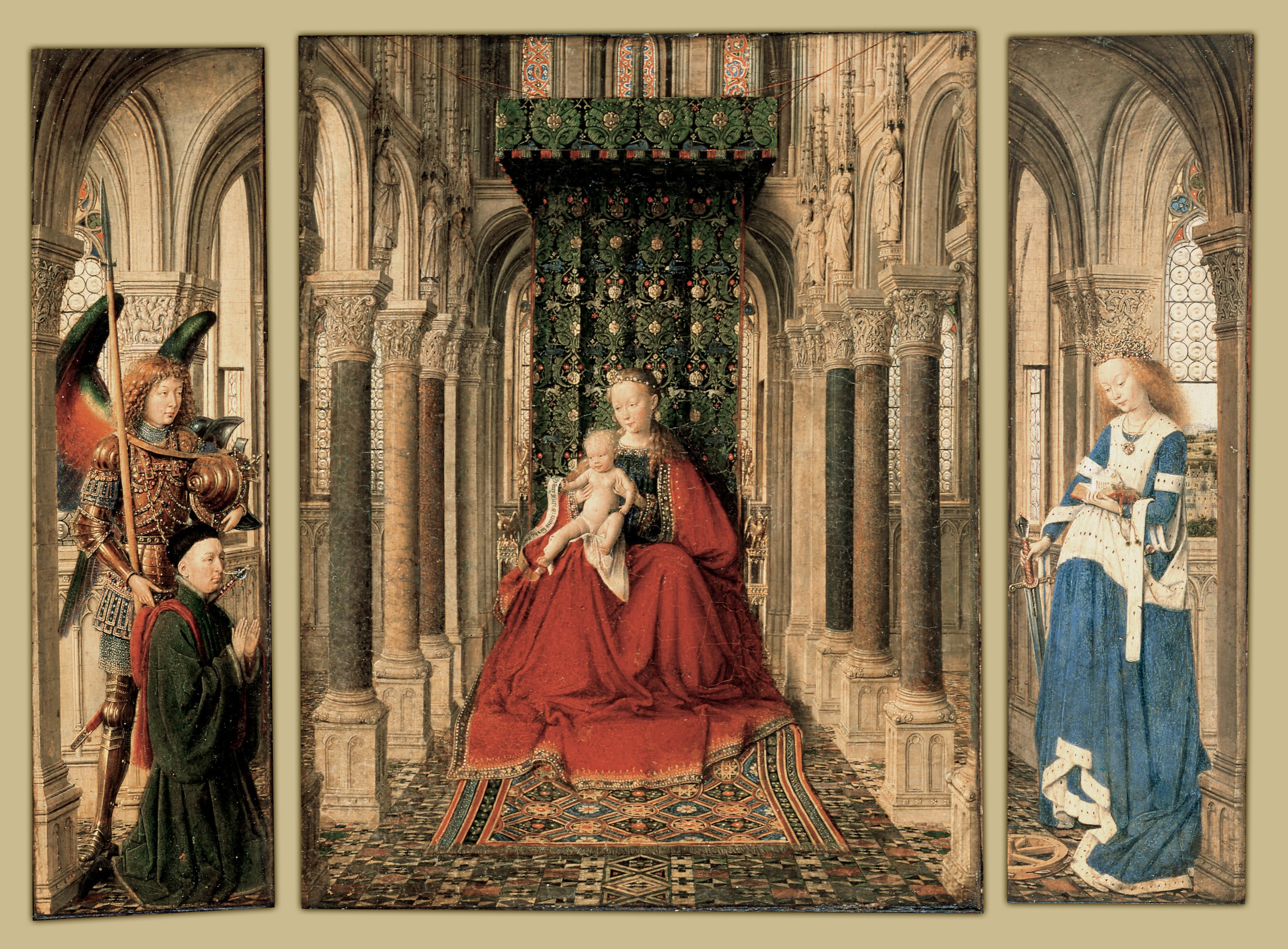
Jan van Eyck: Dresden Triptych, c. 1437

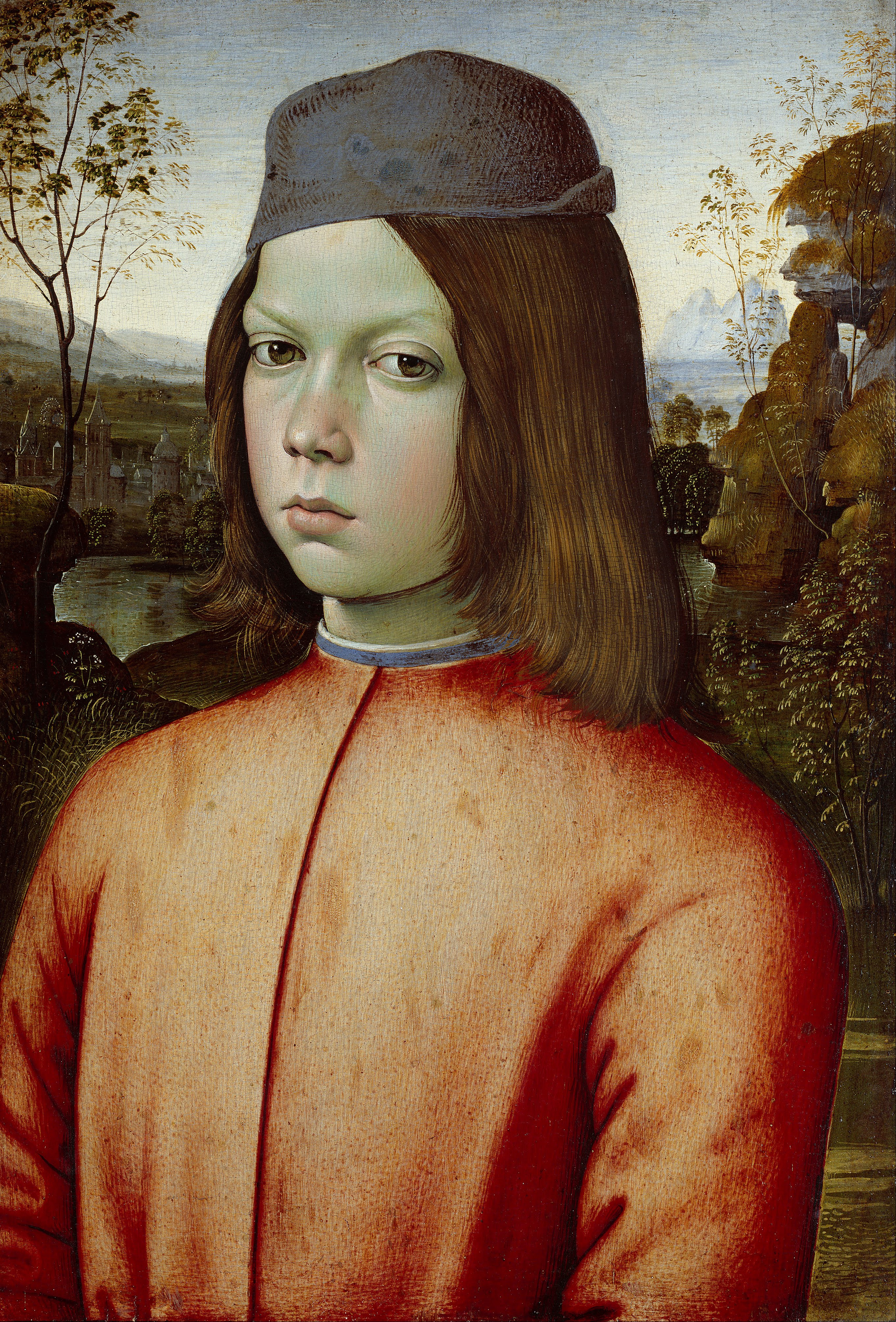
Pinturicchio: Portrait of a Boy, c. 1500

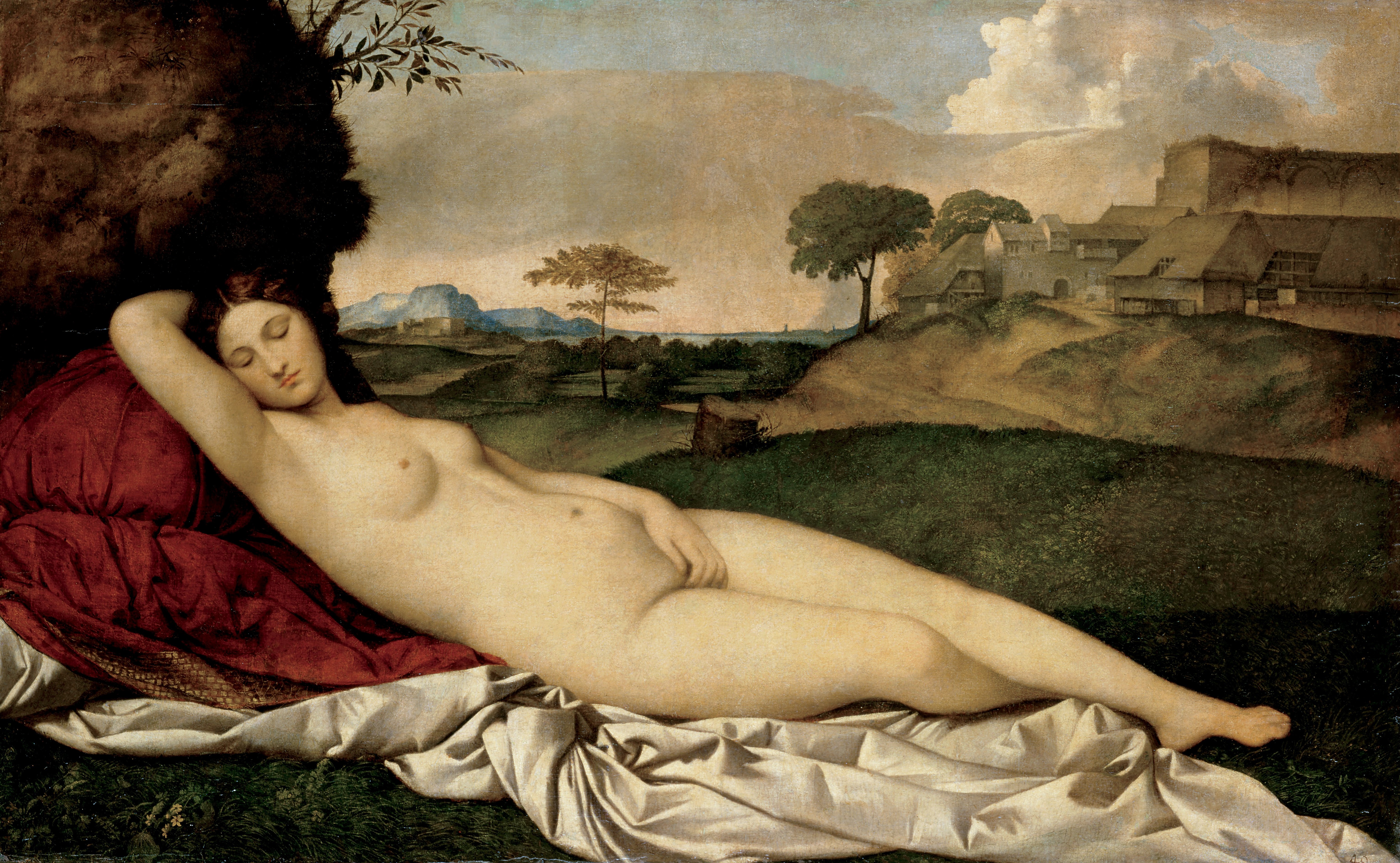
Giorgione: Sleeping Venus, 1508/10

Titian: The Tribute Money, c. 1516

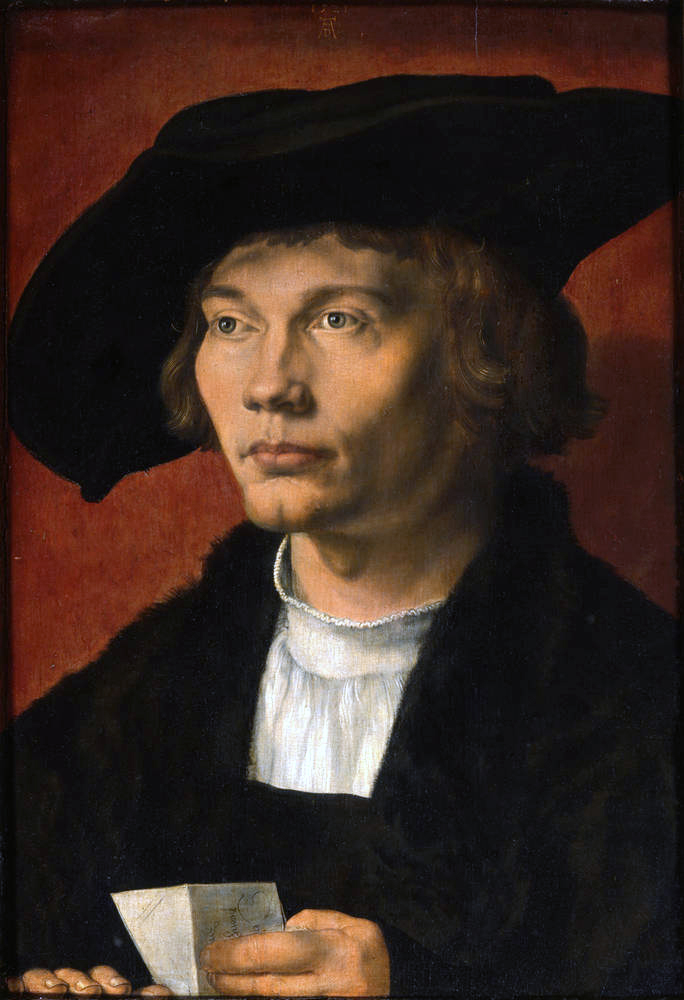
Albrecht Dürer: Bernard von Reesen, 1521

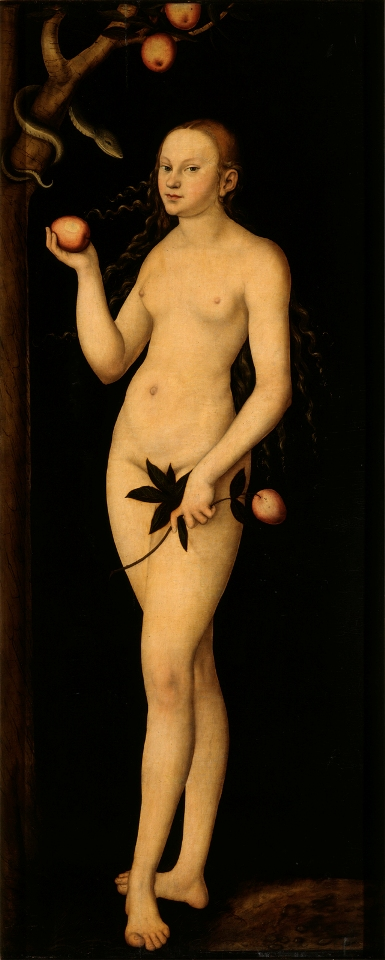
Lucas Cranach the Elder: Eve, 1531

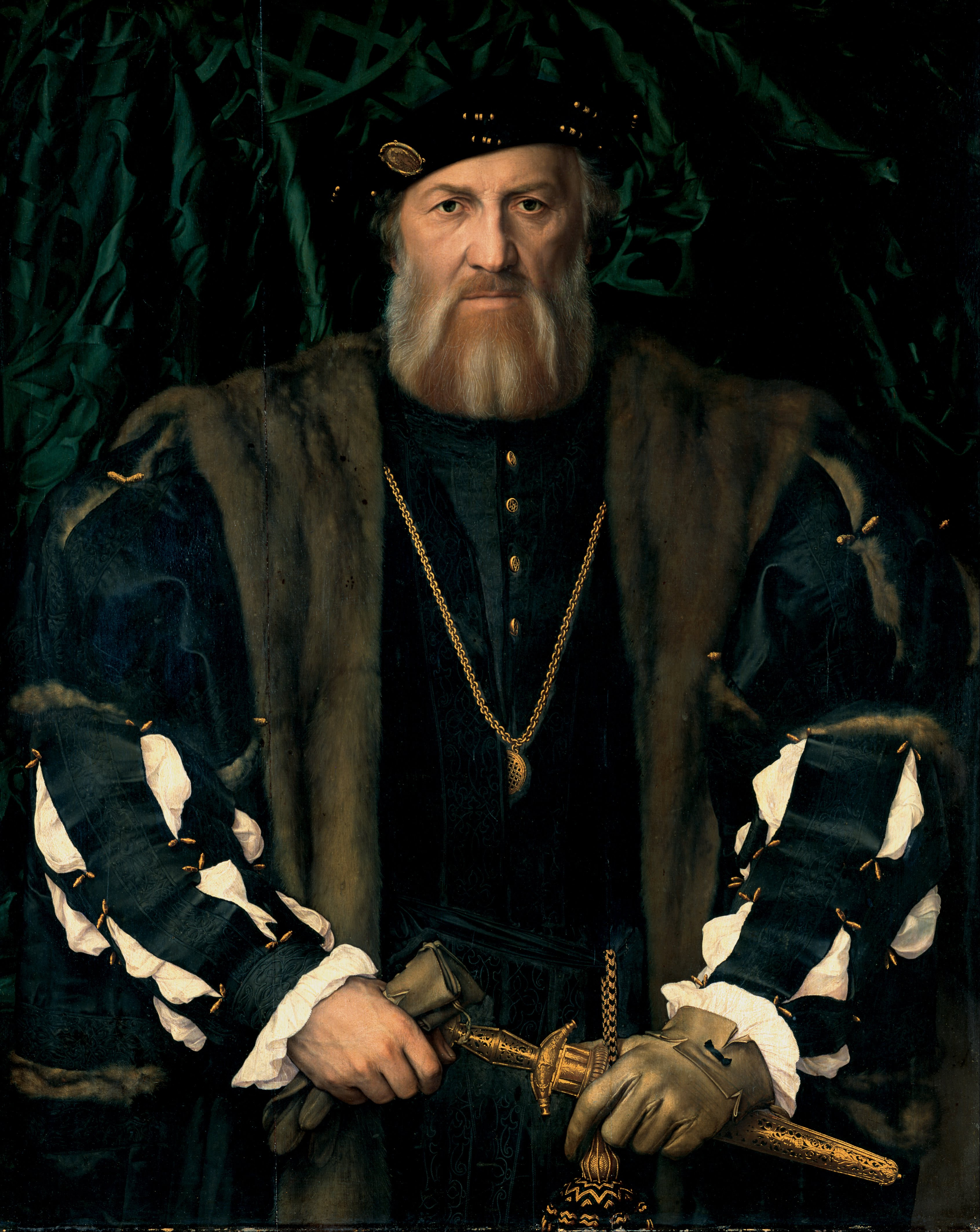
Hans Holbein the Younger: Charles de Solier, comte de Morette, (1480/81–1564), 1534/35

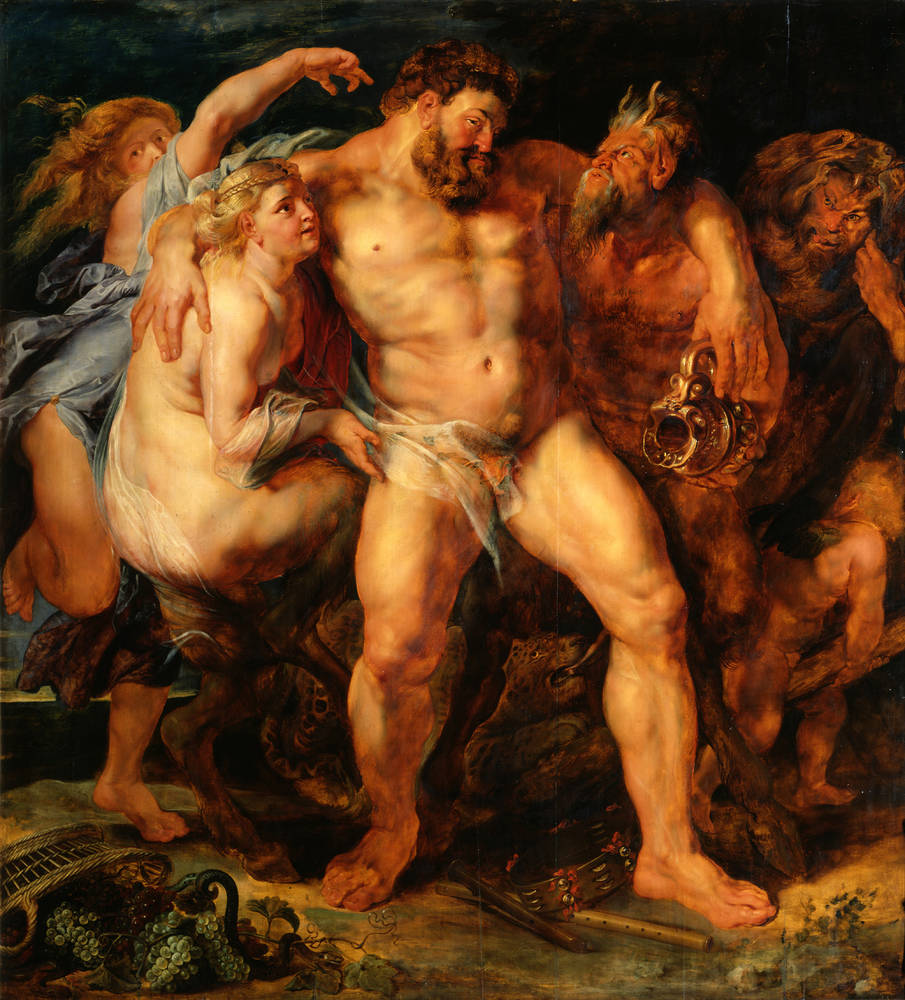
Peter Paul Rubens: Hercules Drunk, Being Led Away By a Nymph and a Satyr, c. 1613/14

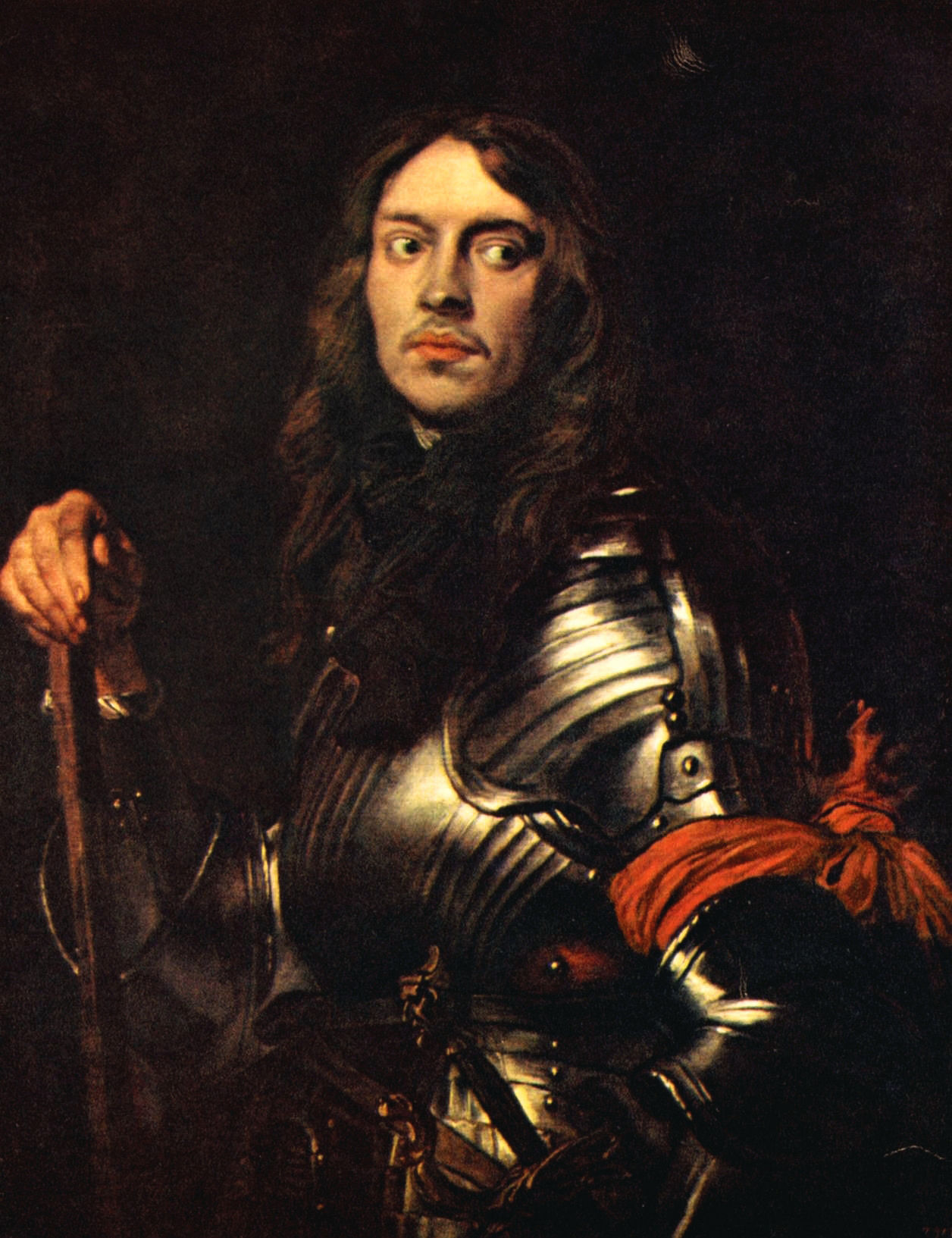
Anthony van Dyck: Portrait of a Commander in Armour, with a Red Scarf, c. 1625/27

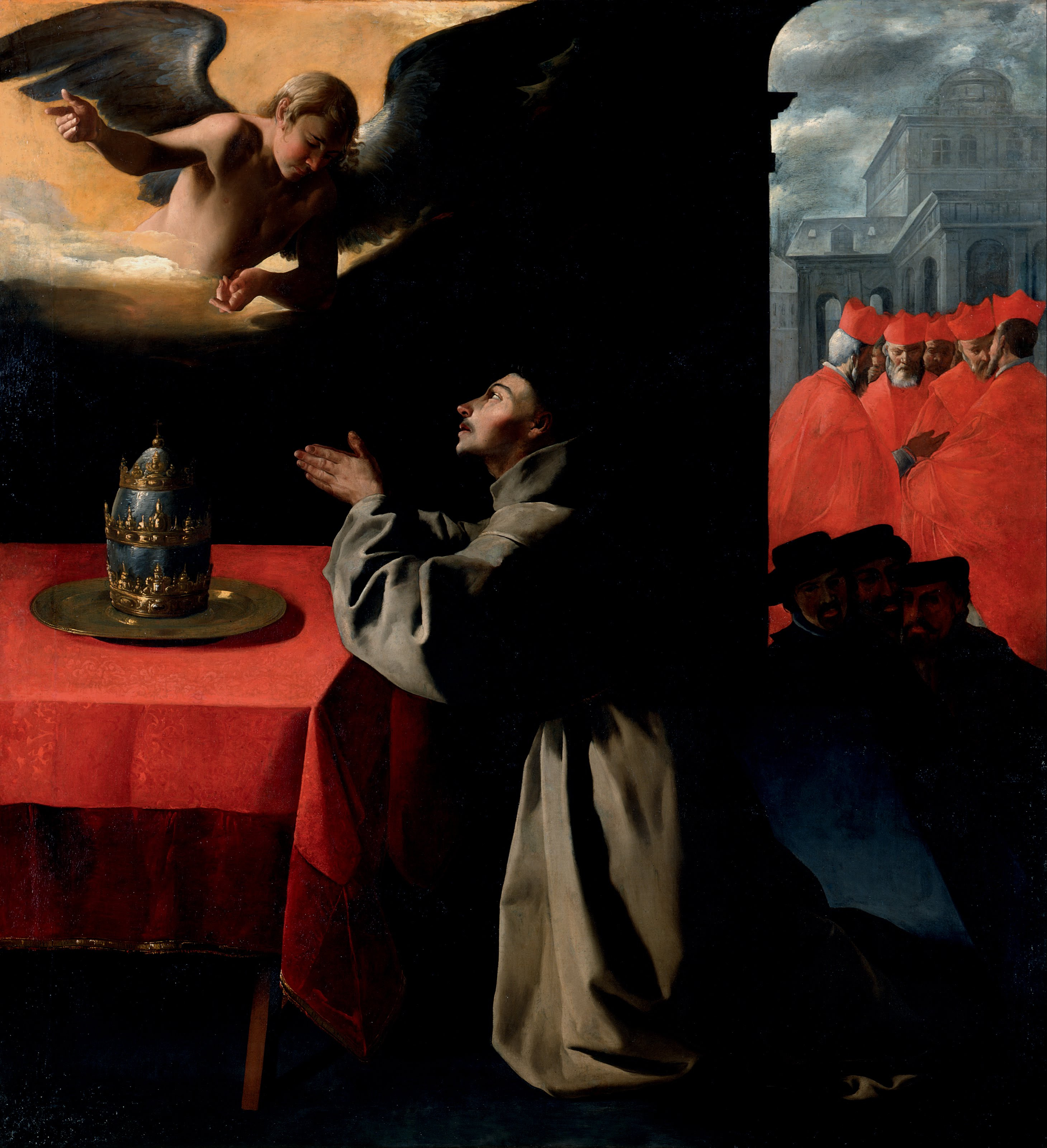
Francisco de Zurbarán: Saint Bonaventure at Prayer, 1628/29

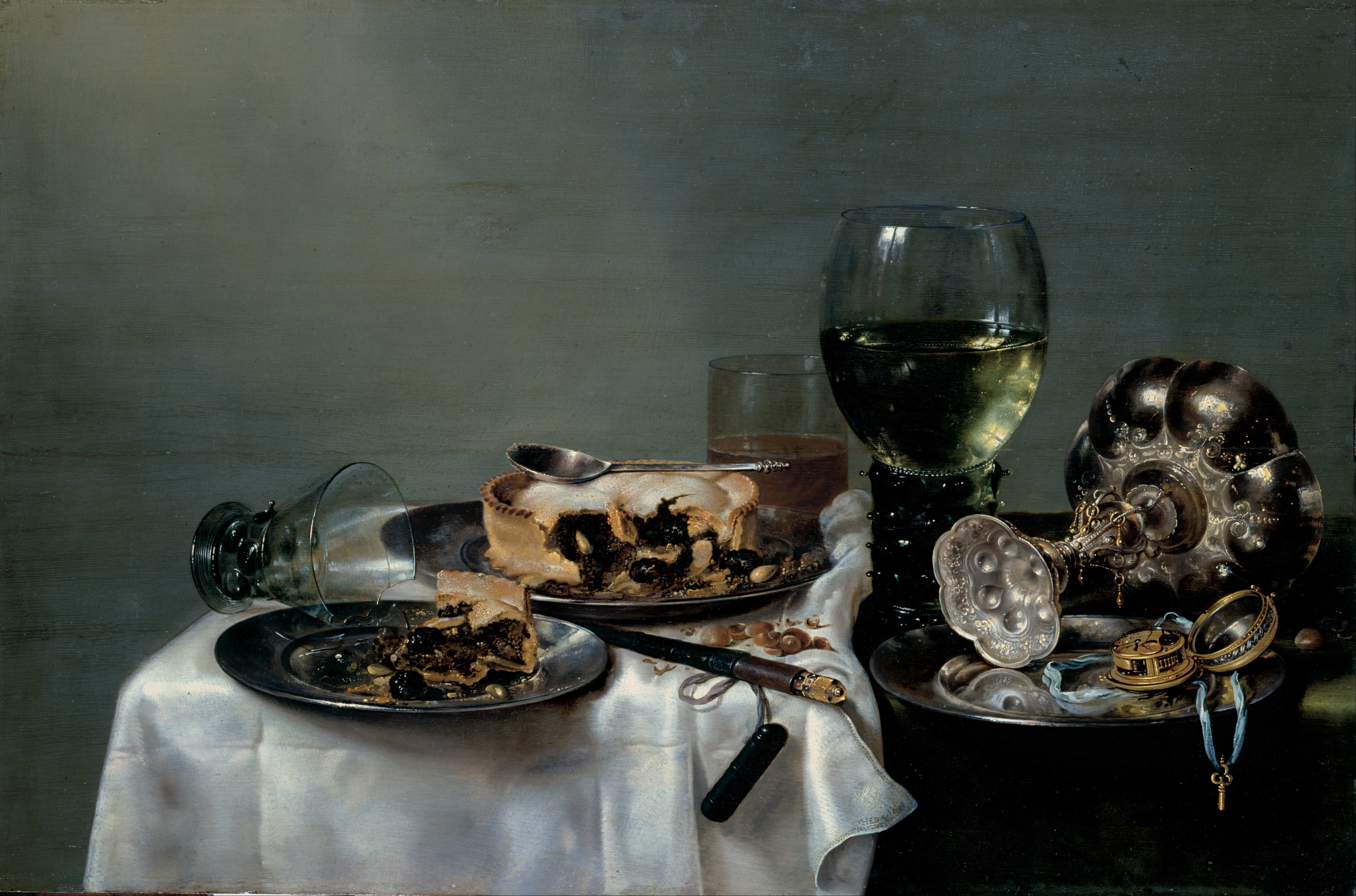
Willem Claeszoon Heda: Breakfast Table with Blackberry Pie, 1631

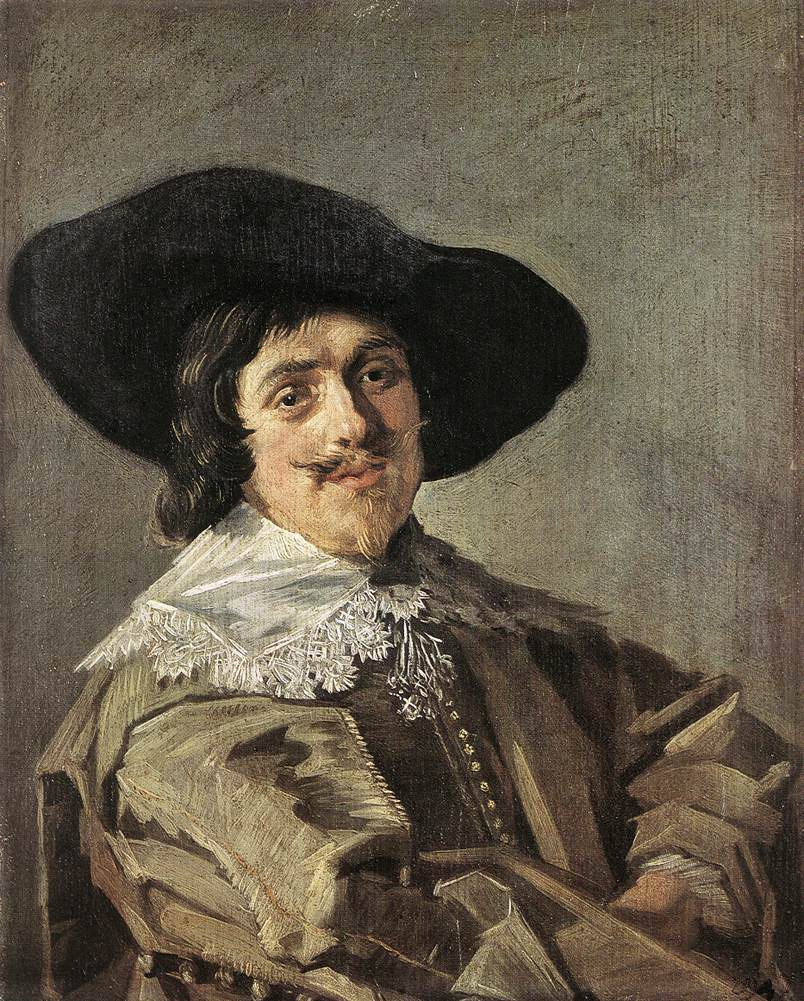
Frans Hals: Portrait of a Man in a Yellowish-Gray Jacket, 1633

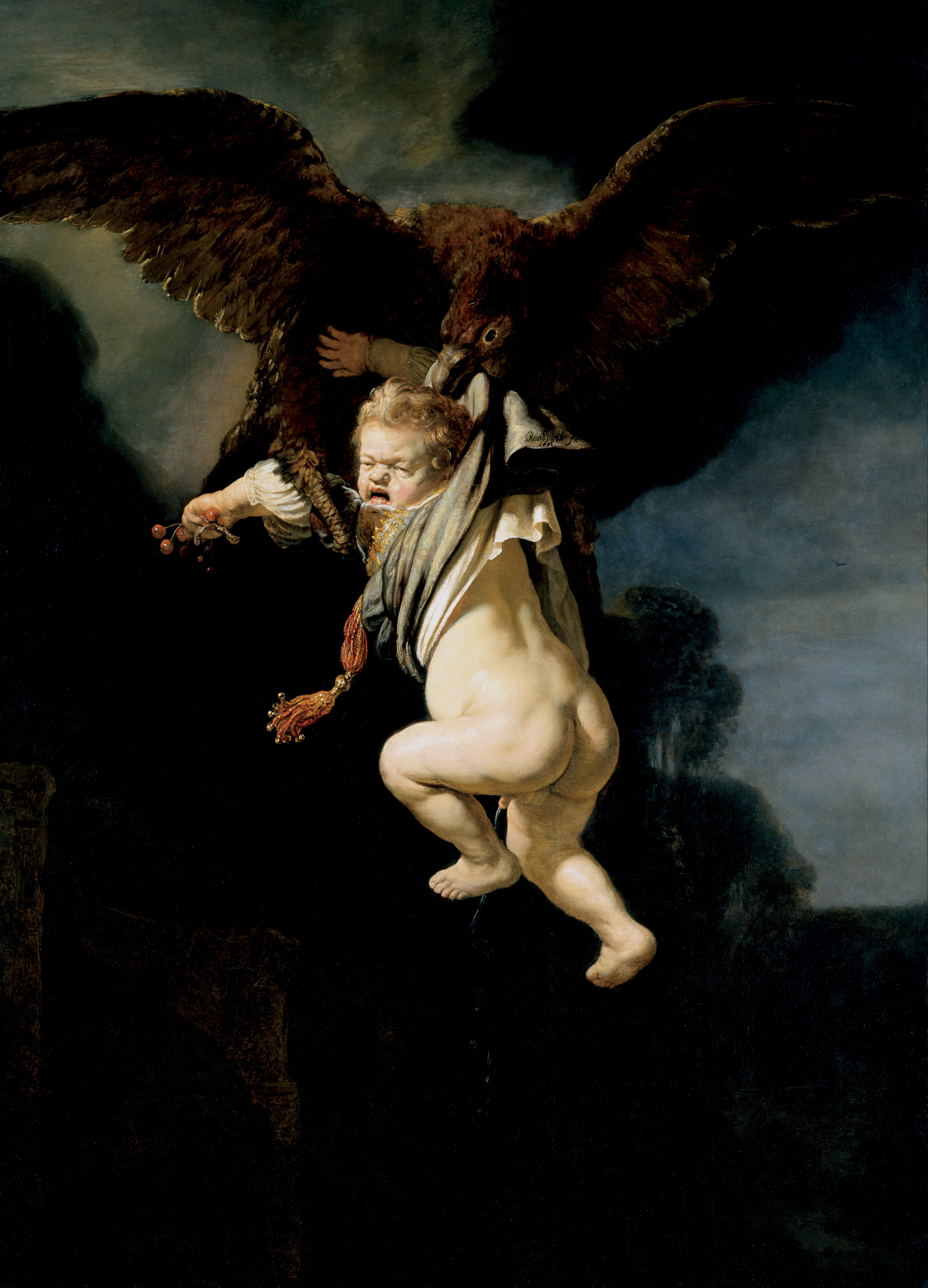
Rembrandt: The Rape of Ganymede, 1635

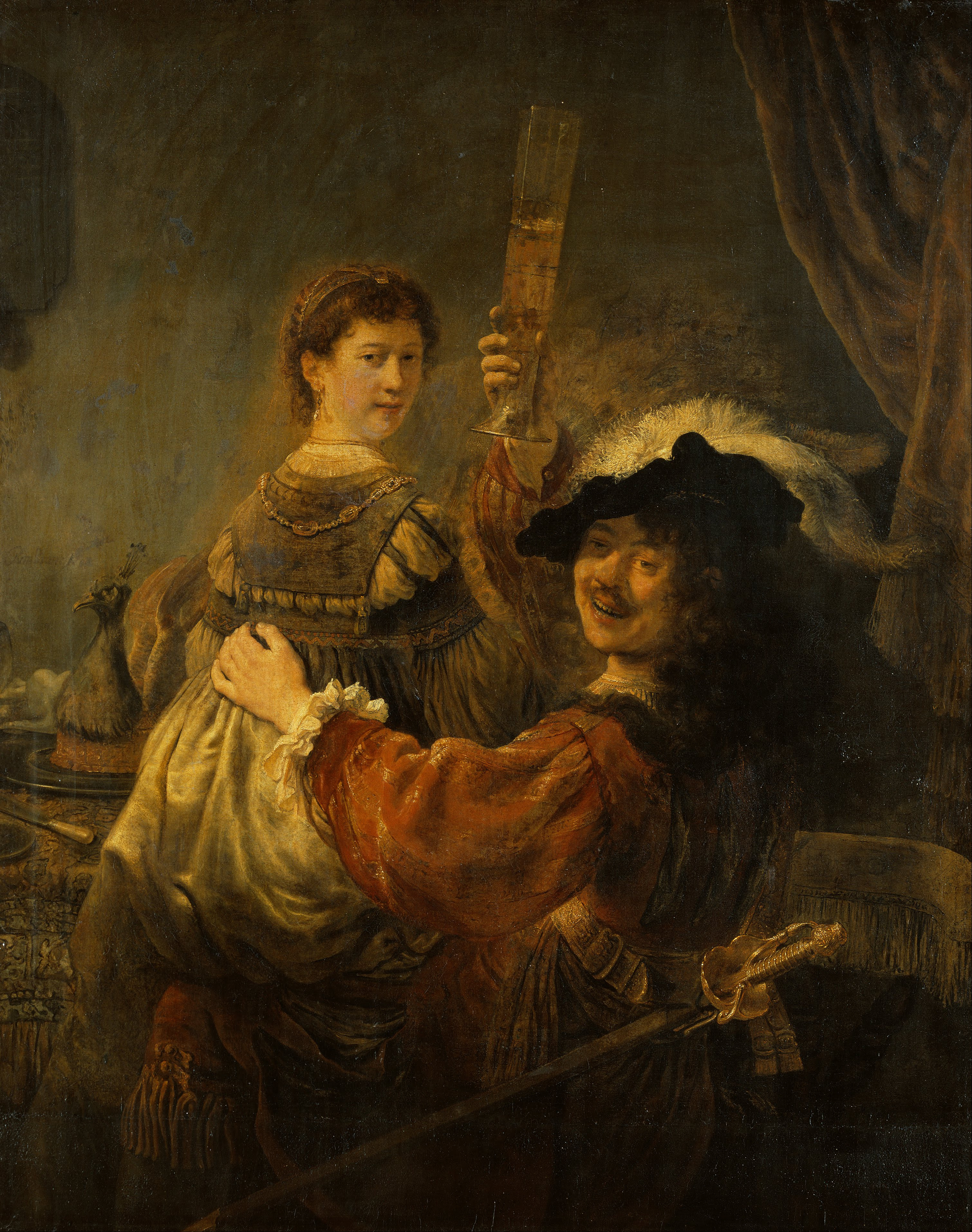
Rembrandt: The Prodigal Son in the Tavern, 1635

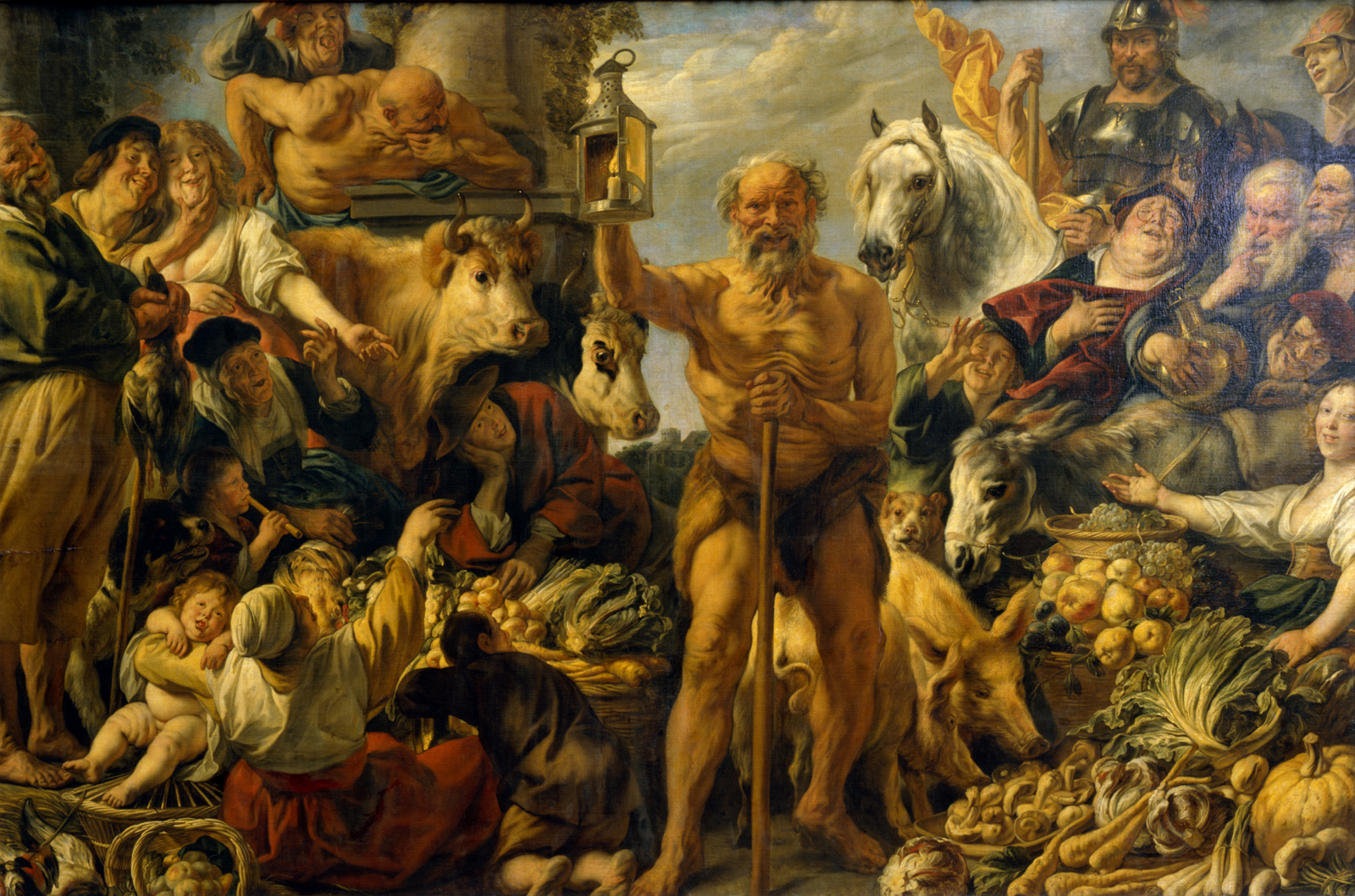
Jacob Jordaens: Diogenes Searching for an Honest Man, c. 1642

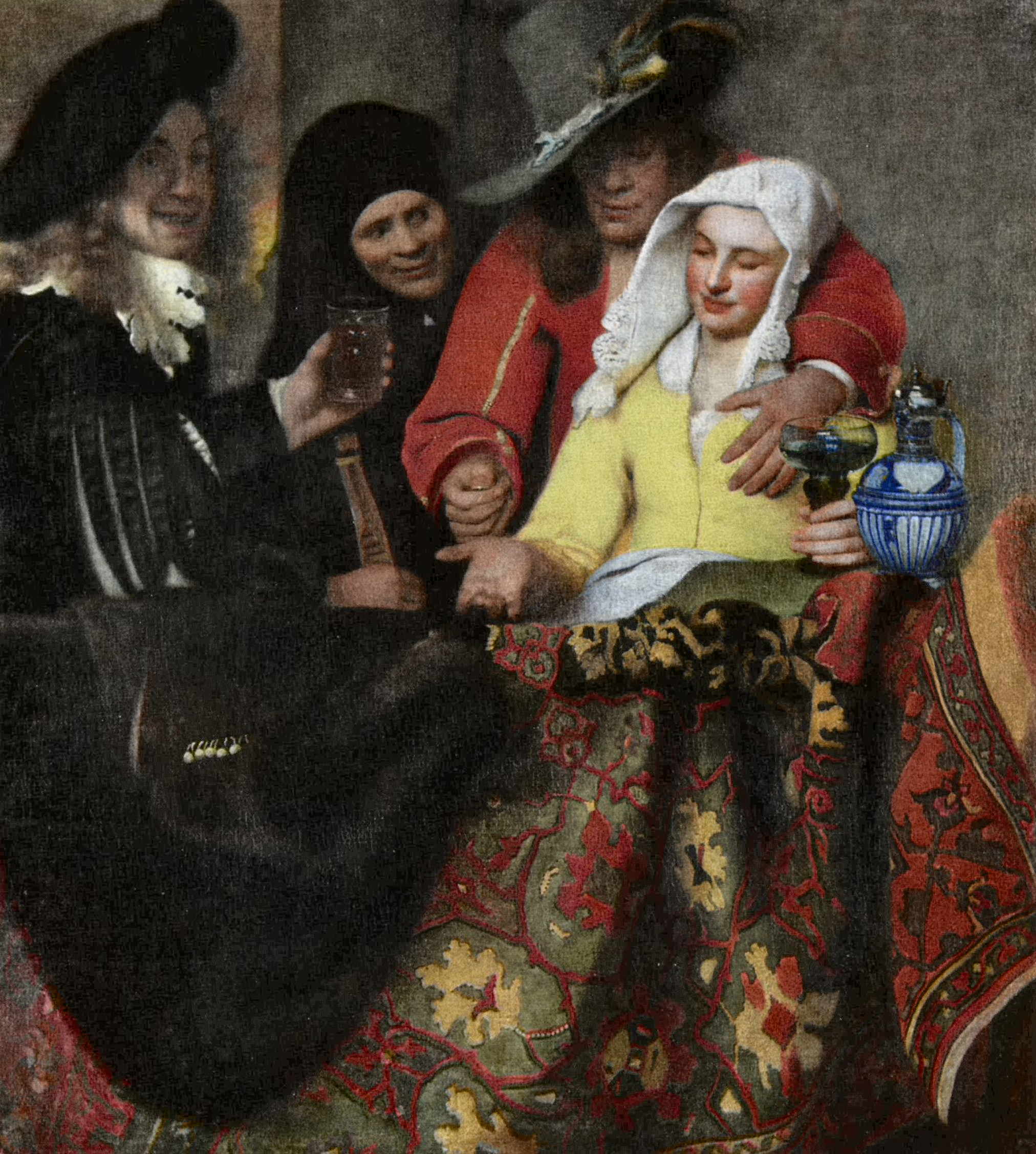
Johannes Vermeer: The Procuress, 1656

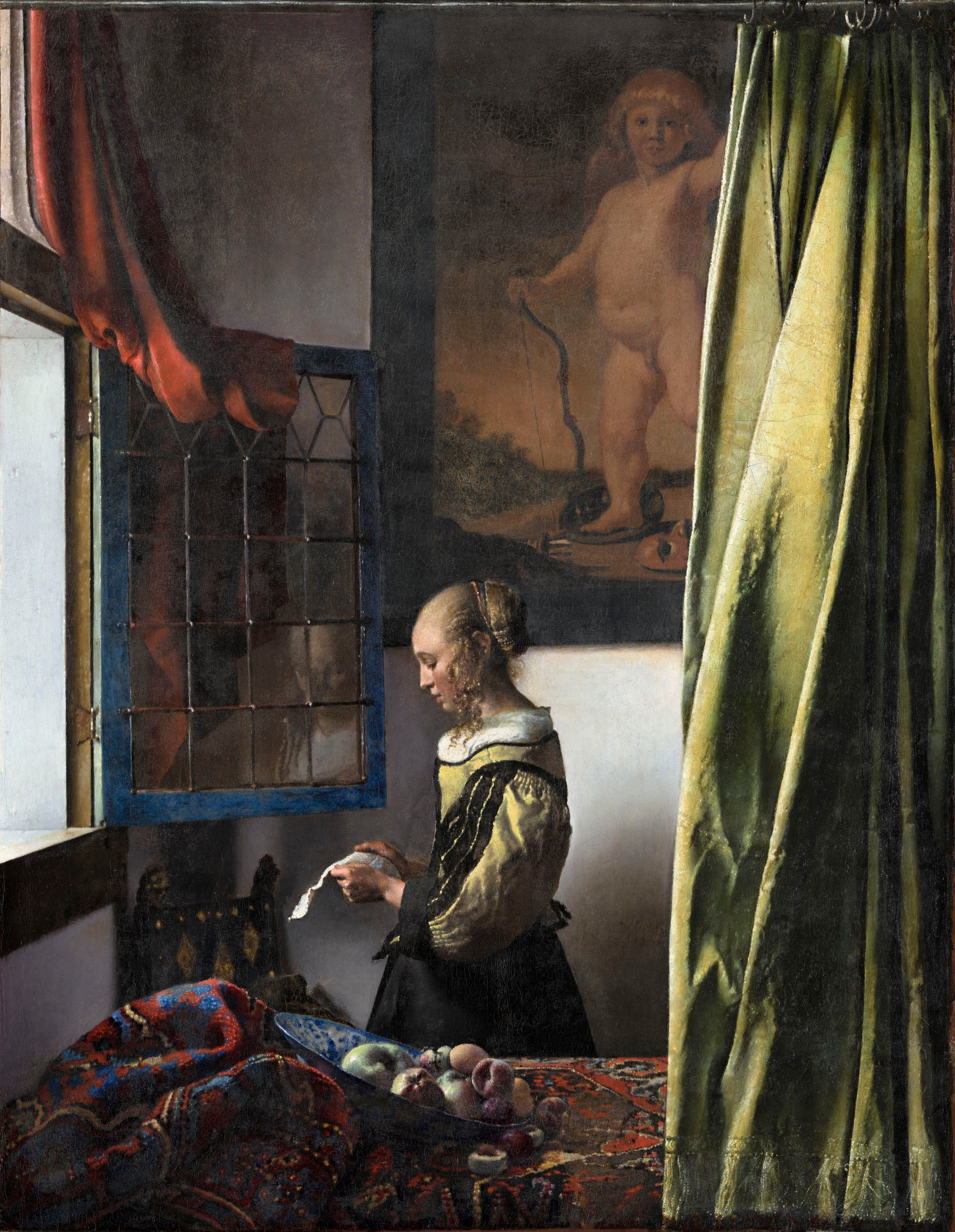
Johannes Vermeer: Girl Reading a Letter at an Open Window, c. 1659

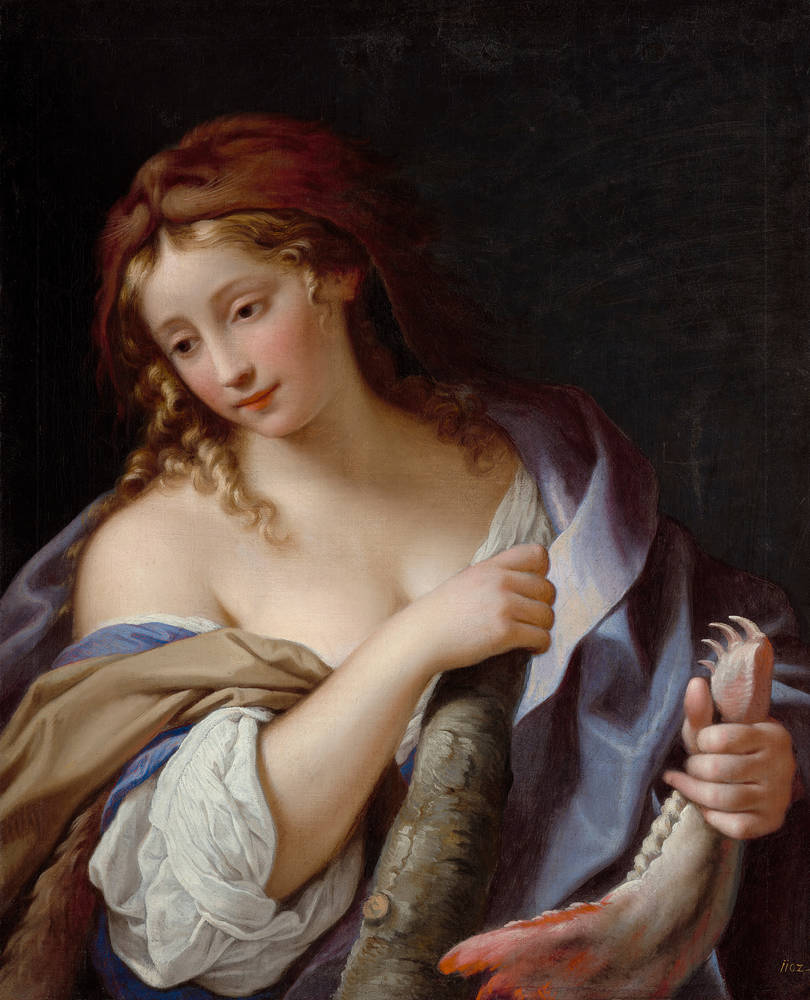
Elisabetta Sirani: Omphale, 1659/60

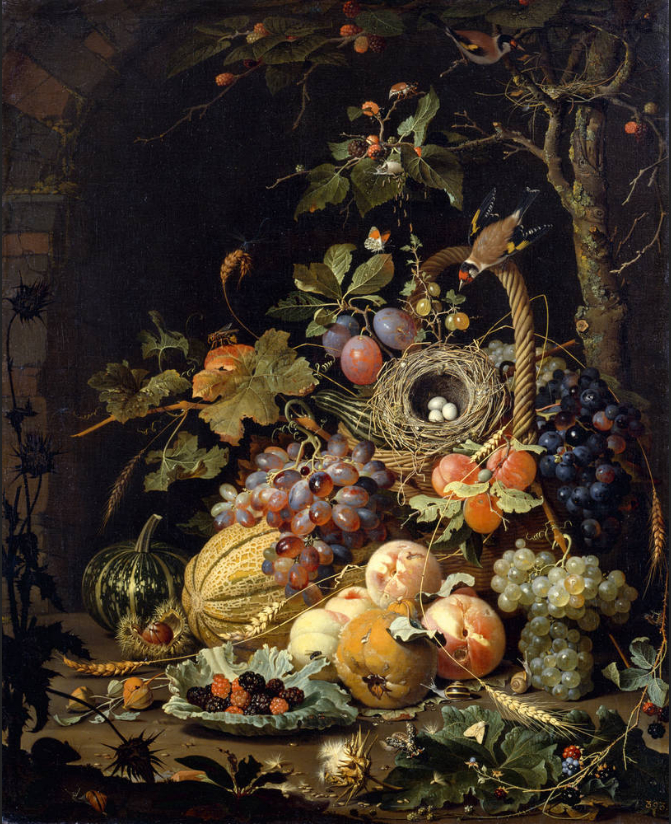
Abraham Mignon: A bird's nest in a fruit basket, c. 1665-1679

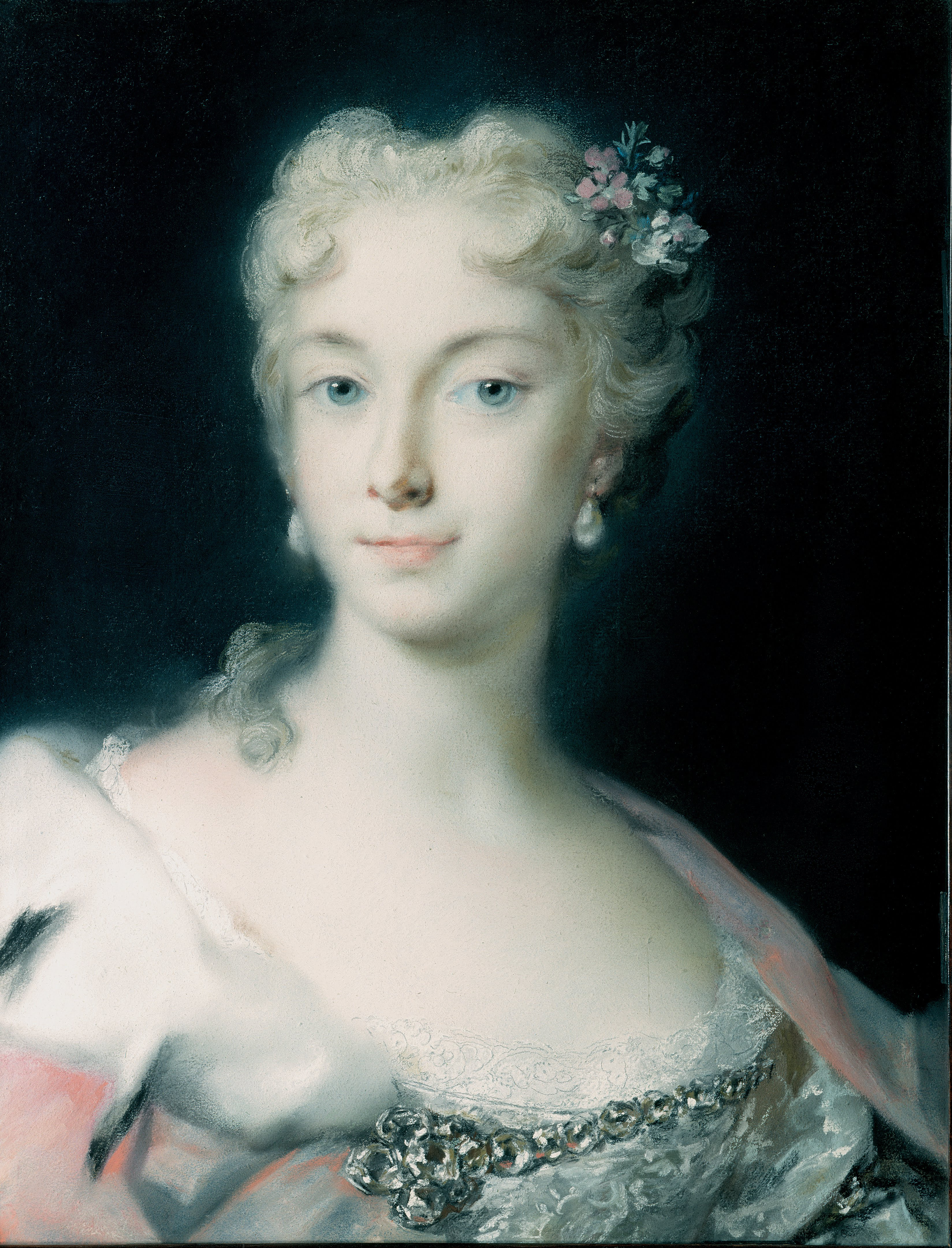
Rosalba Carriera: Maria Theresa, Archduchess of Habsburg, 1730

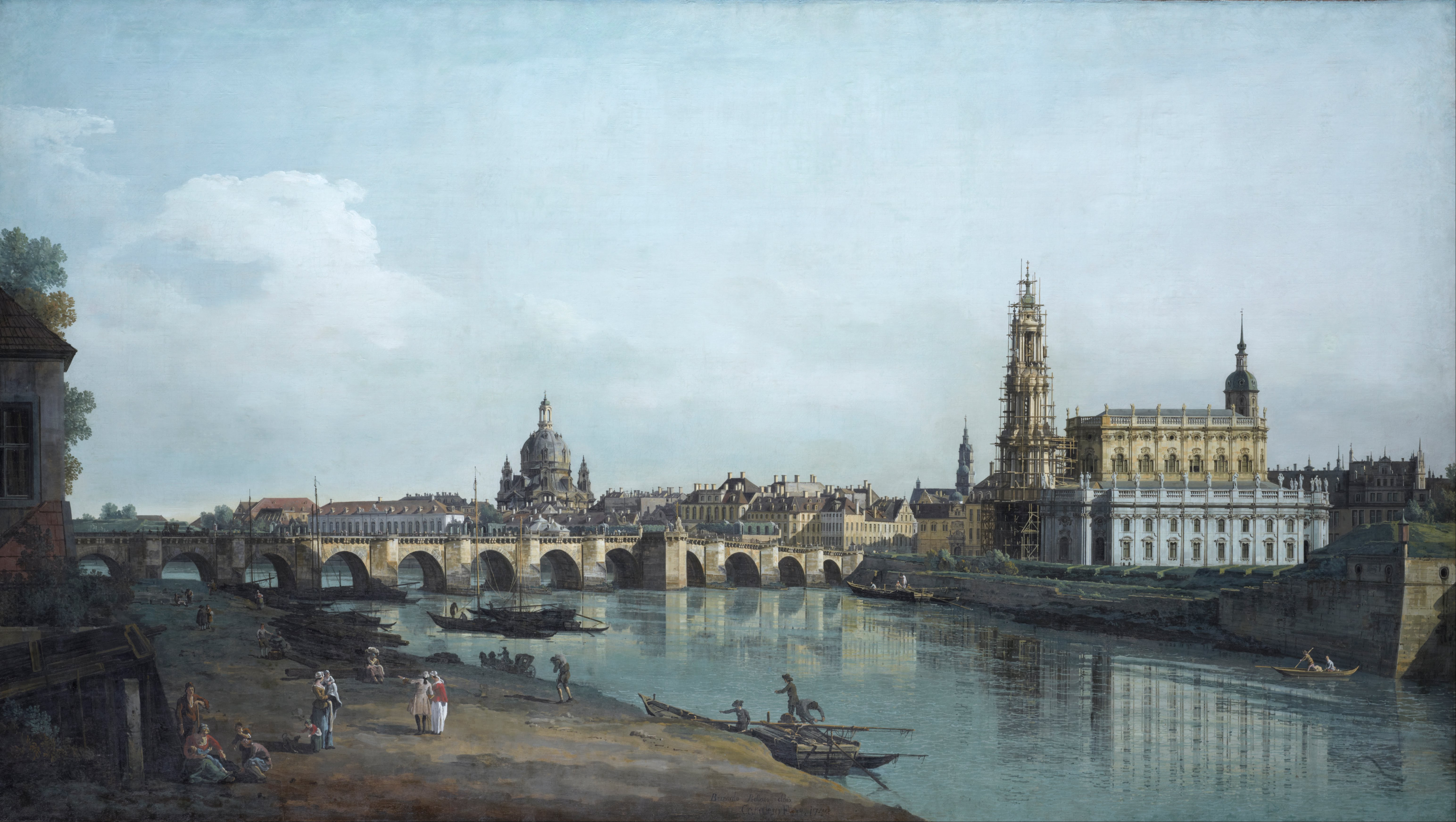
Bernardo Bellotto (Canaletto): Dresden From the Right Bank of the Elbe Below the Augustus Bridge, 1748

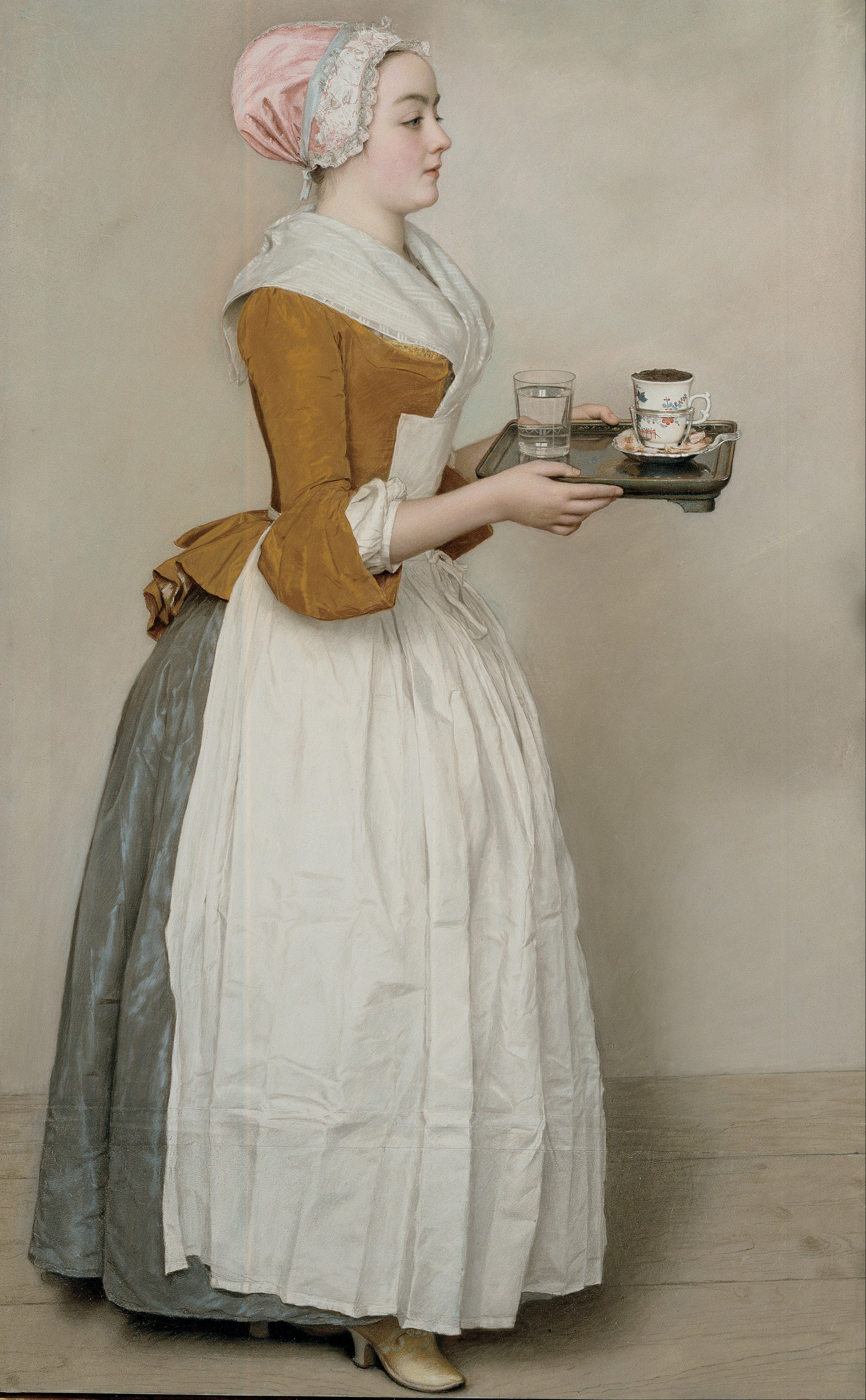
Jean-Étienne Liotard:The Chocolate Girl, 1744/45

== Other ==
- The year 2012 marked the 500th anniversary of Raphael's Dresden masterpiece Sistine Madonna, which was celebrated with a special exhibition.
- The paintings were moved from the western part of the building into the renovated eastern part in January 2016. The visible collection was reduced to approximately 400 pieces for this period. The renovation of the western part was finished in 2017.

== See also ==
- List of museums in Saxony
