= Semper Gallery =

Museum building in Dresden, Germany

Coordinates: 51°03′11″N 13°44′02″E

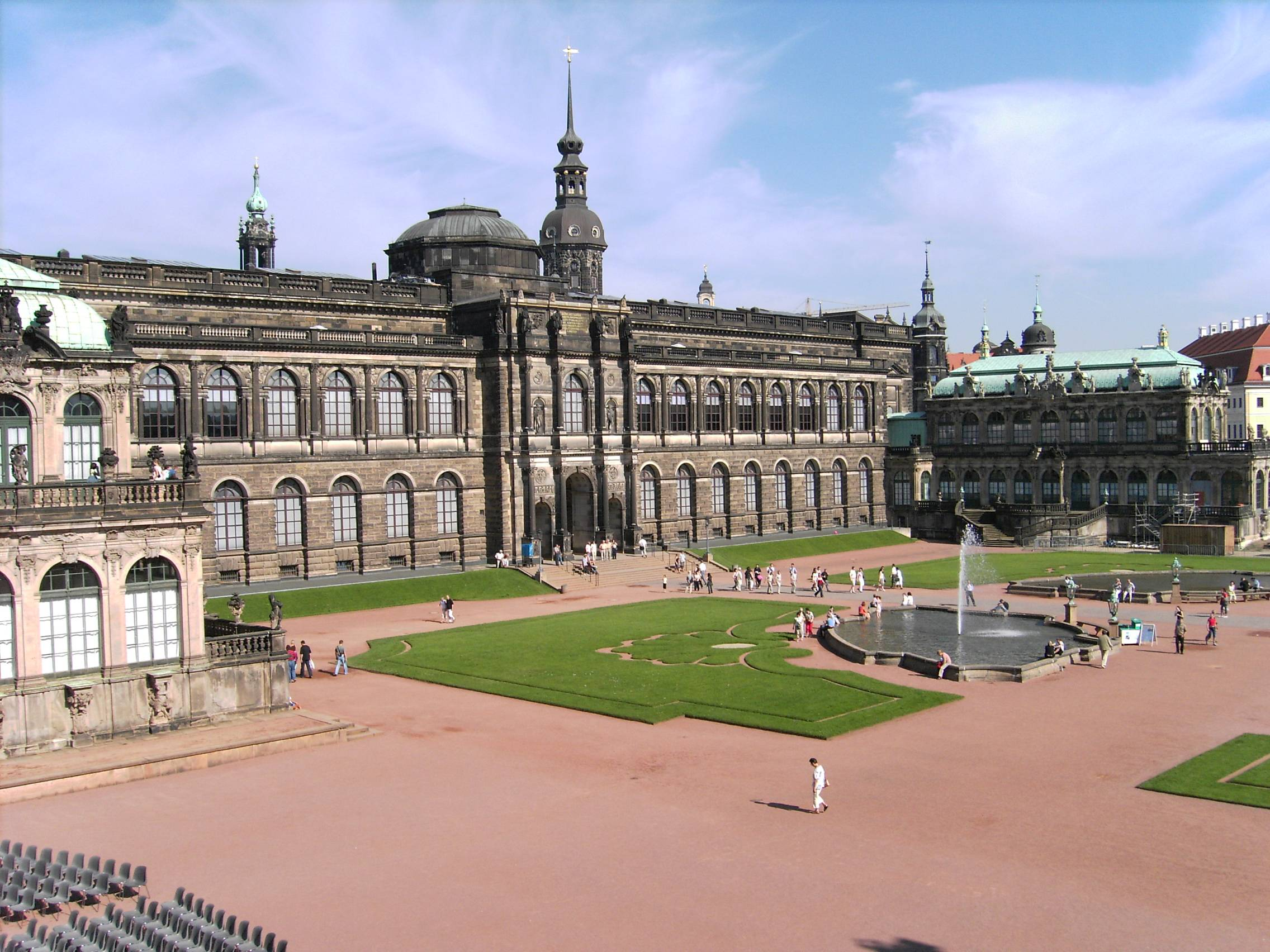
The Semper Gallery as seen from the courtyard of the Zwinger

The Semper Gallery or Semper Building (German: Sempergalerie or Semperbau) in Dresden, Germany, was designed by the architect Gottfried Semper and constructed from 1847 until 1854.

The long-stretched building in Neoclassical style closes the Zwinger courtyard on its northern side. It faces the Zwinger to the south; to the north it borders on the Theatre Square (Theaterplatz) with the Semper Opera House as well as Dresden Castle and the Catholic Church of the Royal Court (Katholische Hofkirche).

The Semper Gallery houses the Old Masters Picture Gallery (Gemäldegalerie Alte Meister).

== History ==
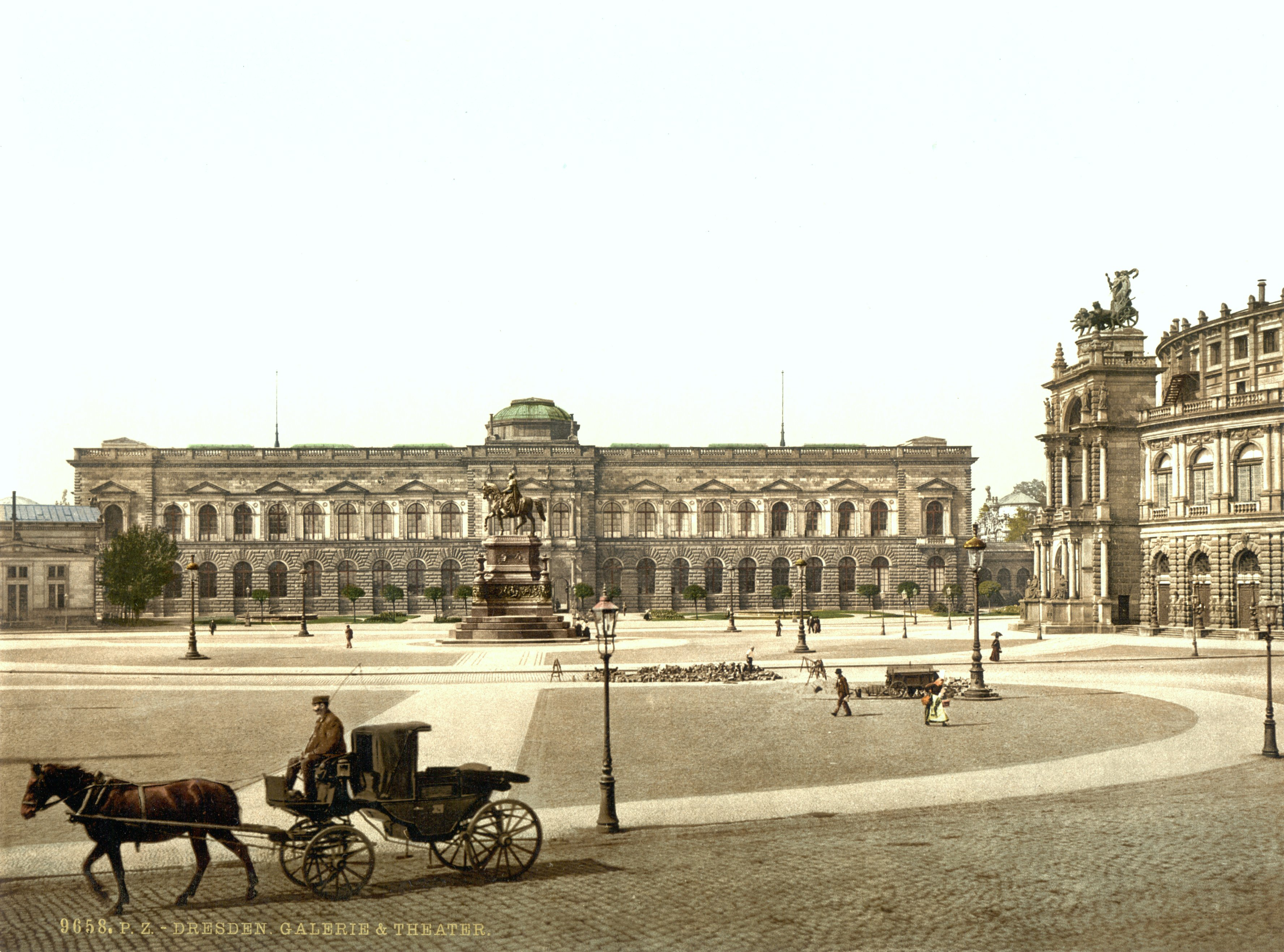
The Theater Square with the Semper Gallery and the Semperoper (right) around 1900

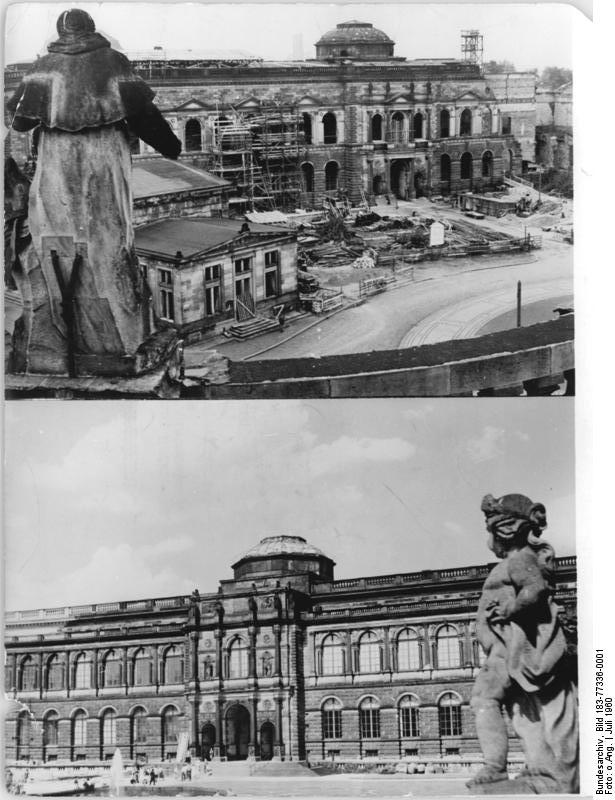
The Semper Gallery after its destruction in 1945

When the Zwinger was completed in 1728, its northern side towards the Theater Square and the river was left open in order to allow for further enlargements. In 1838, the architect Gottfried Semper was asked to design an appropriate architectural setting for the painting collection of the royal court. It was not until 1846 that it was decided to close the northern side of the Zwinger courtyard by placing the gallery building there and so creating a gallery wing of the Zwinger.

The building, later named the Semper Gallery, was constructed from 1847 until 1854. It is reminiscent of the Italian Palazzi of the Renaissance. In 1855, the interior was completed. Unlike the former buildings that housed the painting collection, the interior of the Semper Gallery could be heated and therefore could remain open throughout the year. In 1855 the collection was moved into the Semper Gallery, which opened as the New Royal Museum (Neues Königliches Museum).

The sculptors Ernst Rietschel and Ernst Julius Hähnel from Dresden completed the outer decoration of the building. While the northern facade towards the Theater Square displays antique themes, the southern facade contains paintings with religious themes.

Until World War II, the Semper Gallery housed not only the painting collection, by now named Old Masters Gallery, but also the Collection of Prints, Drawings and Photographs and the Collection of Classical Sculptures.

The building was severely damaged during the February 13, 1945 bombing of Dresden. Most of the paintings were evacuated for safe-keeping earlier and so were not harmed. The building's reconstruction was completed in 1960. Following another restoration period of more than four years, the Semper Gallery re-opened in 1992.

== See also ==
- List of castles in Saxony
- List of Baroque residences
