= Zwinger (Dresden) =

Palatial complex in Dresden, Germany

Coordinates: 51°03′11″N 13°44′02″E

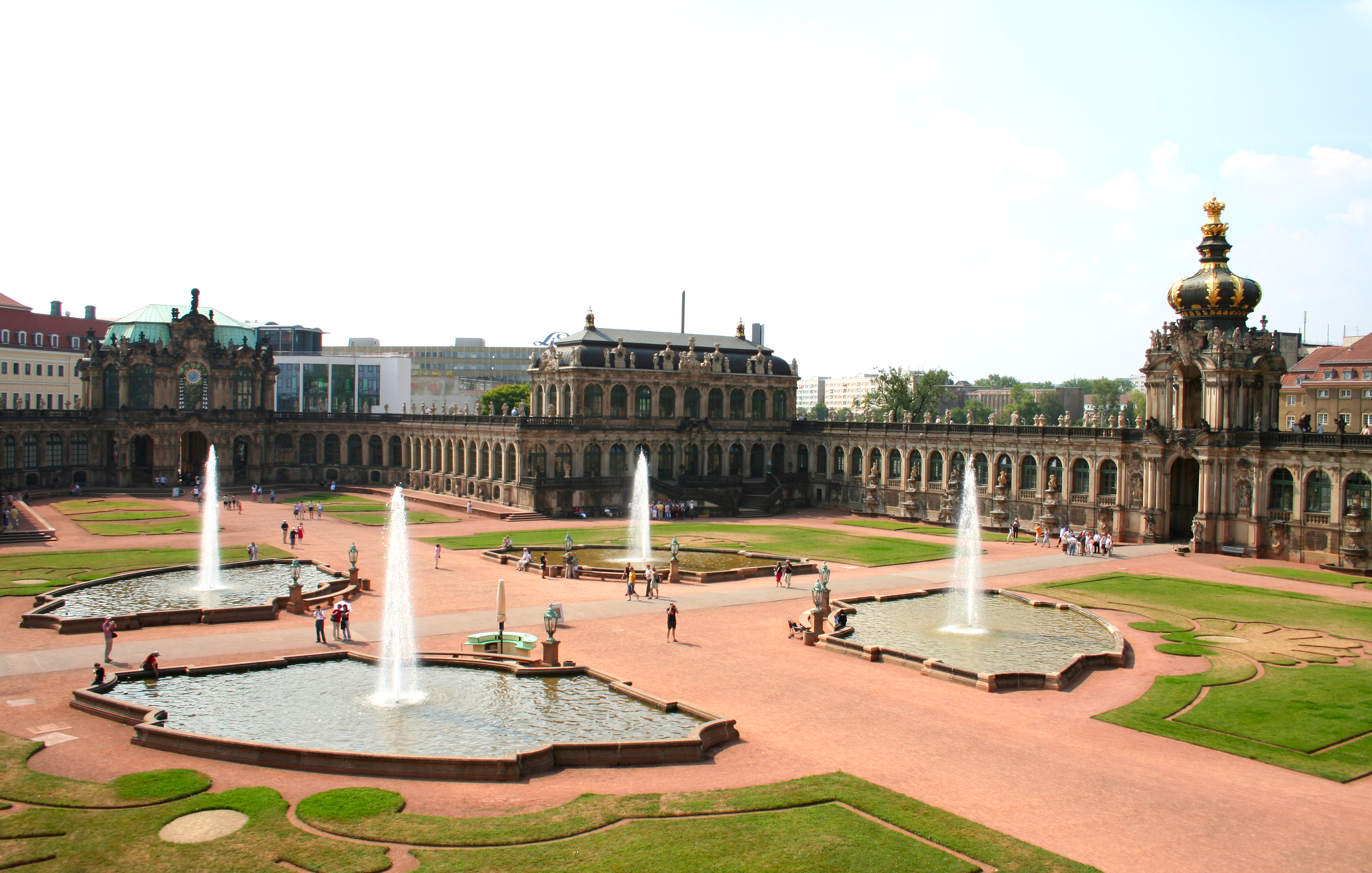

General information
- Architectural style: Neo-Renaissance, Baroque
- Location: Dresden, Germany
- Construction started: 1710
- Completed: 1728
- Client: Augustus II the Strong
- Owner: Free State of Saxony

Design and construction
- Architect: Matthäus Daniel Pöppelmann
- Other designers: Balthasar Permoser

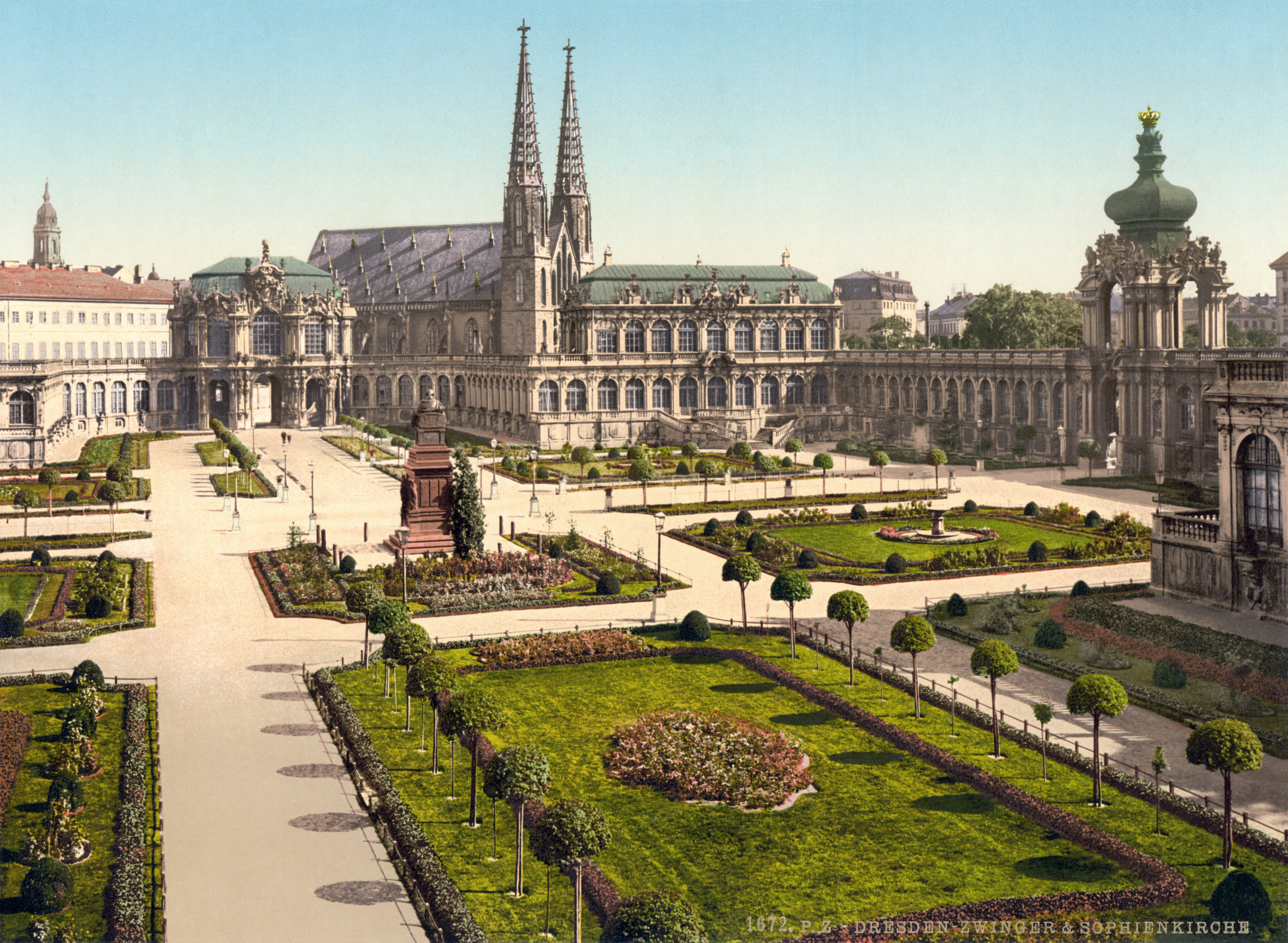
Zwinger park and memorial photochrome print around 1895

== Introduction ==
The Zwinger (German: Dresdner Zwinger, IPA: [ˈdʁeːzdnɐ ˈt͡svɪŋɐ]) is a palatial complex with gardens in Dresden, Germany. Designed by architect Matthäus Daniel Pöppelmann, it is one of the most important buildings of the Baroque period in Germany. Along with the Frauenkirche, the Zwinger is the most famous architectural monument of Dresden.

The name "Zwinger" goes back to the name used in the Middle Ages for a fortress part between the outer and inner fortress walls, even though the Zwinger no longer had a function corresponding to the name at the start of construction.

The Zwinger was built in 1709 as an orangery and garden as well as a representative festival area. Its richly decorated pavilions and the galleries lined with balustrades, figures and vases testify to the splendor during the reign of Augustus the Strong, Elector of Saxony and elected King of Poland. In the original conception of the elector, the Zwinger was the forecourt of a new castle that would take up the area between it and the Elbe; therefore, the Zwinger remained undeveloped on the Elbe side (provisionally closed with a wall). The plans for a new castle were abandoned after the death of Augustus the Strong, and with the departure from the Baroque period, the Zwinger initially lost importance. It was only over a century later that the architect Gottfried Semper completed it with the Semper Gallery towards the Elbe.

The Sempergalerie, opened in 1855, was one of the most important German museum projects of the 19th century and made it possible to expand the use of the Zwinger as a museum complex, which had grown under the influence of time since the 18th century. The Bombing of Dresden on February 13 and 14, 1945 hit the Zwinger extensively and led to extensive destruction. Since the reconstruction in the 1950s and 1960s, the Gemäldegalerie Alte Meister (Old Masters Picture Gallery), the Dresden Porcelain Collection (Dresdener Porzellansammlung) and the Mathematisch-Physikalischer Salon (Royal Cabinet of Mathematical and Physical Instruments) have opened to the public. The original intended use as an orangery, garden and as a representative festival area has taken a back seat; the latter continues to be cultivated with the performance of music and theater events.

== Current inner city location ==
The Zwinger covers an area on the northwestern edge of the Innere Altstadt ("inner old town") that is part of the historic heart of Dresden. It is located in the immediate vicinity of other famous sights, including Dresden Castle and the Semperoper. The Zwinger is bounded by Sophienstraße in the southeast, Postplatz in the south, Ostra-Allee in the southwest, the Am Zwingerteich road in the northwest and Theatre Square (Theaterplatz) in the east. Nearby buildings include the Dresden State Theatre to the southwest, the Haus am Zwinger to the south, the Taschenbergpalais hotel to the southeast, the west wing of the palace with its Green Vault to the east, the Altstädtische Hauptwache to the northeast, the Semper Opera to the north and the former royal stables to the northwest. Within view lie the Catholic Court Church and the Italian Village in Theatre Square, the Wilsdruffer Kubus on Postplatz and the Duchess Garden with the remnants of the former orangery building in the west. The terraced banks of the Elbe river are located 200 metres northeast of the Zwinger. The crown gate is named the "Kronentor" and is one of the more notable monuments in the Zwinger.

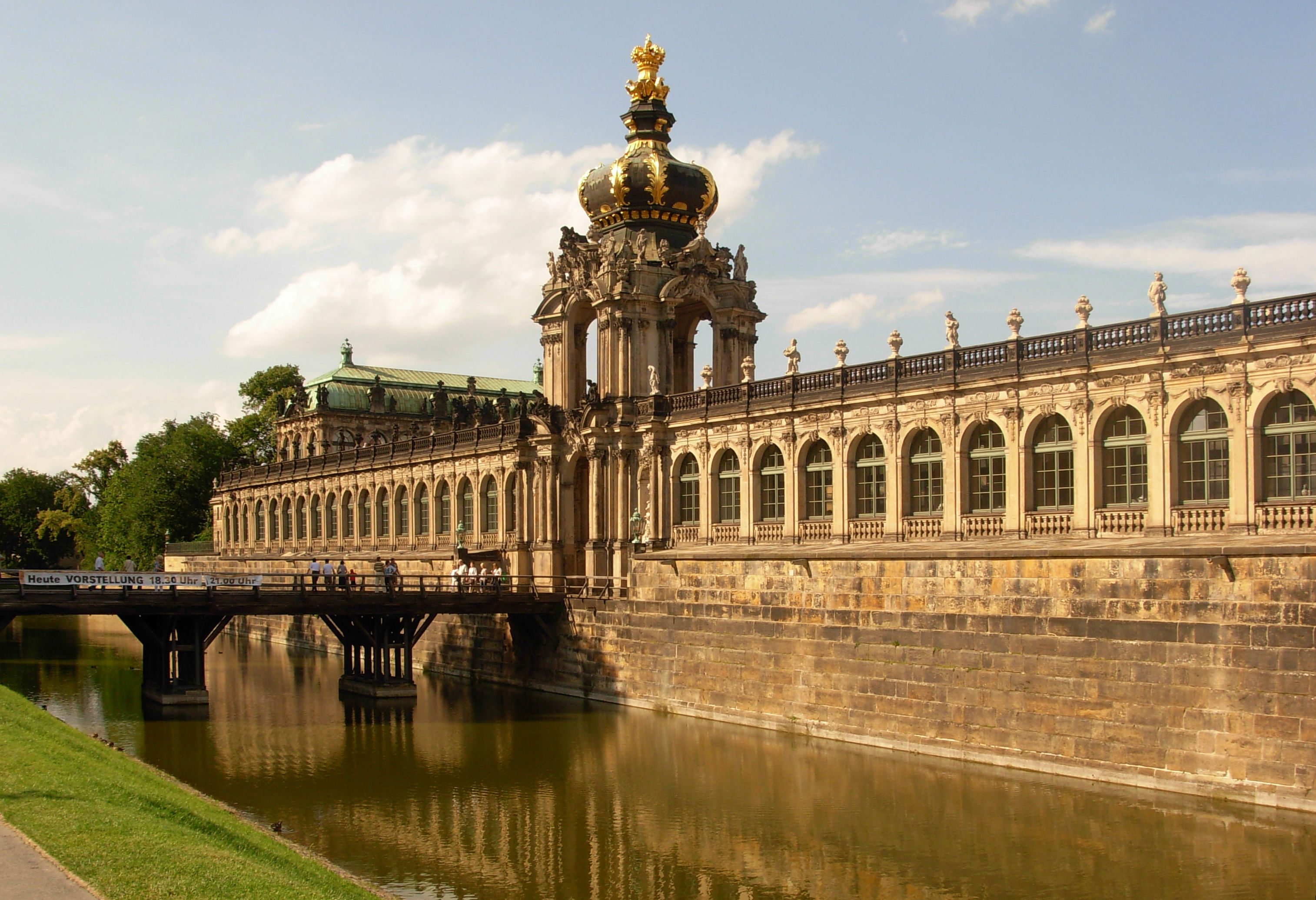
The Kronentor (crown gate) with the long galleries adjoining on both sides

== Kronentor ==
The Kronentor is the name of the crown gate. The Kronentor was built and finished in 1714 as an add-on to the Zwinger. The Kronentor is also a national monument, built with dark wood and gold in the shape of the Polish crown, further cementing Augustus II the Strong's claim to the Polish throne. The Kronentor also has four Polish eagles and mythological deities like Hercules and Mars (mythology). The Kronentor was built by Matthäus Daniel Pöppelmann and Balthasar Permoser. The Kronentor was damaged during 1945 but has been rebuilt to its original form after World War II. The Kronentor is still around today.

== Claim to the throne ==
Around 20 years before the construction of the Zwinger, Augustus II the Strong would have to do a lot of things before becoming King of Poland. Because Augustus was a Protestant when he was Electorate of Saxony, he secretly converted to Roman Catholicism to make himself eligible for the elective throne. During the 1697 election, there was speculation around who was truly king since Augustus II supporters claimed he was king, but some other people thought François Louis, Prince of Conti was king of Poland also. So Augustus marched his troops into the Polish–Lithuanian Commonwealth to secure himself as king, which succeeded heavily. It is thought the construction of the Zwinger is to show Augustus II commitment to being the king of Poland.

== Origin of the name ==
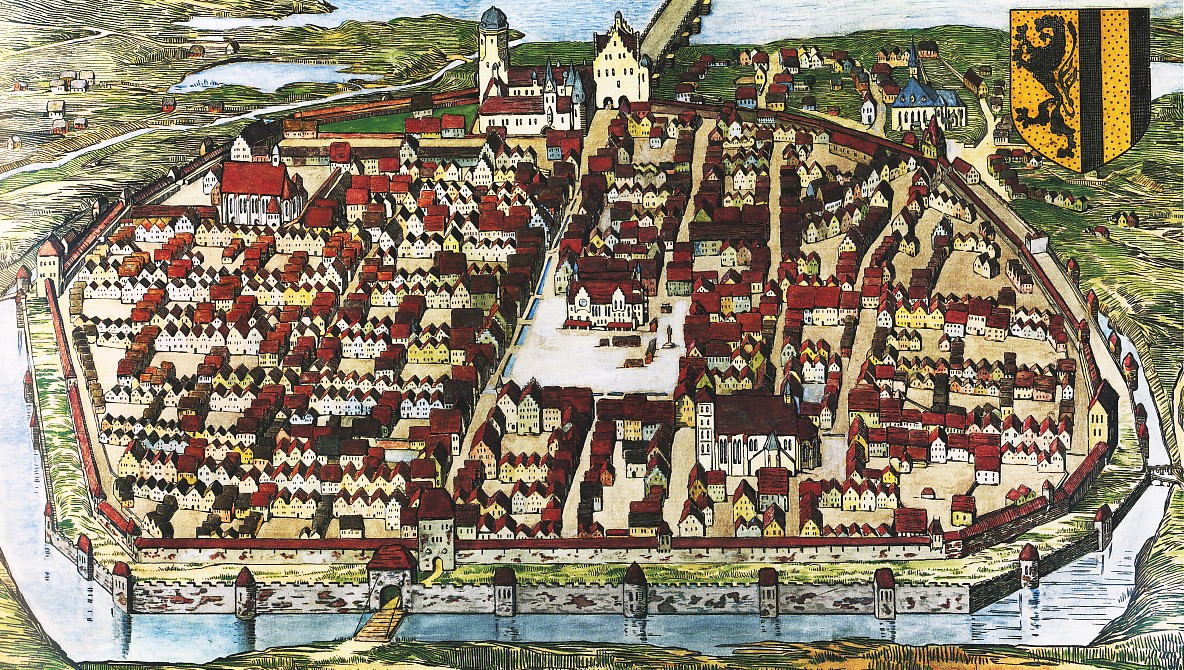
Dresden before 1519 with the course of the nearby Weißeritz river (top left)

The name Zwinger goes back to the common medieval German term for that part of a fortification between the outer and inner defensive walls, or "outer ward". Archaeological evidence indicates that the construction of the first city wall took place in the last quarter of the 12th century. A documentary entry as civitas in 1216 points to the existence of an enclosed Dresden Fortification at that time. In 1427, during the Hussite Wars, work began on strengthening the city's defences and they were enhanced by a second – outer – wall. These improvements began near the Wilsdruffer Tor gate. Step by step the old moat had to be filled in and moved. The area between the two walls was generally referred to as the Zwinger and, in the vicinity of the castle, was utilised by the royal court at Dresden for garden purposes. The location of the so-called Zwingergarten from that period is only imprecisely known to be between the fortifications on the western side of the city. Its extent varied in places as a result of subsequent improvements to the fortifications and is depicted differently on the various maps.

This royal Zwingergarten, a garden used to supply the court, still fulfilled one of its functions, as indicated by the name, as a narrow defensive area between the outer and inner defensive walls. This was no longer the case when work on the present-day Zwinger palace began in the early 18th century, nevertheless the name was transferred to the new building. Admittedly the southwestern parts of the building of the baroque Dresden Zwinger including the Kronentor gate stand on parts of the outer curtain wall that are still visible today; but there is no longer any trace of the inner wall.

== Early development of the city in the area of the Zwinger ==
Until well into the 16th century, the area of the present-day Zwinger complex was still outside the city fortifications. Close by ran an old stretch of the Weißeritz river that no longer exists, which emptied into the Elbe by the Old Castle. In 1569, major work began on redevelopment and new buildings by the fortifications west of the castle based on plans by master builder, Rochus Quirin, Count of Lynar, who came from Florence. The embankments needed in the area of the river confluence proved to be a major challenge. In spring 1570 the Weißeritz caused severe flood damage at an embankment, which hampered the building project for a short time. Then, in 1572, the rebuilding work by the fortifications came to a temporary halt.

== Early history ==
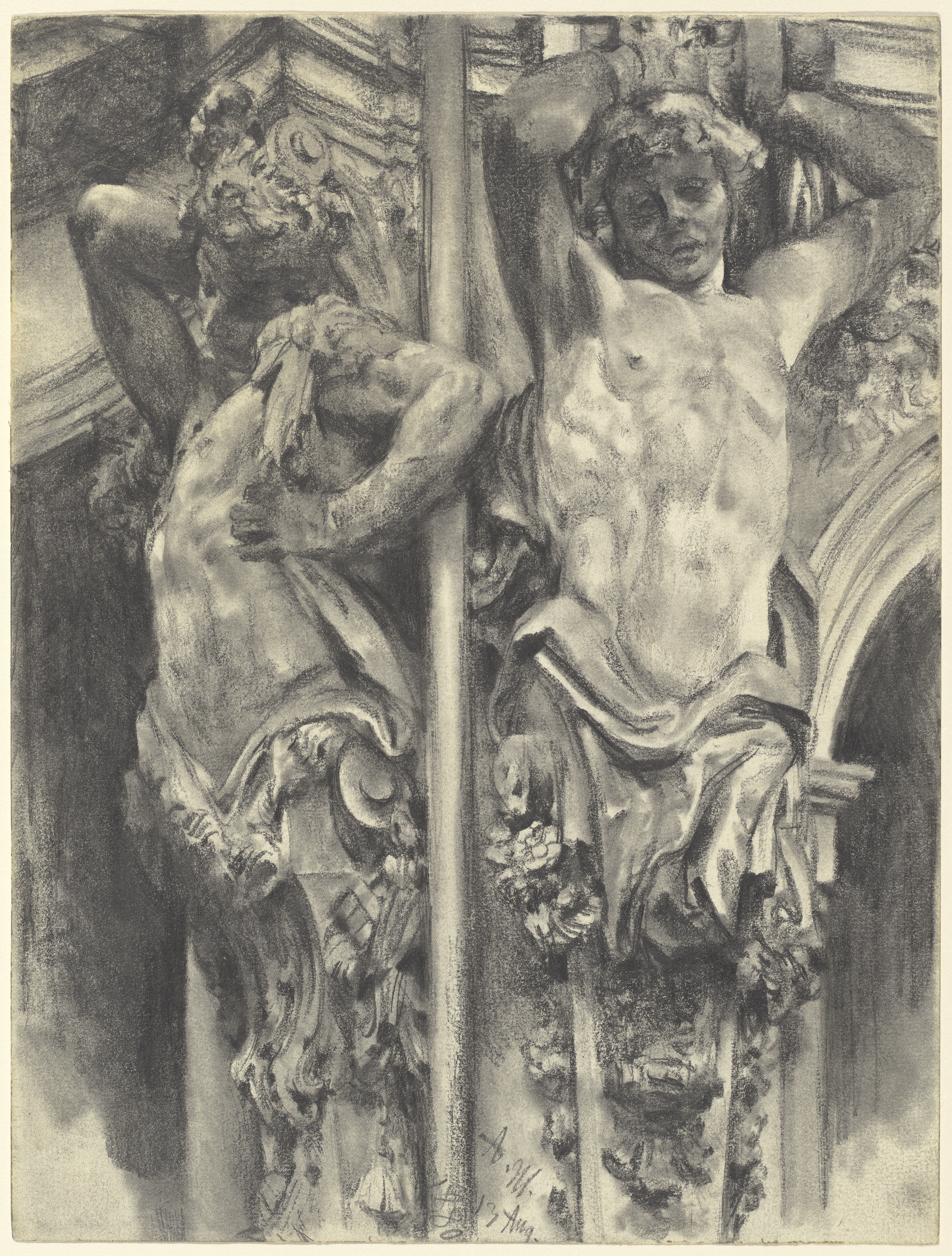
Adolph Menzel, Atlases on the Wallpavillon of the Dresden Zwinger, 1880, NGA 139216, National Gallery of Art

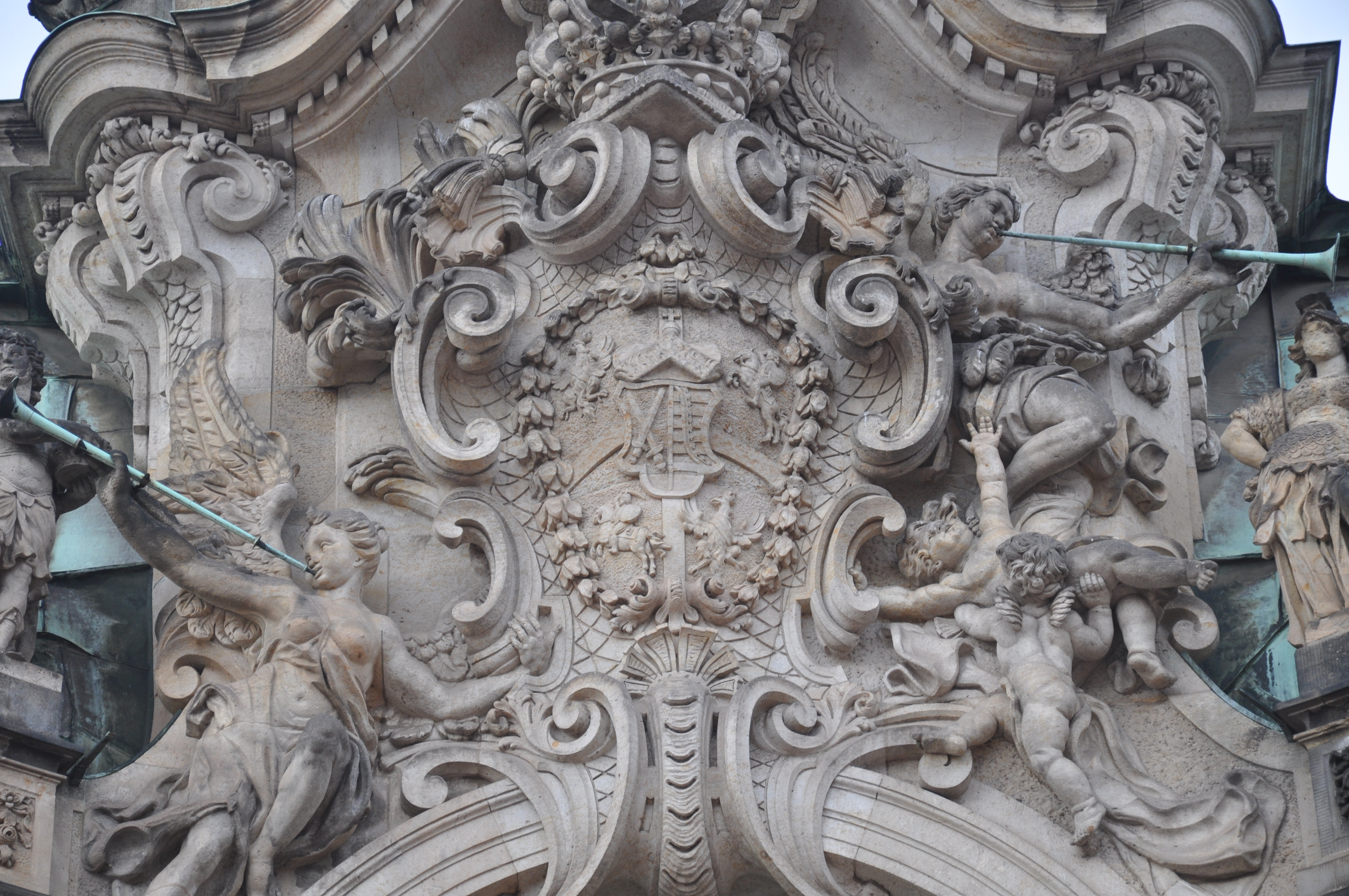
Coat of arms of the Polish–Lithuanian Commonwealth on the Wallpavillon

Augustus the Strong returned from a grand tour through France and Italy in 1687–89, just at the moment that Louis XIV moved his court to Versailles. On his return to Dresden, having arranged his election as King of Poland (1697), he wanted something similarly spectacular for himself. The fortifications were no longer needed and provided readily available space for his plans. The original plans, as developed by his court architect Matthäus Daniel Pöppelmann before 1711, covered the space of the present complex of palace and garden, and also included as gardens the space down to the Elbe river, upon which the Semperoper and its square were built in the nineteenth century.

The Zwinger was designed by Pöppelmann and constructed in stages from 1710 to 1728. Sculpture was provided by Balthasar Permoser. The Zwinger was formally inaugurated in 1719, on the occasion of the electoral prince Frederick August's marriage to the daughter of the Habsburg emperor, the Archduchess Maria Josepha. At the time, the outer shells of the buildings had already been erected and, with their pavilions and arcaded galleries, formed a striking backdrop to the event. It was not until the completion of their interiors in 1728, however, that they could serve their intended functions as exhibition galleries and library halls.

The death of Augustus in 1733 put a halt to the construction because the funds were needed elsewhere. The palace area was left open towards the Semperoper square (Theatre Square) and the river. Later the plans were changed to a smaller scale, and in 1847–1855 the area was closed by the construction of the gallery wing now separating the Zwinger from the Theatre Square. The architect of this building, later named Semper Gallery, was Gottfried Semper.

=== Destruction and rebuilding ===
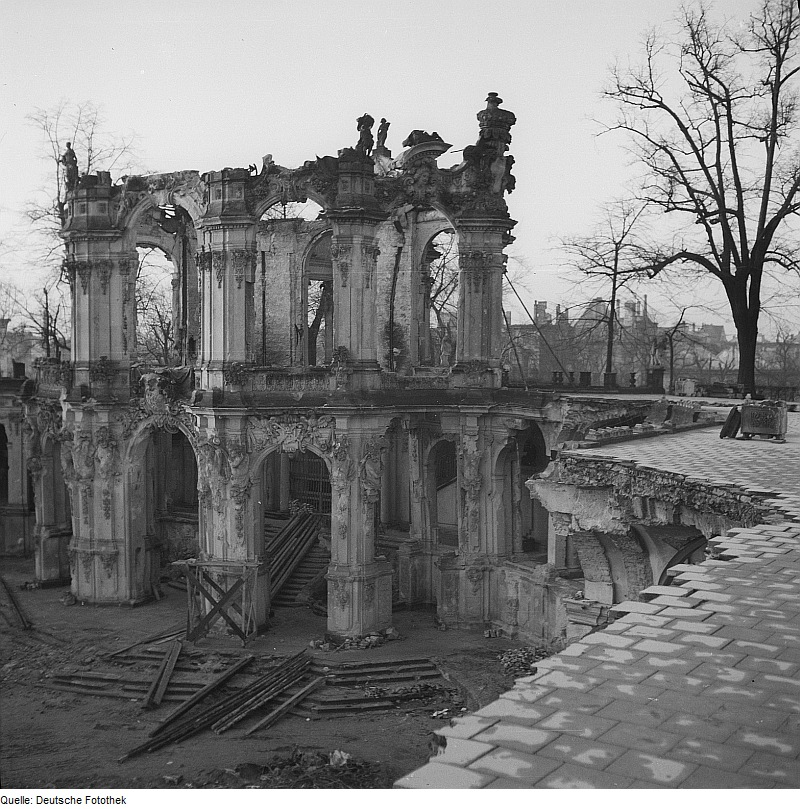
Ruins of the wall pavilion in 1945

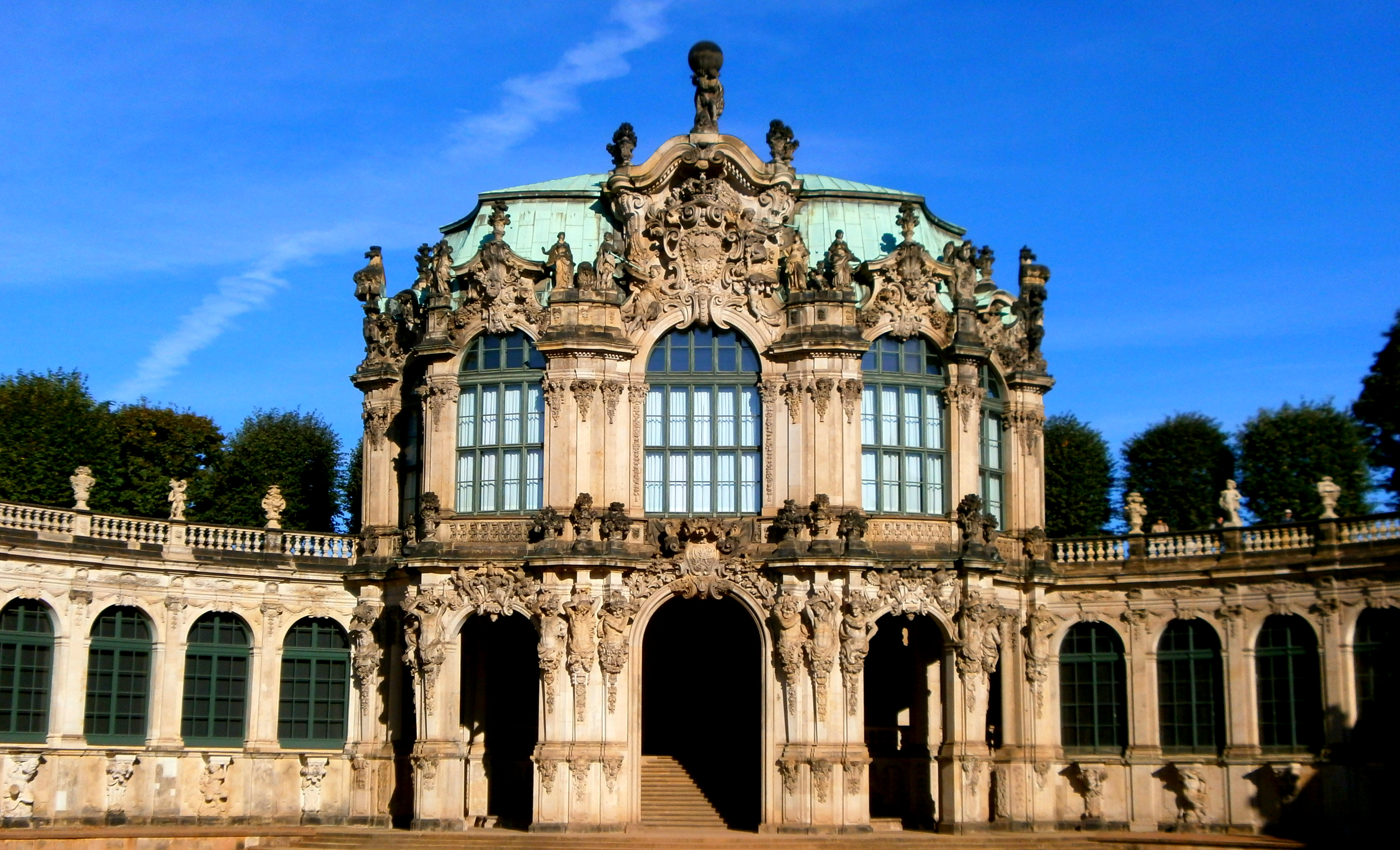
Wall pavilion in 2013

The building was mostly destroyed by the carpet bombing raids of 13–15 February 1945. The art collection had been previously evacuated, however. Reconstruction, supported by the Soviet military administration, began in 1945; parts of the restored complex were opened to the public in 1951. By 1963 the Zwinger had largely been restored to its pre-war state.

== See also ==
- Pillnitz Castle – Summer residence of the electors and kings of Saxony
- Moritzburg Castle – Hunting lodge of the electors and kings of Saxony
- List of castles in Saxony
- List of Baroque residences
