= San Ruffillo Madonna =

Fresco fragment by Pontormo

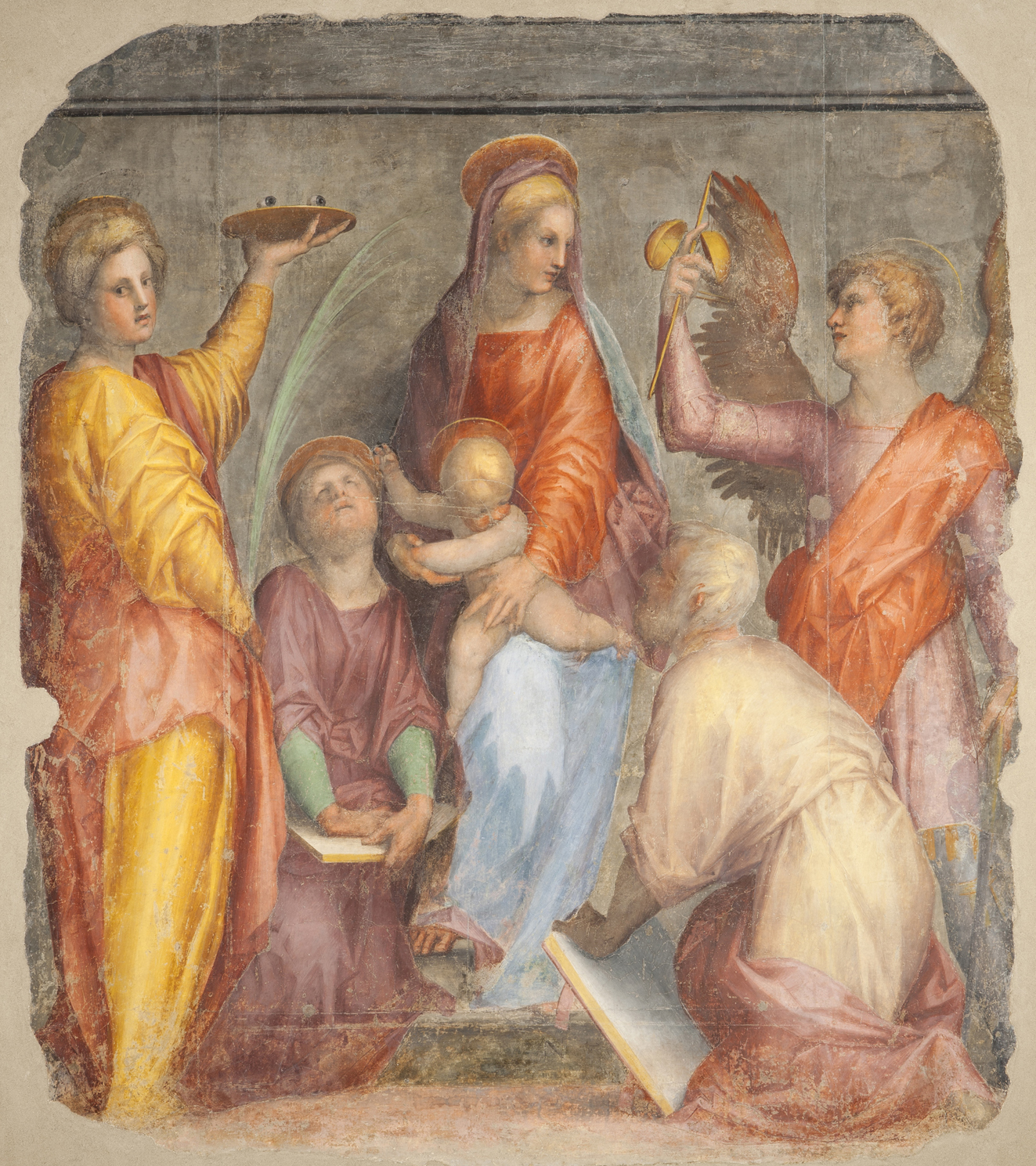
San Ruffillo Madonna (c. 1514) by Pontormo

The San Ruffillo Madonna is a fresco fragment by Pontormo, executed around 1514, originally located in the San Ruffillo church in Florence.

An early work by the artist, produced soon after finishing his training Andrea del Sarto's studio, it is now owned by the Accademia delle arti del disegno. At least three preparatory drawings for it survive in the Kupferstich-Kabinett, Dresden, the Biblioteca dell'Accademia Nazionale dei Lincei e Corsinianain Rome and the Uffizi's Gabinetto dei Disegni e delle Stampe. The two framing standing figures are saint Lucy (left) holding up a plate with her eyes and Michael the Archangel holding a pair of scales by the cups. Either side of the Madonna and Child kneel Saint Agnes and Zechariah.

It was detached on a section of wall before the church was demolished in 1823 and moved to the San Luca Chapel in Santissima Annunziata, Florence, which was then being rearranged and where it is now displayed, blocking the old doorway. An upper section showing God the Father and cherubim was destroyed during the detachment.

It was removed from the wall again while the church was restored following the 1966 Florence flood. This revealed a sinopia with traces of colours, possibly for another work, attributed to Raffaellino del Garbo. It is thought to have remained visible until Pontormo painted his work over it, for which he made a now-barely-visible under-drawing.
