= Ottoman tent =

Tents used by the Ottoman sultans and army

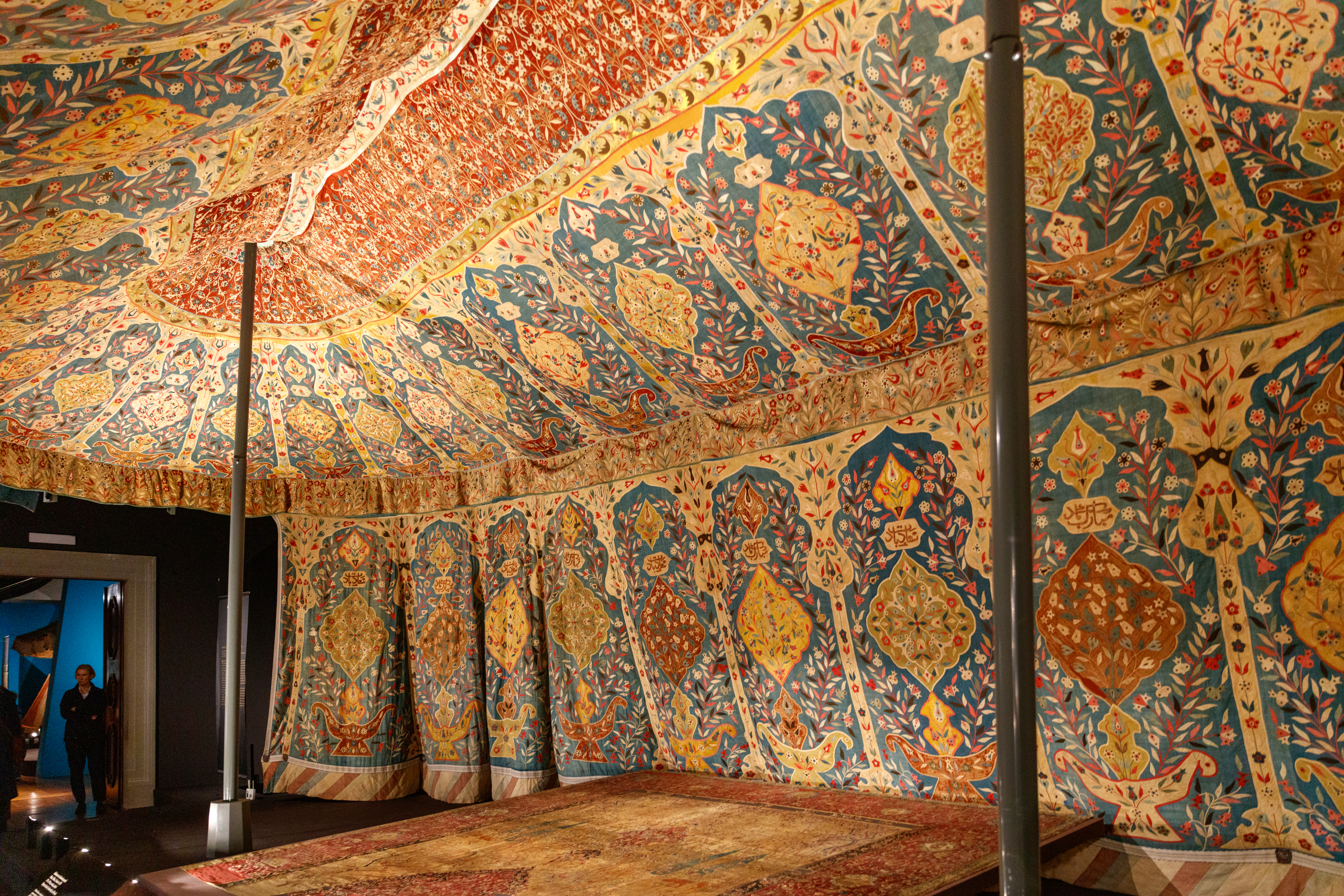
A 17th-century Ottoman tent housed at the Wawel Castle museum in Kraków, Poland

Ottoman tents were fabric architectural structures used by the Ottoman Empire. They were versatile structures that could be transported and erected anywhere, from the battlefield to palatial gardens. These portable structures served as everything from simple soldiers' tents to large imperial fabric palaces. In particular, the monumental decorated fabric structures belonging to the sultan were strategically deployed to display the Ottoman Empire’s military might, international influence, and imperial power on special occasions. Unlike permanent built forms, tents could be reused in various locales for different purposes, giving them the advantage of versatility.

== Imperial use ==
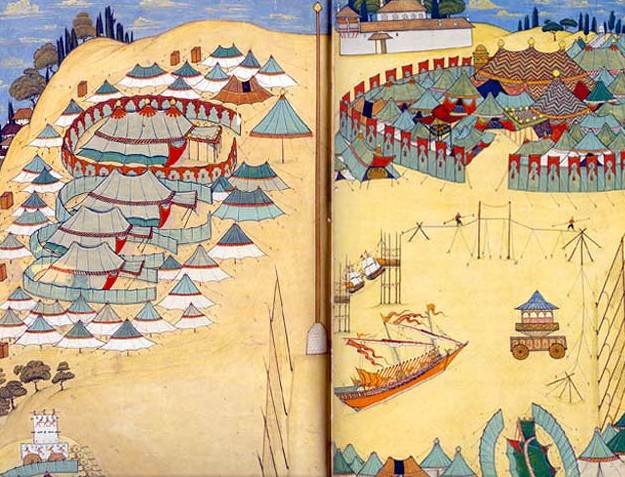
Manuscript pages depicting the encampment erected for the circumcision ceremony of Sultan Ahmed III's sons. From the Surname-ı Vehbi, kept at the Topkapı Sarayı Müzesi, Istanbul.

The empire's territorial spread was catalyzed by tent usage, namely for military campaigns. Tents were able to be adapted to the geography of the land as the sultan's armies were on the move, and as such large encampments could be set up and removed quickly without disturbing the surrounding environment.

During military campaigns, a sultan would have a large complex of tents at his disposal, called Otağ-ı Hümayun. Two sets of tents would accompany the sultan and his army or entourage while traveling: one would be in use while the other would be sent further ahead and readied for the sultan's pending arrival. The Otağ-ı Hümayun was not only a military headquarters but also a home away from home, and provided amenities such as kitchen tents and bathroom tents. The Otağ-ı Hümayun was also surrounded by a large fabric wall called zokak to create a private enclosure.

Imperial tents would also be erected in palace gardens to create an area for leisure activities or respite from the sun. In other cases, they would be used as a stage for state ceremonies and related celebrations, including the circumcision festival held in honor of the sultan's sons coming of age.

== The tent corps ==
The Ottoman Imperial Tent Corps resided in the Palace of Ibrahim Pasha where they were responsible for tent manufacturing, repairs, pitching, and transporting tents. The Corps also produced furnishings for imperial palaces, pavilions, and caiques.

== Structure, decoration, and materials ==
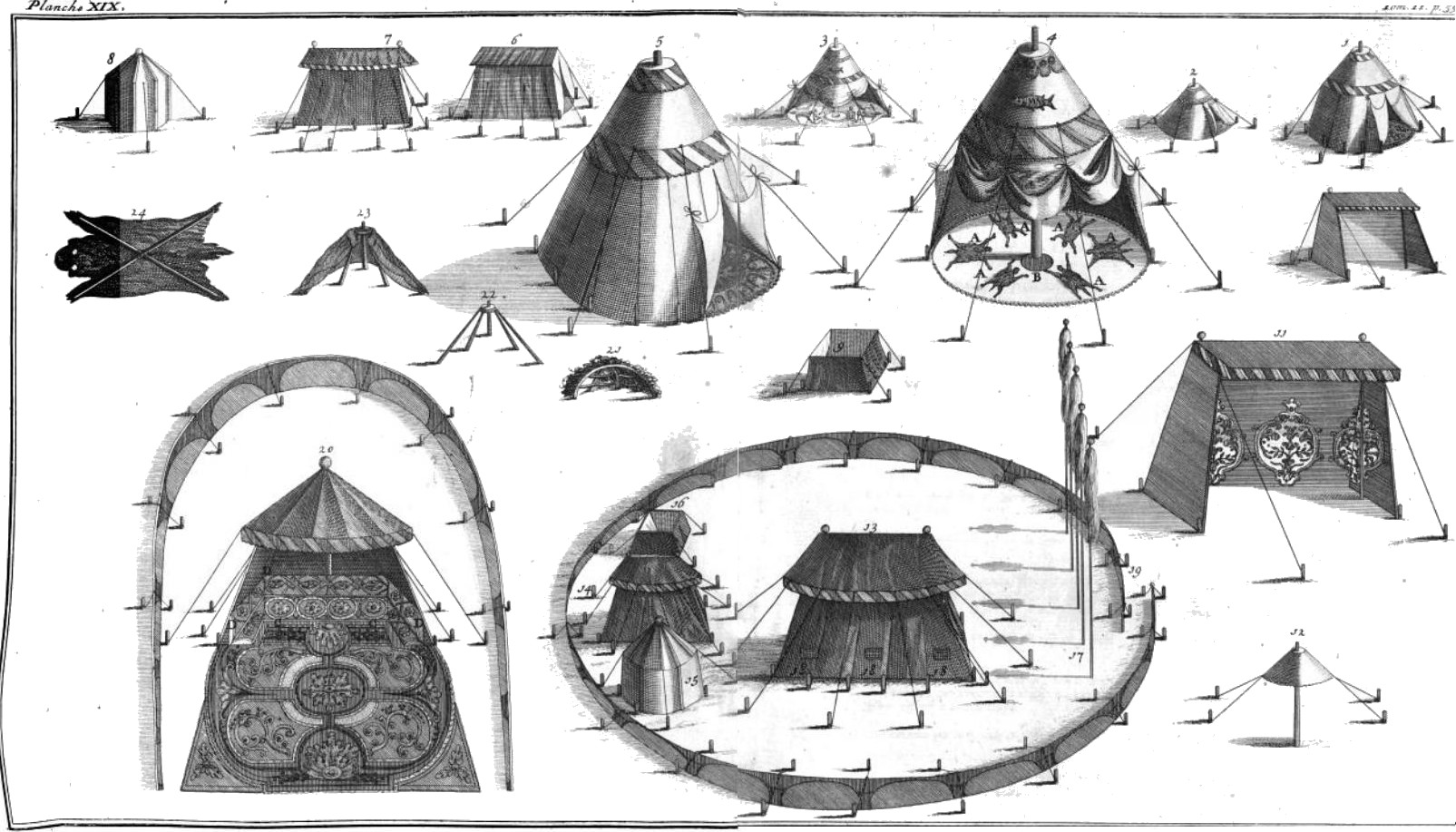
Drawing of the Ottoman Empire's military tents by Luigi Ferdinando Marsigli (1658–1730).

The basic structure of all Ottoman tents includes an outer shell and an inner shell that are held together with toggles and loops, and erected with struts and dowels. The outer shell is made of a sturdier fabric like broadcloth or canvas to keep the interior warm; the Imperial Tent Corps would coat this outer shell in wax or oil to protect it from the elements. The inner shell is often highly decorated and features a variety of materials; including cotton, silk, and gilt leather, and in later centuries also sequins, chenille, and metallic threads.

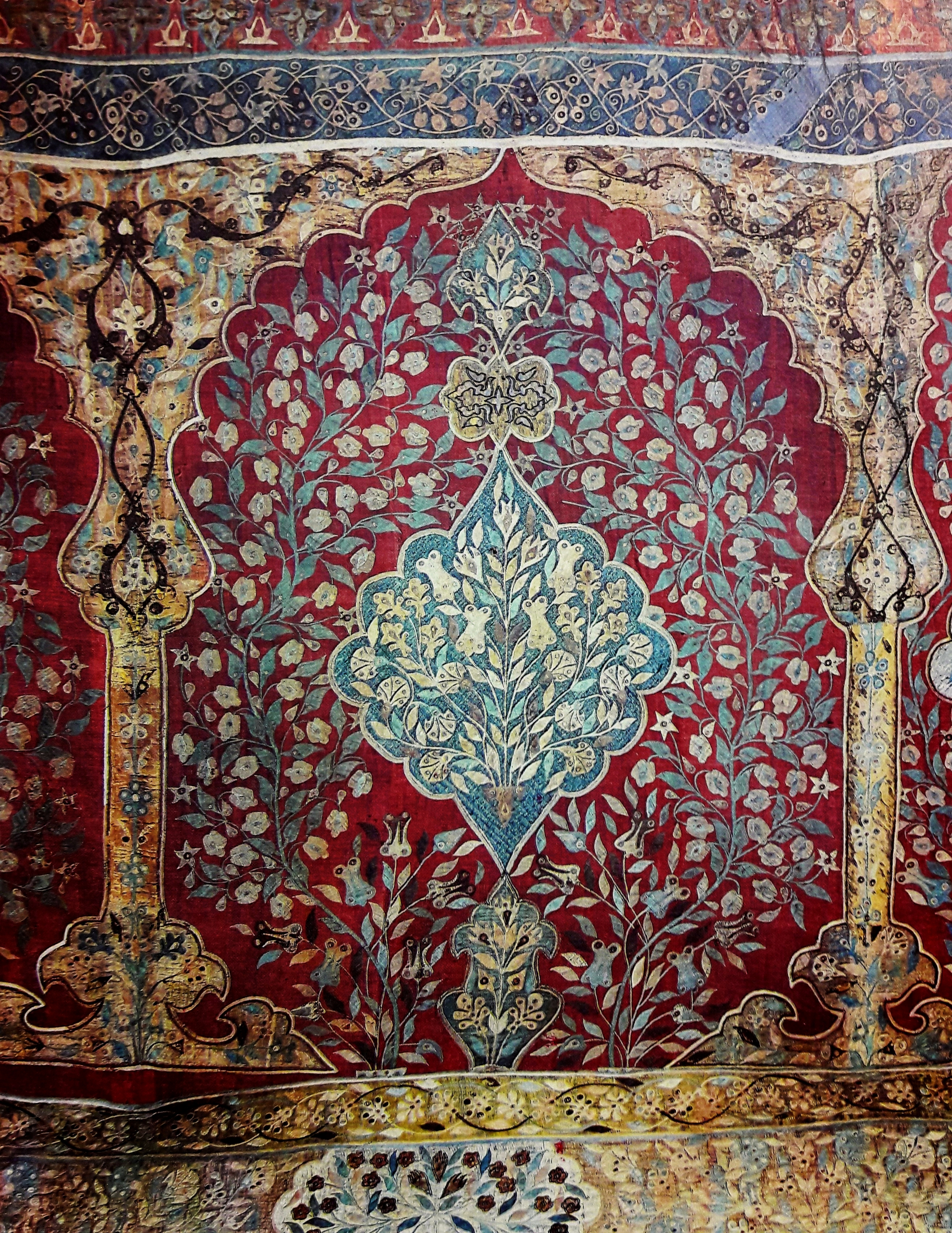
Appliqué decoration in a 17th-century Ottoman tent, now housed at the Dresden Armory in Germany

Appliqué was the most common technique used to decorate tent interiors during the early modern period but embroidery became popular in tent decoration later, especially during the 18th and 19th centuries. Embroidery allowed for more variation in color and form, which led to more intricate details and naturalistic rendering of motifs, which reflected the courtly tastes of the period. Both appliquéd and embroidered imagery included representations of permanent architectural elements such as archways as well as floral motifs and şemse (solar medallions).

== Furnishings ==
The interior of the tents would be furnished and organized for events that were taking place. During peacetime, the interior would be made to bring comfort to those who used them. Many different types of soft furnishings were used, such as carpets or rugs, pillows, and curtains or drapes. Rush mats were placed down first before carpets or other fabric floor coverings, which helped keep them clean. Interior furnishings and added elements would be arranged and selected to suit the event.

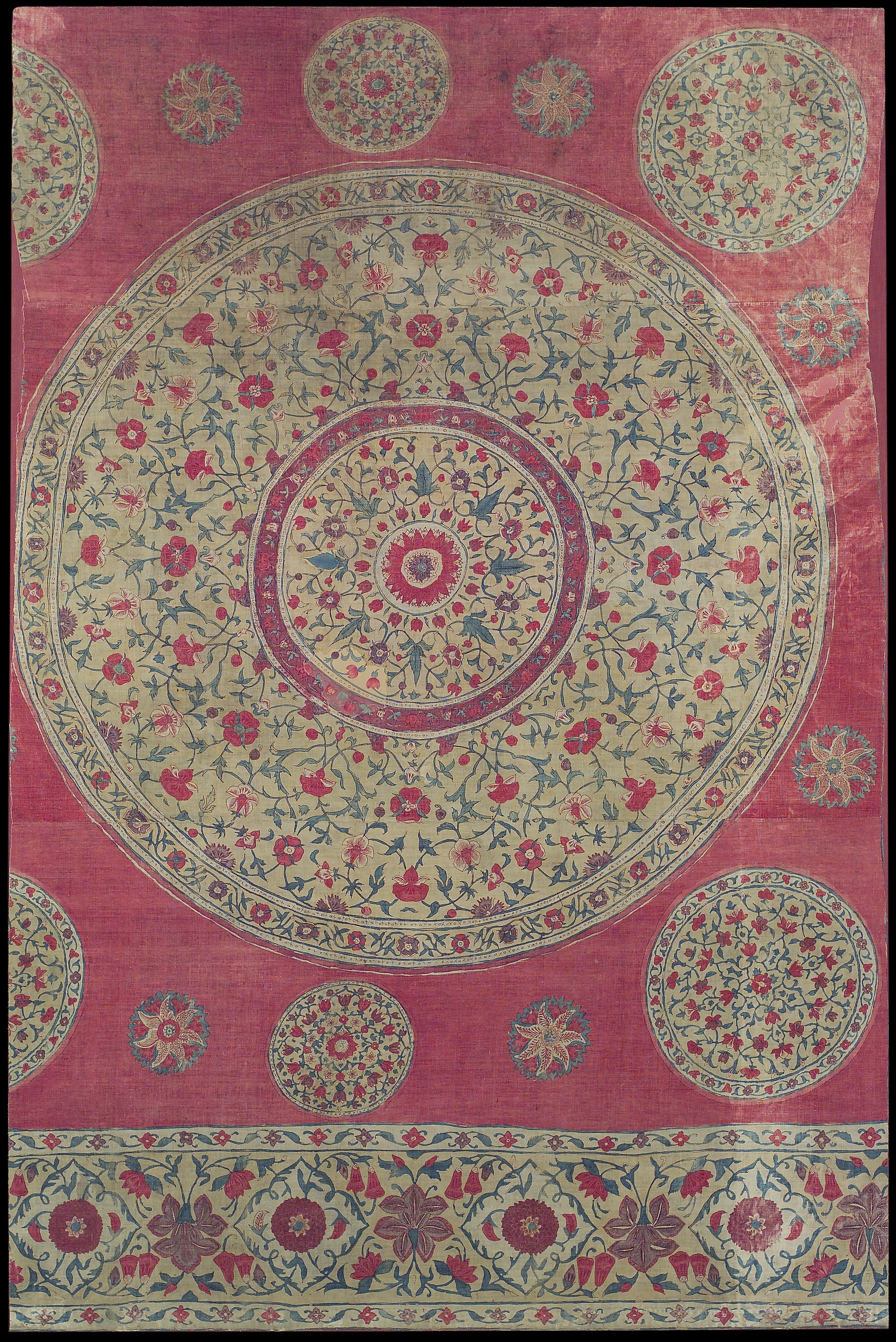
Block-printed decoration of a tent panel from Ottoman Bulgaria, likely produced in Deccan India c. 1700-1740 for export to the Ottoman Empire.
