= Staatliche Kunstsammlungen Dresden =

Network of museums in Dresden, Germany

Coordinates: 51°03′10″N 13°44′13″E

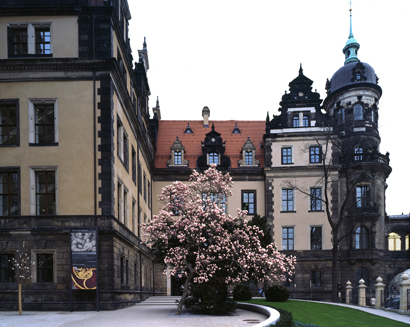
- Dresden Castle
- Location: Dresden, Germany
- Website: www.skd.museum/en/

Staatliche Kunstsammlungen Dresden (German: [ˈʃtaːtlɪçə ˈkʊnstˌzamlʊŋən ˈdʁeːzdən], 'Dresden State Art Collections'; abbreviated SKD) is a cultural institution in Dresden, Germany, owned by the State of Saxony. It is one of the most renowned and oldest museum institutions in the world, originating from the collections of the Saxon electors in the 16th century.

Today, the Dresden State Art Collections consists of fifteen museums. Most of them are located in the Dresden Castle, the Zwinger and the Albertinum.

== History ==
The museums belonging to the Staatliche Kunstsammlungen Dresden originated from the collections of the Saxon electors, several of whom were also Kings of Poland. Historical sources show that August I, Elector of Saxony, founded the electoral Kunstkammer (literally "art chamber") in 1560, a collection of art located in the Dresden Castle. He was influenced by the writings of Agricola on collecting. August the Strong and his son, August III, Kings of Poland, were important patrons and remarkable connoisseurs of the arts. They developed their art collections in a systematic fashion; in the process, they not only provided a foundation of extraordinary masterpieces for the Staatliche Kunstsammlungen Dresden, but also made these works accessible to select circles in their own time.

The Staatliche Kunstsammlungen has been a state-owned enterprise since January 1, 2009. The association includes twelve museums which operate independently within the context of their own collection, but all share various institutions and facilities as well as a central administration.

== Museums ==
Twelve museums belong to the Staatliche Kunstsammlungen Dresden.

=== Painting galleries ===
- Gemäldegalerie Alte Meister (Old Masters Painting Gallery), Zwinger
- Galerie Neue Meister (New Masters Gallery), Albertinum
- Kupferstich-Kabinett (Collection of Prints, Drawings and Photographs), Dresden Castle

=== Art museums ===
- Grünes Gewölbe (Green Vault) with the Historic and the New Green Vault, Dresden Castle
- Mathematisch-Physikalischer Salon (Royal Cabinet of Mathematical and Physical Instruments), Zwinger (west wing)
- Rüstkammer (Armory) with the Turkish Chamber, Dresden Castle
- Porzellansammlung (Porcelain Collection), Zwinger (Glockenspielpavillon)
- Münzkabinett (Numismatic Cabinet or Coin Cabinet), Dresden Castle
- Skulpturensammlung (Sculpture Collection), Albertinum
- Kunstgewerbemuseum (Arts and Crafts Museum), Pillnitz Castle
- Archiv der Avantgarden-Egidio Marzona, Blockhaus

=== Ethnographic museums ===
- State Ethnographical Collections with the Dresden Museum of Ethnology in the Japanese Palace, the Leipzig Museum of Ethnography and the Museum of Ethnography Herrnhut
- Museum für Sächsische Volkskunst and Puppentheatersammlung (Saxon Folk Art Museum and Puppet Theatre Collection), Jägerhof

Further institutions, such as the Kunstbibliothek (Art Library), the Kunstfonds (Art Fund) and the Gerhard Richter Archiv (Gerhard Richter Archive) also belong to the Staatliche Kunstsammlungen Dresden.

== Directors ==
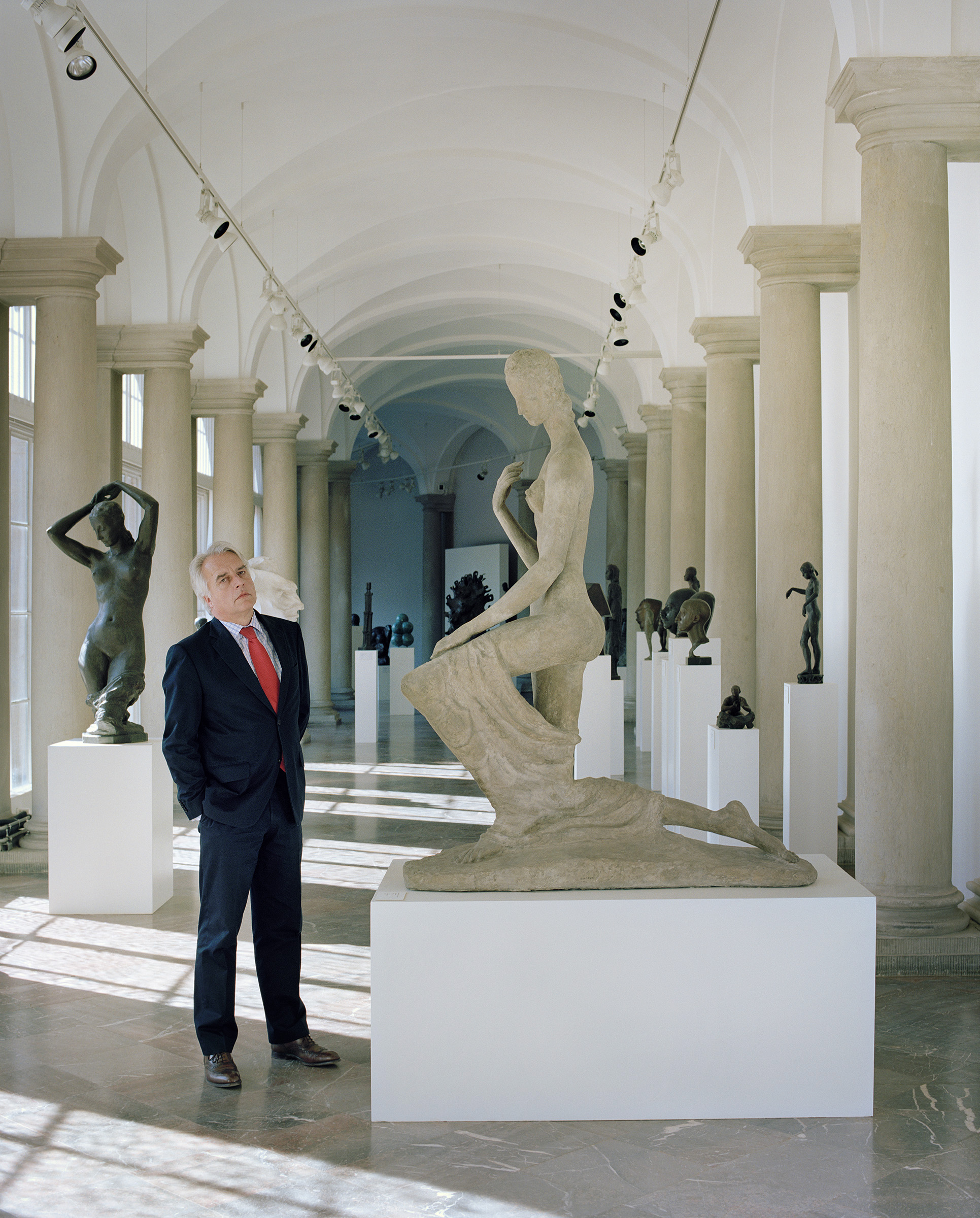
Former General Director Martin Roth photographed by Oliver Mark in front of Wilhelm Lehmbruck's 1911 figure The Kneeling Woman (2008)

- 1882-1910: Karl Woermann
- 1910-1942: Hans Posse (from 1933 also for the Führermuseum)
- 1943-1945: Herman Voss (Hans Posse's successor)
- 1944-1945: As WWII fighting instensified around Dresden, works were moved in groups to safe locations west of the Elba. A group of 174 pictures were destroyed by fire in the courtyard of Dresden Castle 13–14 February 1945. After the end of the war, in July 1945, recovered works were sent to Moscow and in February and March 1946 to Kyiv. Only German works of 19th-20th centuries and the collection of the Kupferstich-Kabinett remained behind.
- 1946-1951: Wolfgang Balzer (curator of German works and works on paper).
- 1955–1968: Max Seydewitz The return of works from the Soviet Union in 1955–58 coincided with the production of a catalog of works (missing or not) by Henner Menz in 1963
- 1968–1989: Manfred Bachmann
- 1990–1997: Werner Schmidt
- 1998–2001: Sybille Ebert-Schifferer
- 2001–2011: Martin Roth
- 2012–March 2016: Hartwig Fischer
- November 2016–2025 Marion Ackermann
- since May 2025 Bernd Ebert

== Locations ==
The museums of the Staatliche Kunstsammlungen are housed in six buildings. With the exception of Pillnitz Castle, they are all located in the historic center of Dresden.

Dresden Castle houses the Historic Green Vault (Historisches Grüne Gewölbe) and the New Green Vault (Neues Grüne Gewölbe), the Numismatic Cabinet (Münzkabinett), the Collection of Prints, Drawings and Photographs (Kupferstich-Kabinett), and the Armory (Rüstkammer) with the Turkish Chamber (Türckische Cammer).

The Zwinger palace contains the Old Masters Picture Gallery (Gemäldegalerie Alte Meister), the Porcelain Collection (Porzellansammlung), and the Royal Cabinet of Mathematical and Physical Instruments (Mathematisch-Physikalischer Salon).

The Albertinum hosts the New Masters Gallery (Galerie Neue Meister) and the Sculpture Collection (Skulpturensammlung).

Pillnitz Castle houses the Arts and Crafts Museum (Kunstgewerbemuseum) and the Japanisches Palais the Ethnographical Museum Dresden (Museum für Völkerkunde). The Saxon Folk Art Museum and Puppet Theatre Collection (Museum für Sächsische Volkskunst and Puppentheatersammlung) can be found in the Jägerhof in Dresden-Neustadt.

== Current status ==
The Staatliche Kunstsammlungen Dresden is owned by the State of Saxony. It is a member of the Konferenz Nationaler Kultureinrichtungen, a union of more than twenty cultural institutions in the former East Germany.

== Provenance Research and Restitutions ==
In the museums of the Dresden State Art Collections, the provenances of all acquisitions of works of art since 1933 are systematically investigated as part of the "Daphne" research, recording and inventory project. In 2020, the SKD restituted three graphic works from the Kupferstich-Kabinett to the family of Carl Heumann (1886-1945). Other restitutions are planned, but due to the covid epidemic, the transfer of two watercolor drawings with religious motifs by Peter Fendi (1796-1842) and an oil study of a girl with a parrot by Jakob Gensler (1808-1848) to the descendants of the former owner living in the USA and Great Britain have been postponed.
