= Albertinum =

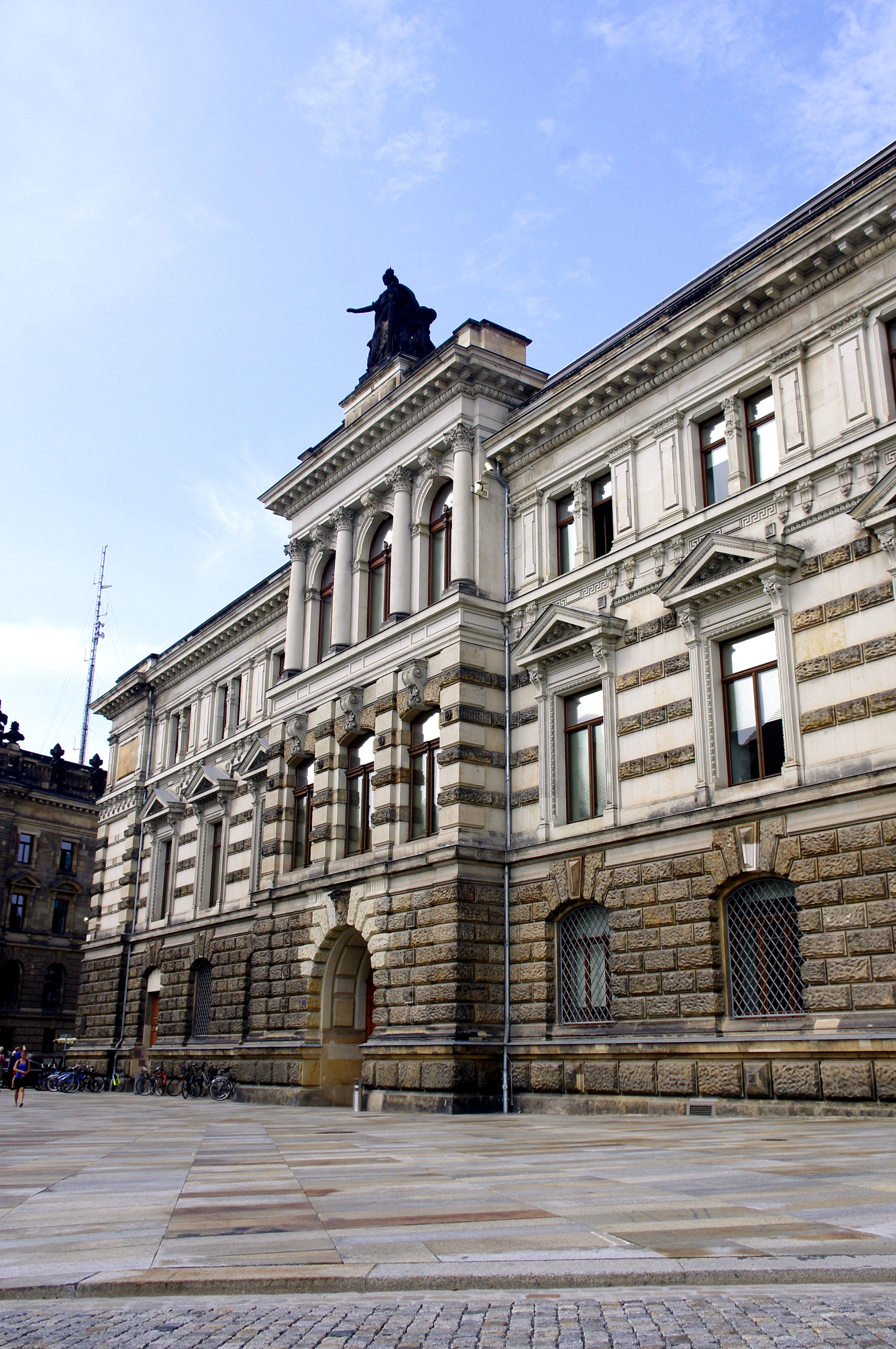
- Established: 1887
- Location: Georg-Treu-Platz 2, 01067 Dresden, Germany
- Coordinates: 51.051944°N 13.744444°E
- Type: Art museum, Historic site

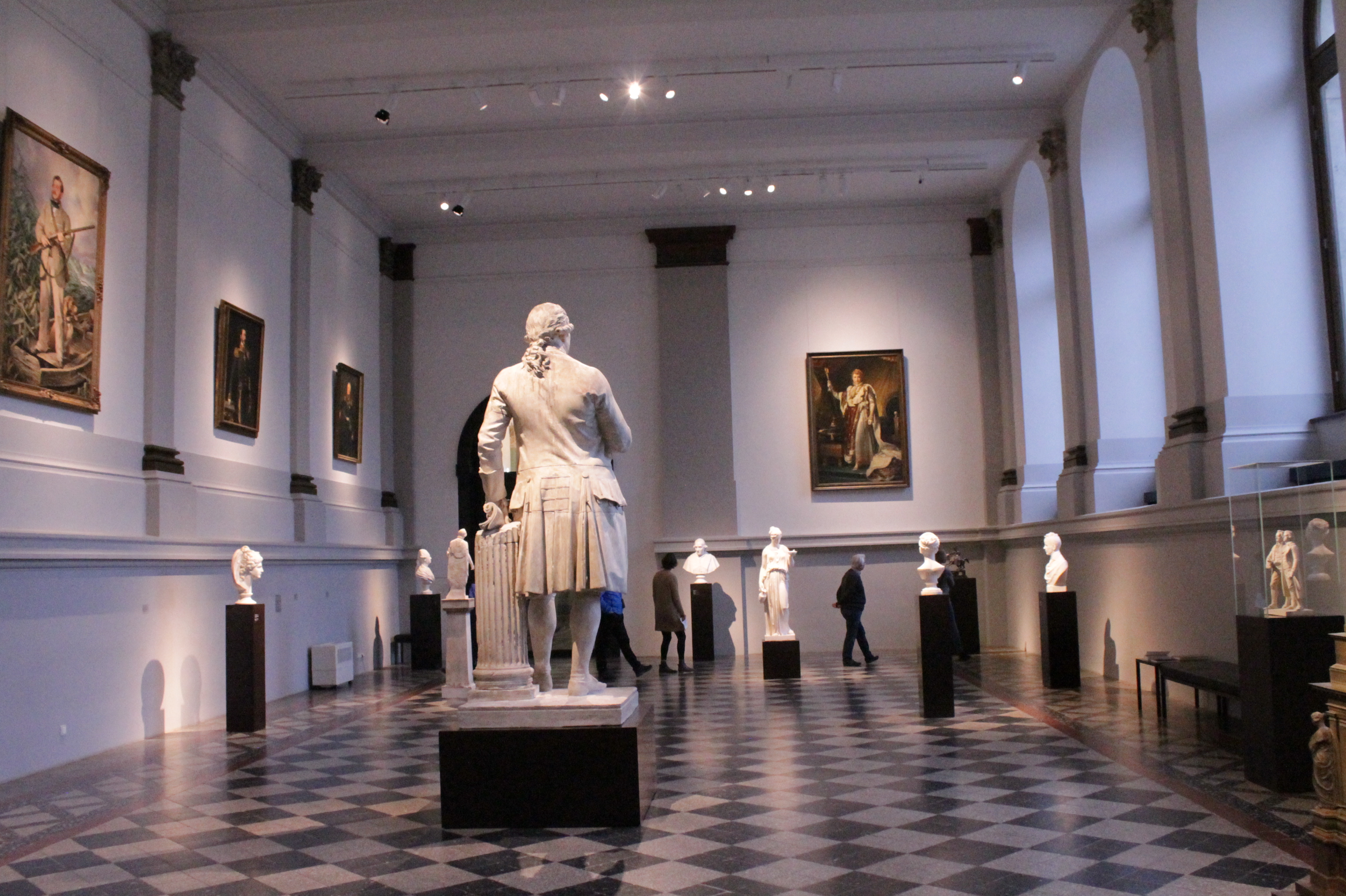
Upper sculpture hall, Albertinum, Dresden

The Albertinum (German pronunciation: [albɛʁˈtiːnʊm]) is a modern art museum. The sandstone-clad Renaissance Revival building is located on Brühl's Terrace in the historic center of Dresden, Germany. It is named after King Albert of Saxony.

The Albertinum hosts the New Masters Gallery (Galerie Neue Meister) and the Sculpture Collection (Skulpturensammlung) of the Dresden State Art Collections. The museum presents both paintings and sculptures from Romanticism to the present, covering a period of some 200 years.

== History ==
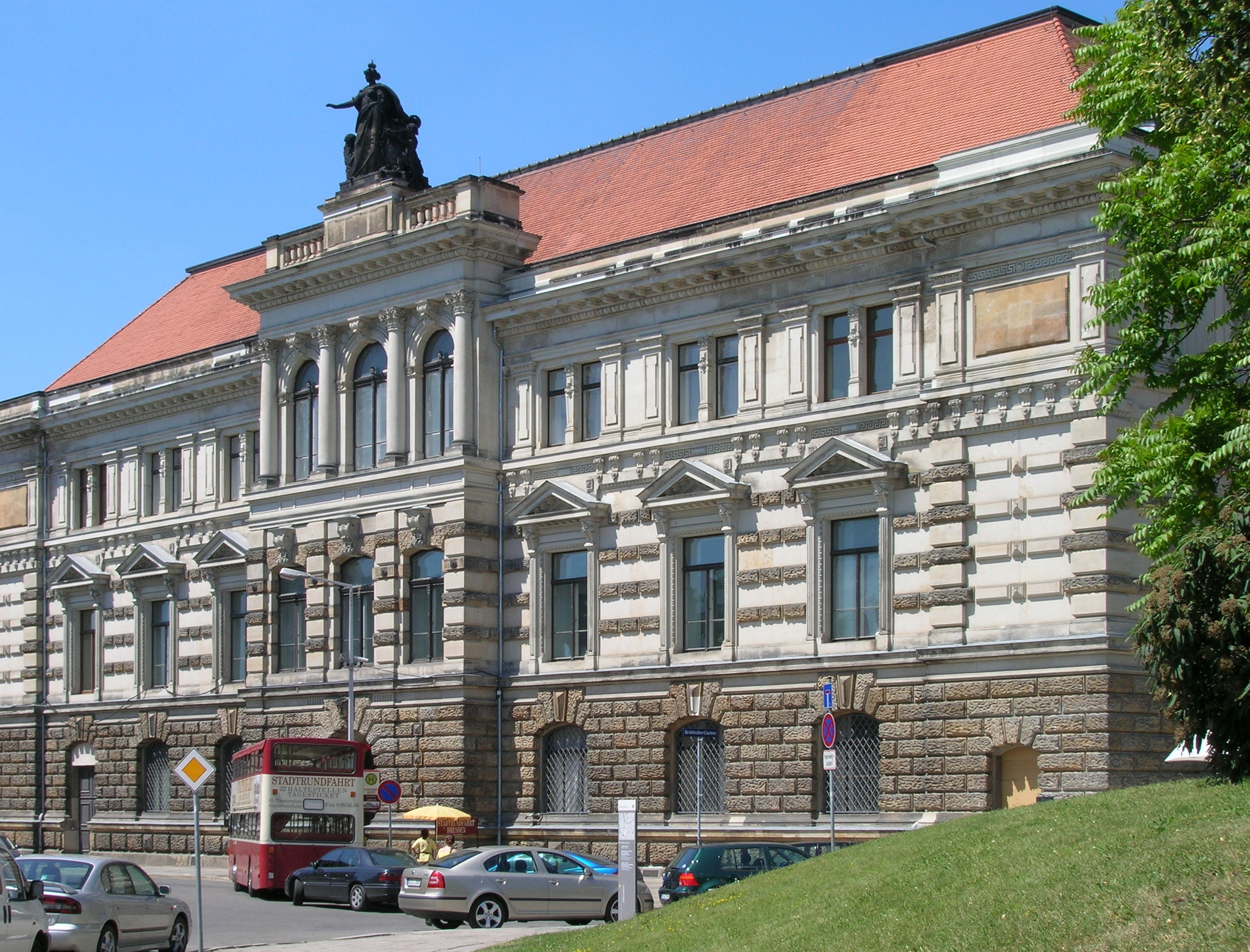
The eastside portal of the Albertinum

The Albertinum was built between 1884 and 1887 by extending a former armoury, or arsenal, that had been constructed between 1559 and 1563 at the same location. The new building was designed by the regional master builder Carl Adolf Canzler in the Renaissance Revival style to house the royal "Collection of Antique and Modern Sculptures". The building was named after the Saxonian King Albert who reigned at the time. In 1889, the Sculpture Collection was moved in and has since remained there.

Damaged in the 13 February 1945 bombing of Dresden in World War II, the Albertinum was restored by 1953.

Besides the Sculpture Collection, the Albertinum has housed the New Masters Gallery (Galerie Neue Meister) in the upper rooms since 1965. It was also the temporary postwar home of the Numismatic Cabinet (Münzkabinett) and the Green Vault (Grünes Gewölbe) until the exhibitions were moved to the rebuilt Dresden Castle in 2002 and 2004, respectively.

The floods of 2002 necessitated renovating the Albertinum and building a new flood-proof depository. After closing in 2006, the building was finally reopened on 20 June 2010 as a "house of the modern" with the New Masters Gallery and the Sculpture Collection, "designed for encounters between painting and sculpture, between the Romantic and the Modern". The most important improvement has been the roofing of the inner courtyard to form an atrium, called "an ark for the art". Furthermore, the glazed walling of the establishment's depositories gives visitors views of the inner workings of a museum.

== Museums ==
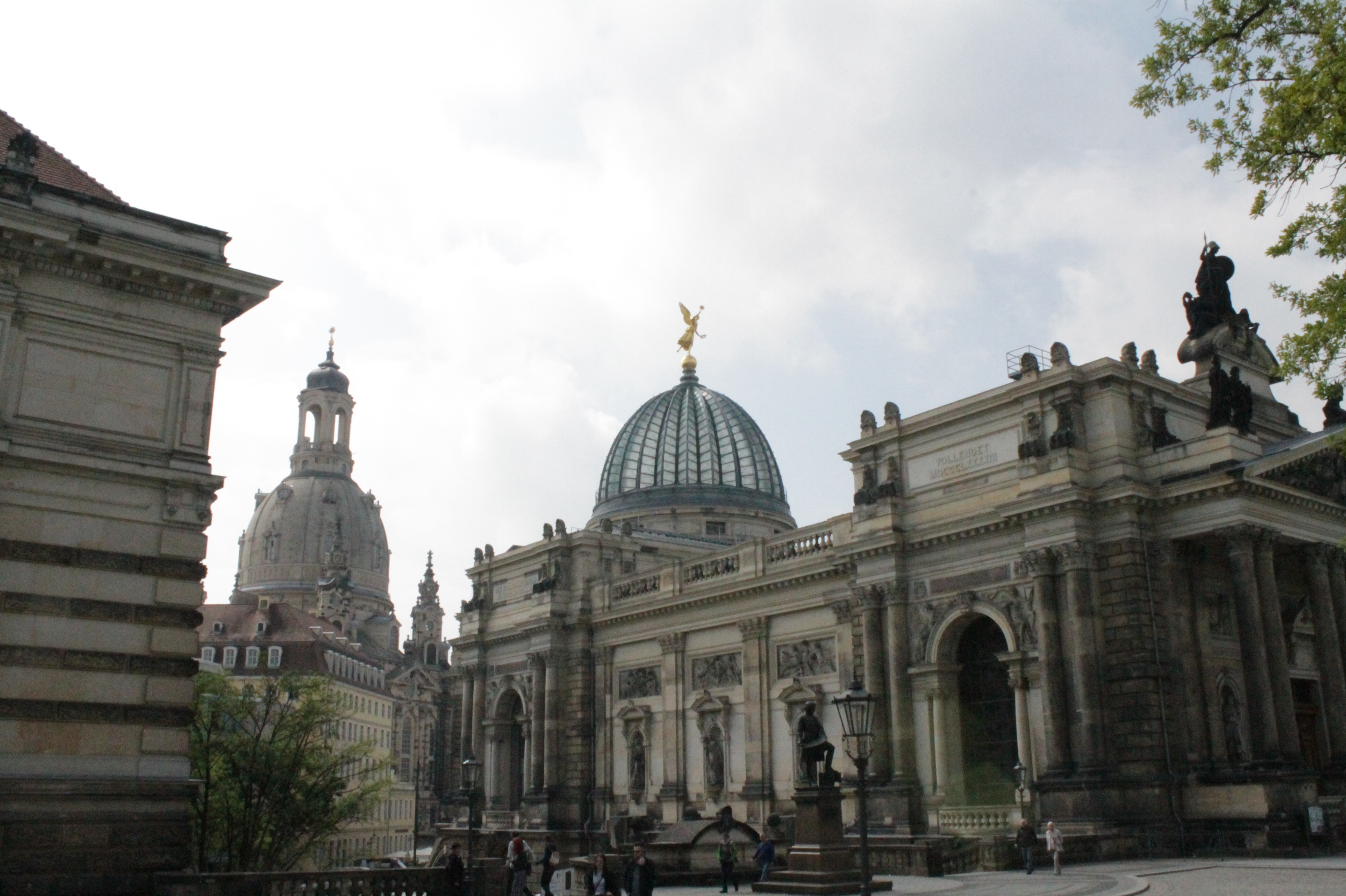
The Albertinum with Frauenkirche behind

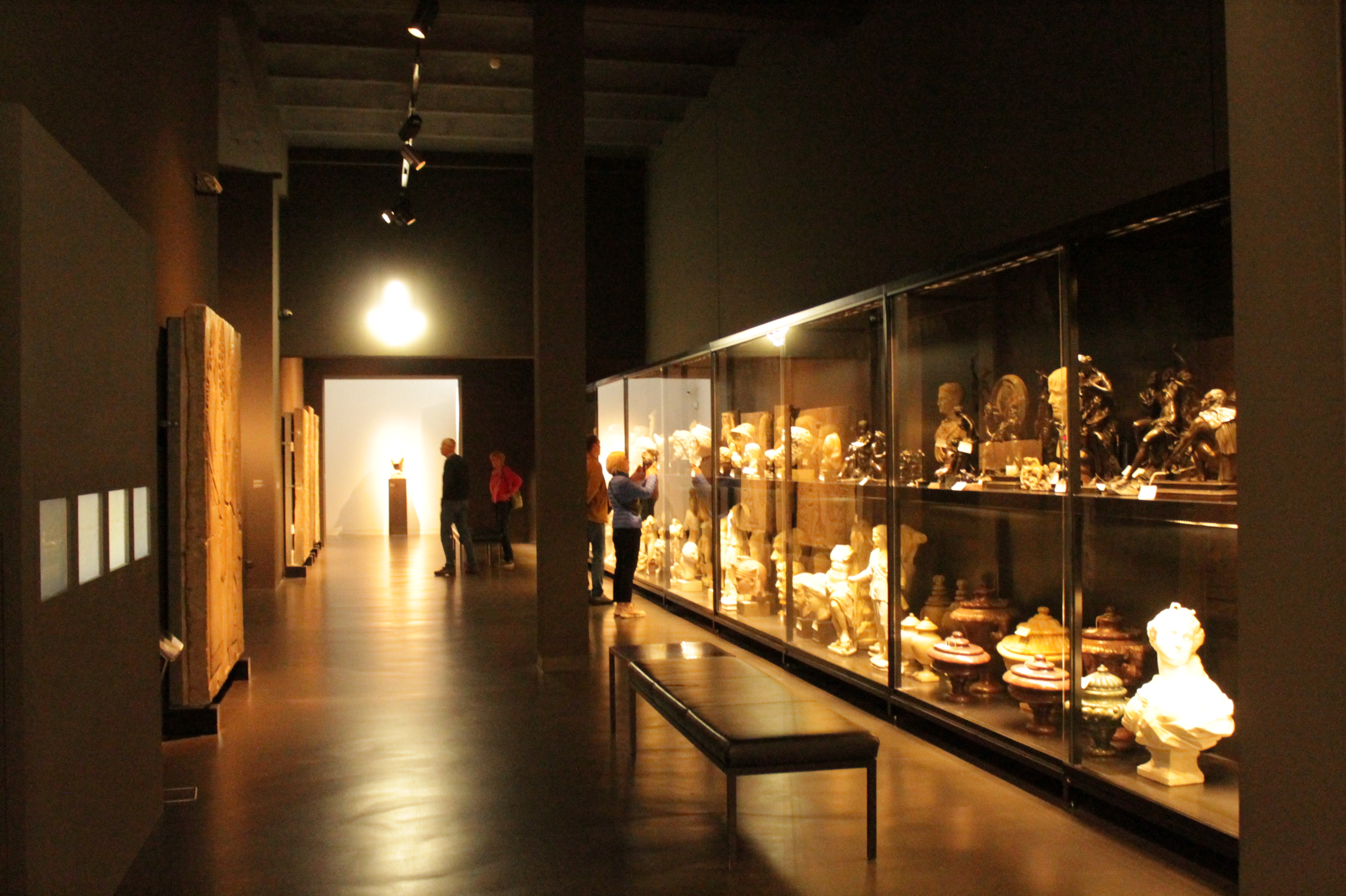
Sculpture corridor in the Albertinum in Dresden

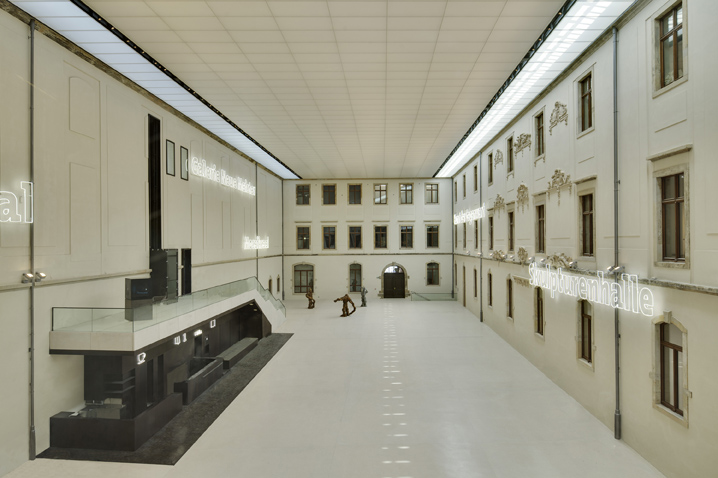
The central atrium of the Albertinum

The Albertinum houses the New Masters Gallery (Galerie Neue Meister) and the Sculpture Collection (Skulpturensammlung). The holdings of the two museums, with paintings ranging from Caspar David Friedrich to Ludwig Richter and sculptures from Auguste Rodin to the 21st century, are displayed on three floors in exhibition halls with a modern look.

== See also ==
- List of museums in Saxony
