= Kupferstich-Kabinett, Dresden =

Collection of prints of the Staatliche Kunstsammlungen Dresden

Adachi Museum of Art
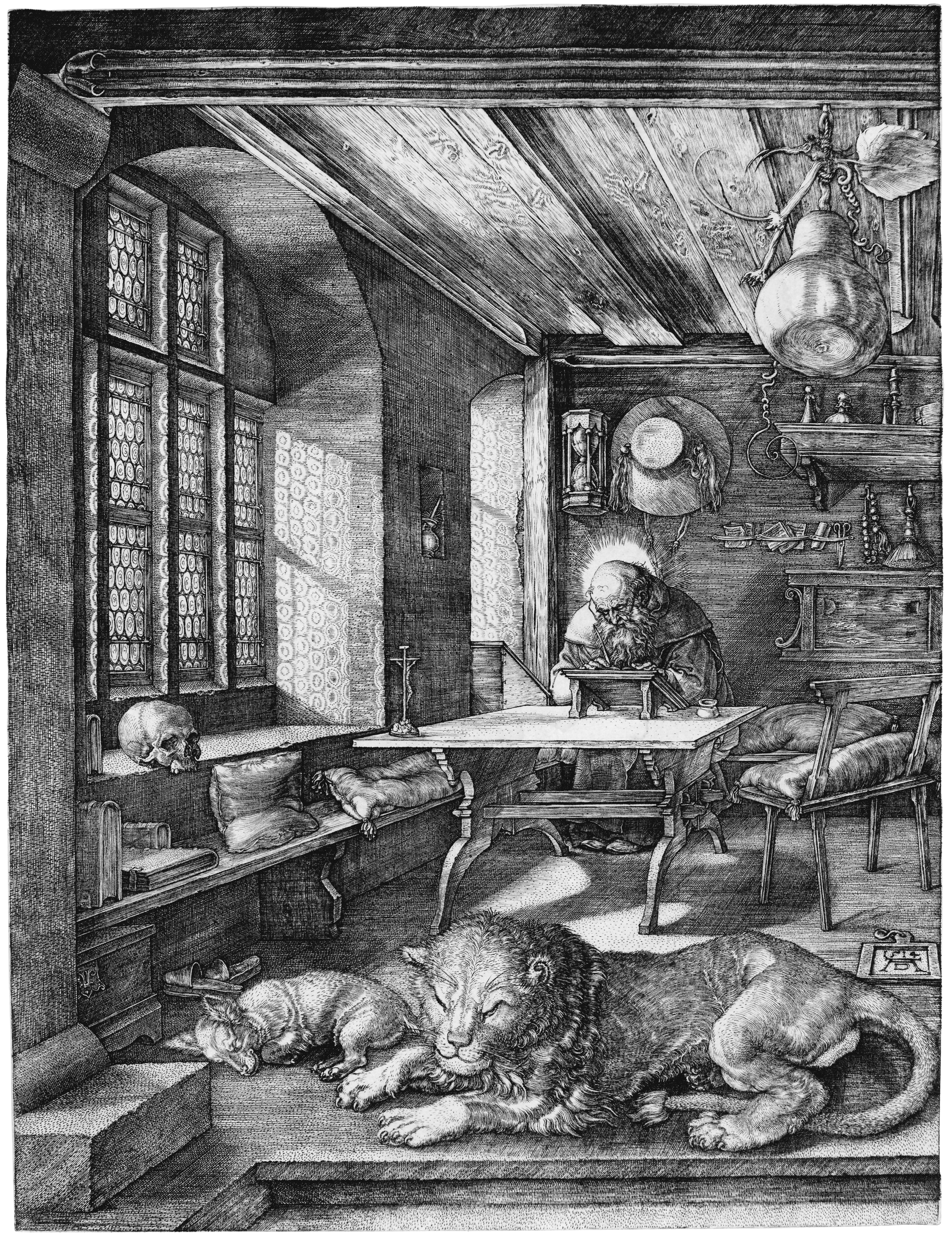
- Saint Jerome in His Study (Dürer)
- Interactive fullscreen map
- Location: Dresden
- Coordinates: 51°03′10″N 13°44′13″E

The Kupferstich-Kabinett (English: Collection of Prints, Drawings and Photographs) is part of the Staatliche Kunstsammlungen (State Art Collections) of Dresden, Germany. Since 2004 it has been located in Dresden Castle.

== History ==
Like many of Dresden's notable collections, this print room traces its origins to the Prince-electors of Saxony. The art chamber of the House of Wettin, established around 1560, became an independent museum of prints and drawings in 1720. The collection was expanded in the following centuries. It now describes itself as the oldest museum of graphic arts in the German-speaking world.

Because most items had been evacuated to Schloss Weesenstein in the early stages of World War II, the collection was saved from the bombing of Dresden in February 1945. War-time losses were still high; around 50,000 items are still missing. Most of the exhibits were looted by the Soviet Union after the war and did not return to Dresden until the late 1950s, and some when they were put back on display in the Albertinum.

== Collection ==
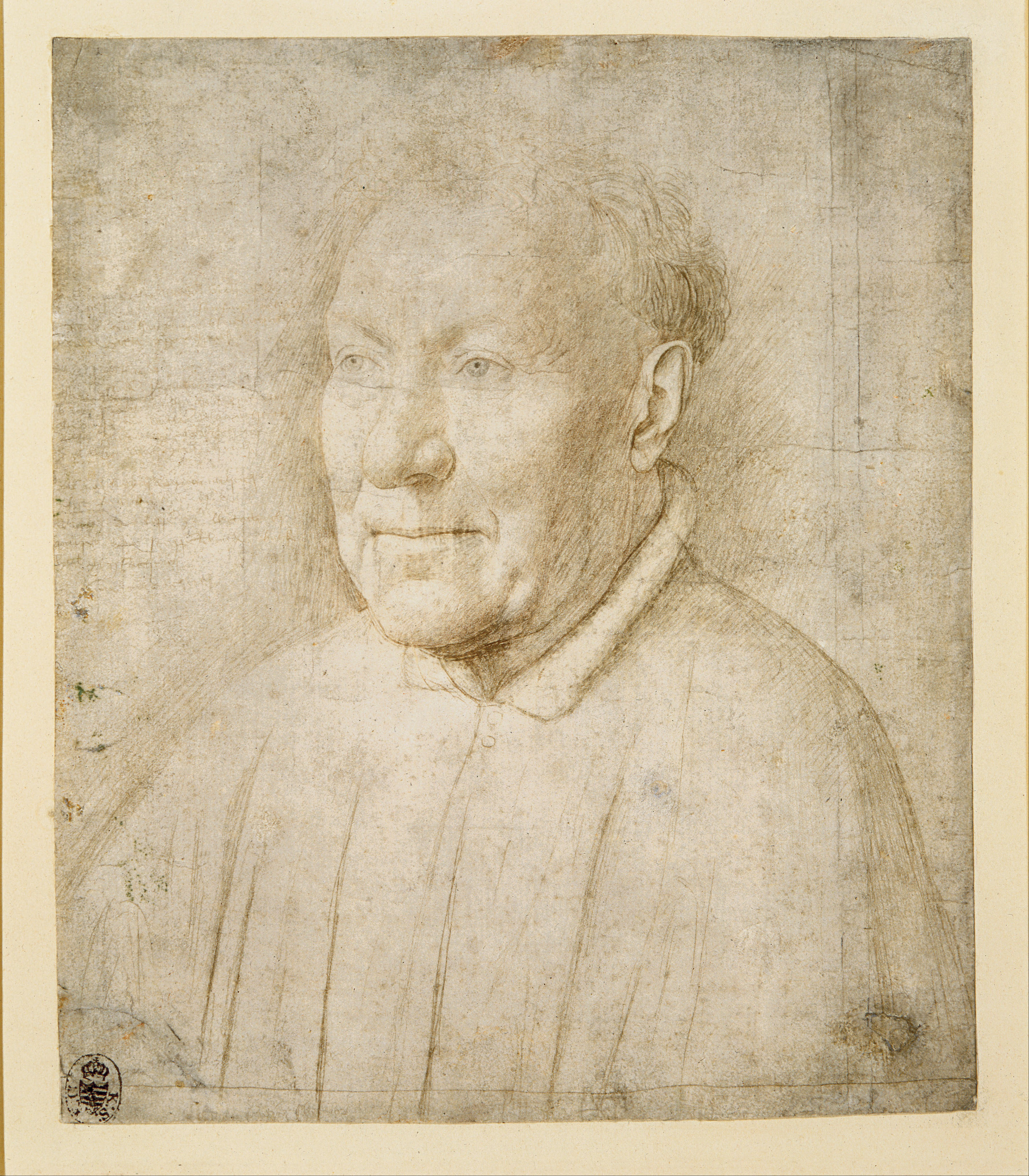
Study for Cardinal Niccolò Albergati, attributed to Jan van Eyck, c. 1431

The collection includes over 500,000 items, only a fraction of which can be exhibited. The most renowned artists in the collection include Lucas Cranach the Elder, Albrecht Dürer, Jan van Eyck, Francisco de Goya, Hans Holbein the Younger, Michelangelo, Rembrandt, and Rubens. There is also a large number of works by artists with strong connections to Dresden, such as Caspar David Friedrich, Ludwig Richter, Georg Baselitz and Johannes Heisig. The collection of Käthe Kollwitz was started in 1898 and now numbers over 200 works from her oeuvre of drawings and graphics.

Besides the permanent exhibition, the Kupferstich-Kabinett also hosts regular special exhibitions featuring both its own works and those on loan from other notable museums.

== Provenance research ==
The Kupferstich-Kabinett is one of several German museums that are researching the art collector Carl Heumann (1886–1945), who after building in the 1920s and 1930s an important collection of prints of German and Austrian art of the 18th and 19th centuries, was persecuted because of his Jewish origins under the National Socialist regime.The Kupferstich-Kabinett approached Carl Heumann's descendants in order to find a just and fair solution regarding the artworks from his collection.

== See also ==
List of museums in Saxony
