= Münzkabinett =

Museum in Dresden, Germany

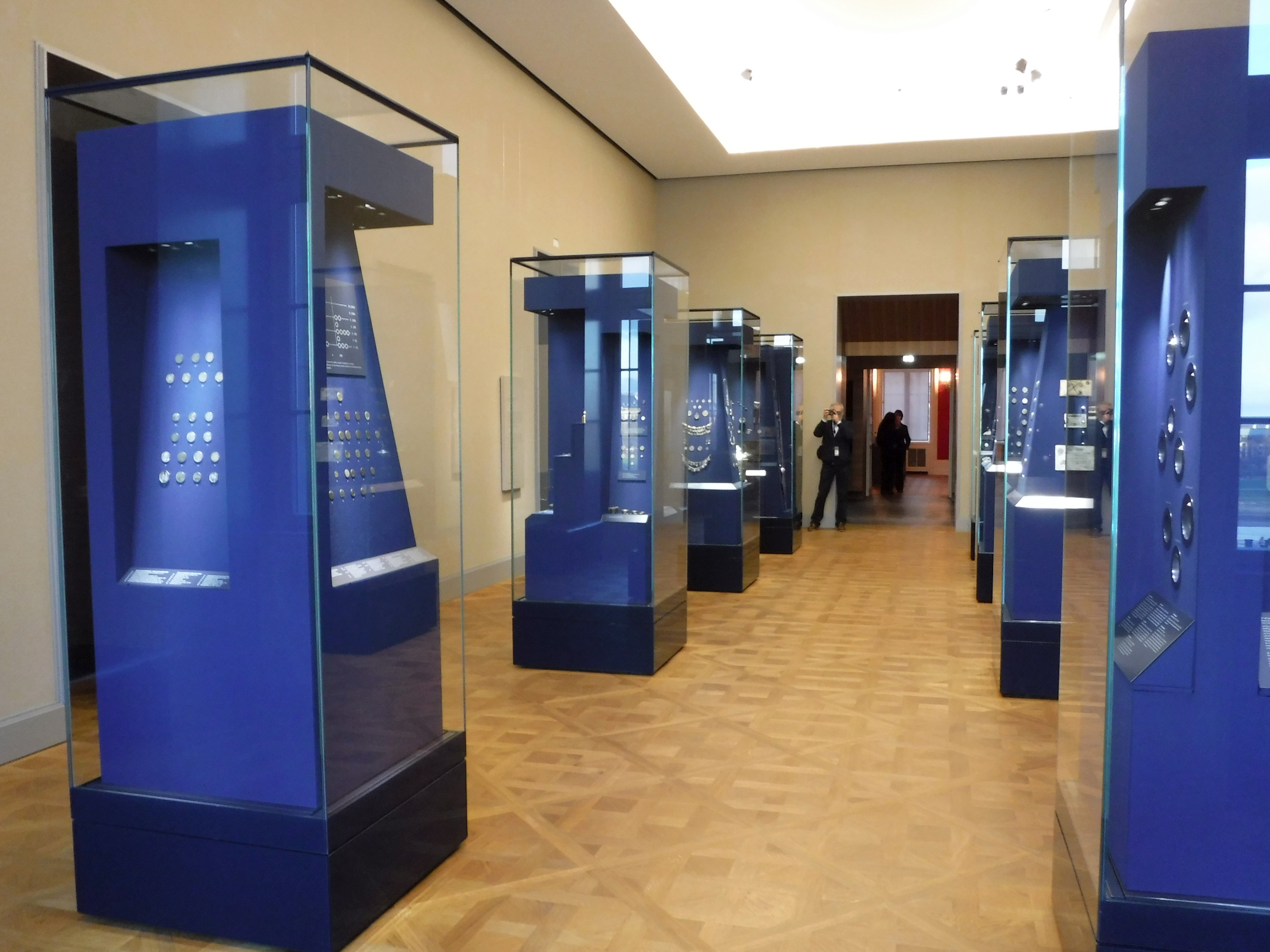
- One of the four exhibition rooms
- Interactive fullscreen map
- Location: Dresden, Germany
- Coordinates: 51°03′10″N 13°44′13″E

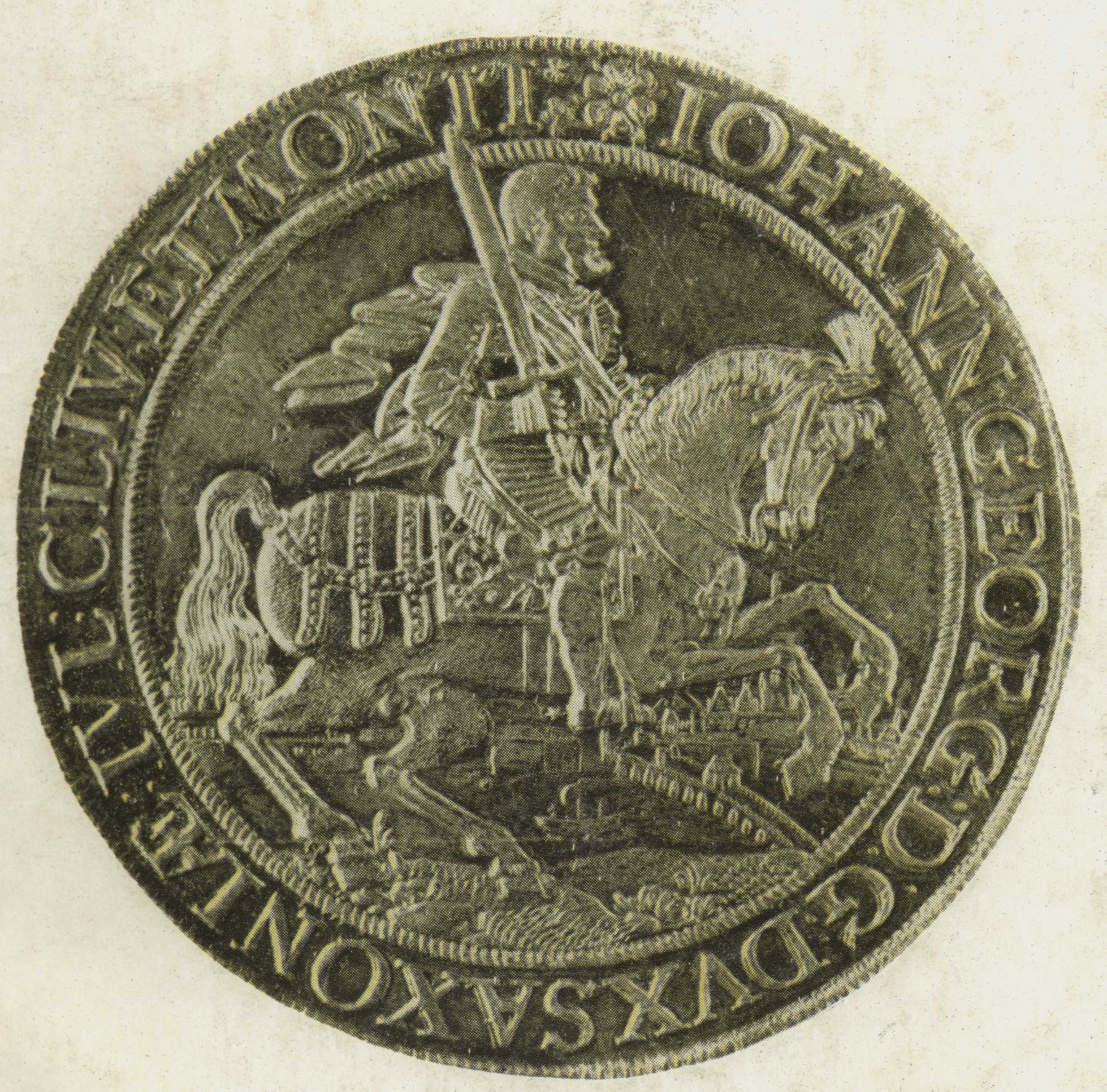
Coin of 1628 depicting John George I, Elector of Saxony and the Saxonian coat of arms

The Münzkabinett (English: Numismatic Cabinet) is part of the Staatliche Kunstsammlungen Dresden (Dresden State Art Collections). Founded around 1530, it is one of the oldest museums in Dresden. It is located in Dresden Castle.

The Münzkabinett is one of the three largest numismatic collections in Germany. Its nearly 300,000 objects include coins from most countries of the world from antiquity to present day, historic and modern medallions, medals and insignia, historic bank notes and bonds, minting dies for coins and medals, seals, models, early forms of money, and minting machines and equipment. The Münzkabinett is a Landesmünzkabinett or official state collection, and has claim to any hoards of coins found on Saxon territory.

The Münzkabinett is also a center of scholarly research and has a public library of some 30,000 volumes.

== History ==
The Münzkabinett is one of Dresden’s oldest museums, dating back to the time of Duke George the Bearded (1500–1539). Over the centuries the collection has expanded through the constant acquisition of items by the Electors and Kings of Saxony. At the turn of the 18th century, the Dresden Münzkabinett was already a famous coin collection in Europe. The collection became a universal one during the Baroque period. Beginning in the second half of the 18th century, the Münzkabinett also developed into an important German center of scholarly research.

The collection was kept in Dresden Castle until 1743, when it was moved to the Taschenbergpalais. In 1786, it was transferred to the Japanisches Palais by Augustus III, the son of Augustus II the Strong, along with the library and the collection of antiquities. In 1877, the Münzkabinett was moved back to the Dresden Castle. From 1911 until 1945, it was housed in the Chancellery Building, near the Stallhof yard.

At the end of the war in 1945, the collection was confiscated by the Red Army and taken to the Soviet Union. It was returned to Dresden in 1958, but without the books and magazines which had also been taken. From 1959 until 2002, a selection of coins and medals was on view in the Albertinum.

In the summer of 2002, the Münzkabinett finally moved to its place of origin, the Georgenbau of Dresden Castle. Until the permanent exhibition was installed in June 2015, the museum had been holding a series of temporary exhibitions in the Hausmannsturm (Hausmann Tower).

== Exhibition and Library ==
The Münzkabinett exhibition shows around 3,300 objects, including rare and unique items, which represent a cross-section of the various parts of the collection. They are presented in four chapters (rooms). For research work, the collection has a library of some 30,000 volumes. The library and a study room are open to the public.

== See also ==
- List of museums in Saxony
