= Dresden Armoury =

Museum in Dresden, Germany

Dresden Armory
- Rüstkammer
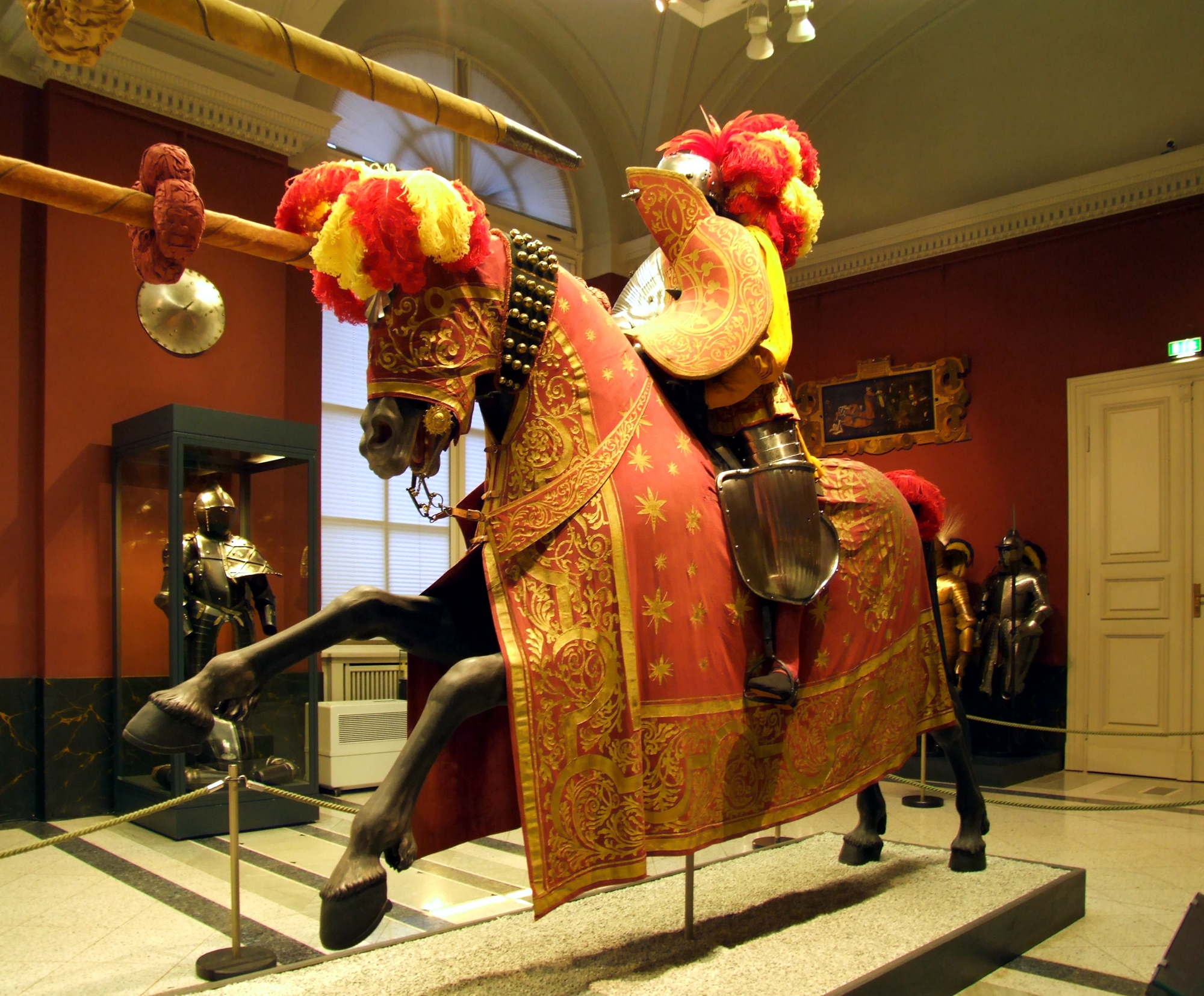
- The Armoury in Dresden Castle
- Interactive fullscreen map
- Established: 2nd half of the 16th century
- Location: Dresden Castle, Dresden, Germany
- Type: Historical, military
- Director: Dirk Syndram
- Website: ruestkammer.skd.museum/en

The Dresden Armoury or Dresden Armory (German: Rüstkammer), also known as the Dresden Historical Museum (German: Historisches Museum Dresden), is one of the world's largest collections of ceremonial weapons, armour and historical textiles. It is part of the Dresden State Art Collections and is located in Dresden Castle in Dresden.

The Turkish Chamber (German: Türkische Kammer) is a separate collection within the Dresden Armoury that is focused on art from the Ottoman Empire.

== History ==
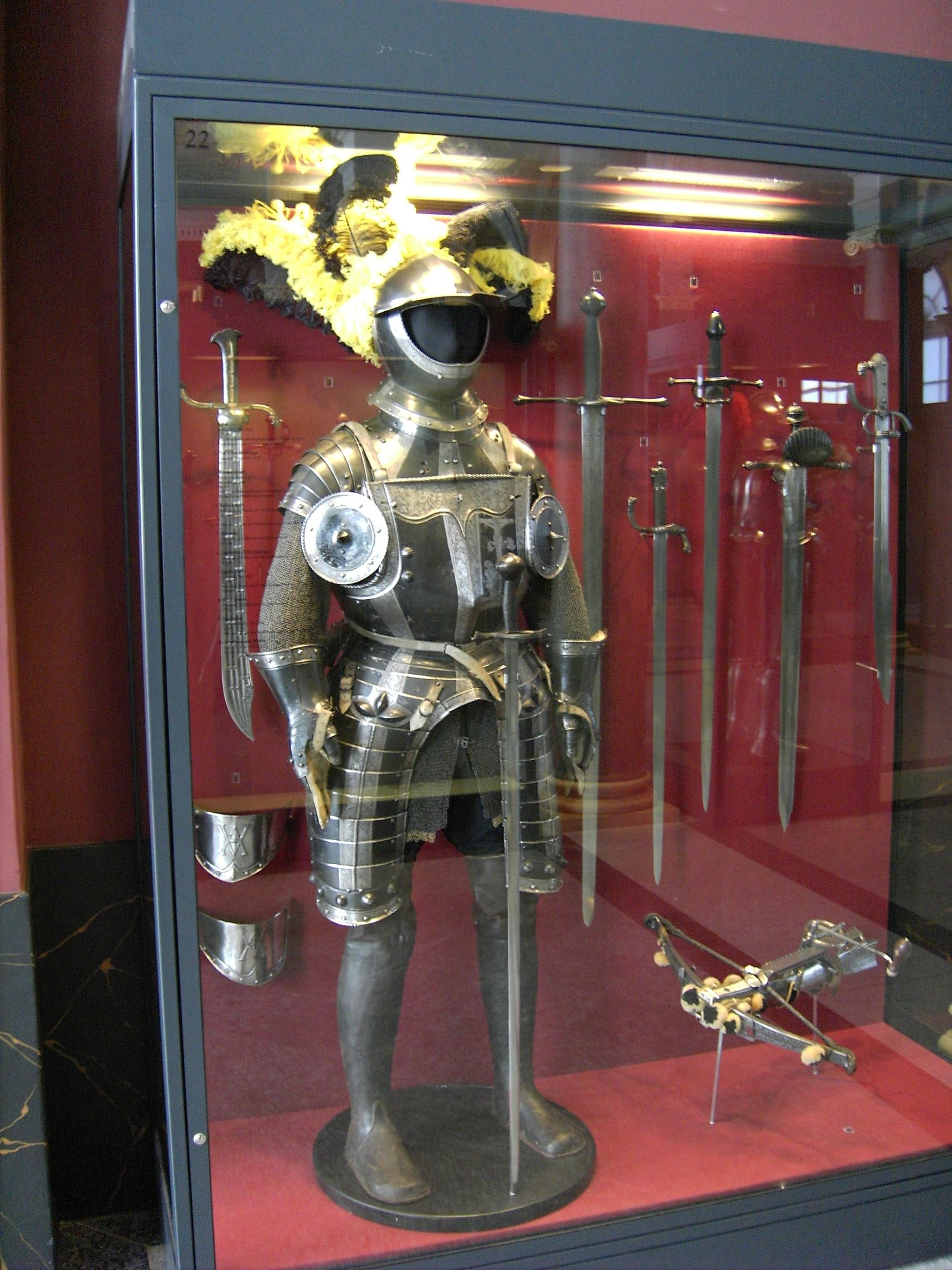
The Armoury in Dresden Castle

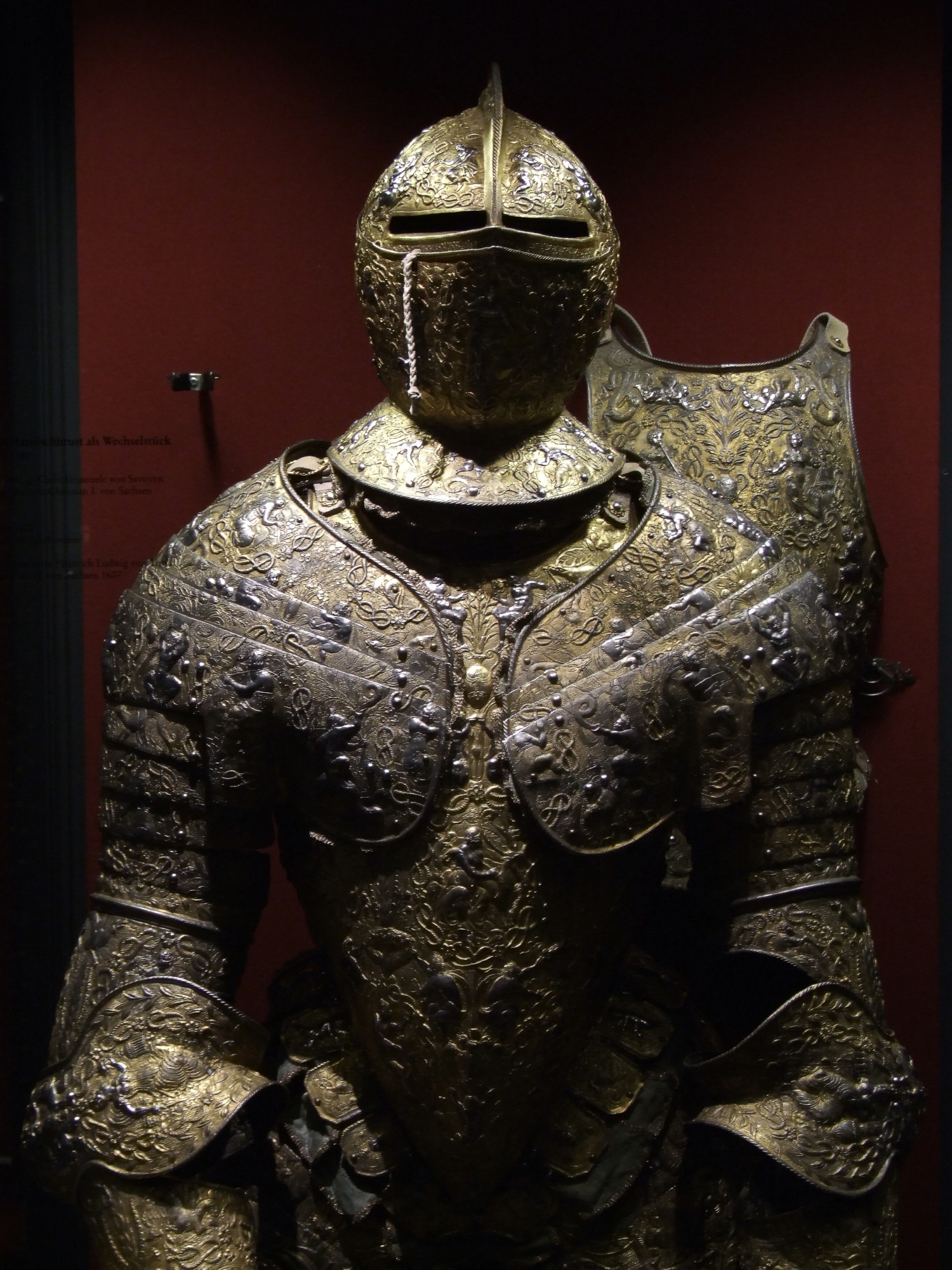
Suit of armour from the mid-16th century

The oldest weapons collection in Dresden, the City Armoury (Städtische Harnischkammer) was founded in 1409, containing the weapons used by the citizens to defend the city. It existed until the 17th century when it became obsolete. Besides this, two further armouries were established shortly after. One was the Ducal Armoury (Herzogliche Harnischkammer), founded after Duke Albert was granted an independent dukedom in 1485. Housed in Dresden Castle, it contained the personal weapons of the ruling House of Wettin. Furthermore, Prince Elector Augustus founded the Arsenal of the Saxon State (Kurfürstliches Landeszeughaus) containing Saxony's weapons of war, such as cannons.

The Ducal Armoury (Herzogliche Harnischkammer) is the direct predecessor of today’s Rüstkammer. It was founded after Albert III, Duke of Saxony, ("Albert the Bold") established Meissen as the centre of Albertine Saxony and named himself Margrave of Meissen in 1485. A continuous growth in the collection of parade weapons occurred during the reign of his son, George, Duke of Saxony ("George the Bearded"), who named Dresden the capital of his realm. After George's grandson, Duke Maurice, gained the title of Saxon prince elector in 1547, the Ducal Armory was renamed Electoral Armory (Kurfürstliche Rüstkammer) and thus gained electoral status. It was located on the ground floor of the Hausmannsturm, the tower of Dresden Castle.

Prince Elector Augustus initiated the museum era of the armoury by taking an inventory of the electoral holdings. The inventory of 1567 mentions several buildings with holdings of the armoury, listing more than 1,500 weapons. Much of the armoury was displayed on carved wooden horses. The armoury moved into the newly-established Stable Building ("Stallgebäude", today’s Johanneum) in 1591, where it remained until 1722.

When Prince Elector Frederick Augustus I was made King of Poland in 1697, the armoury acquired royal status. Now named Augustus II ("Augustus II the Strong"), he faced increased needs for representation, leading to the establishment of his treasure chamber, the Green Vault. As a result, richly adorned weapons were moved into the new museums, spoiling the integrity of the armoury’s holdings. Furthermore, the armoury had to be moved again, this time into the Secret War Chancellery (Geheime Kriegskanzlei) where it was housed from 1722 until 1832. Nevertheless, the armoury remained a favourite among visitors at this time. The son of Augustus II the Strong, Augustus III, established the Firearms Gallery in the Long Corridor of the Stallhof (Stall Courtyard), which links the castle complex with the adjacent Johanneum. At the time, the Firearms Gallery was the most valuable of its kind in Germany; today, its more than 3,000 firearms are an important part of the Rüstkammer.

After the armoury was acquired by the state in 1831, it was renamed the Royal Historic Museum (Königliches Historisches Museum) and moved into the Zwinger building in 1832. It remained there until 1877, when it was moved again into the Johanneum. In 1913/14, the parade weapons which had been placed in the Green Vault, were reintegrated into the armory collection.

The artefacts from the Firearms Gallery and the Historic Museum were taken to Königstein Fortress during World War II. At the end of the war in 1945, the collections were confiscated by the Red Army and transported to Leningrad. Since their return to Dresden in 1958, part of the collection, now again named the Dresden Armoury (Rüstkammer), had been on display in the Semper Gallery of the Zwinger until September 2012. After completion of the Riesensaal in Dresden Castle in February 2013, the armoury's collection has been exhibited there.

== Exhibition ==
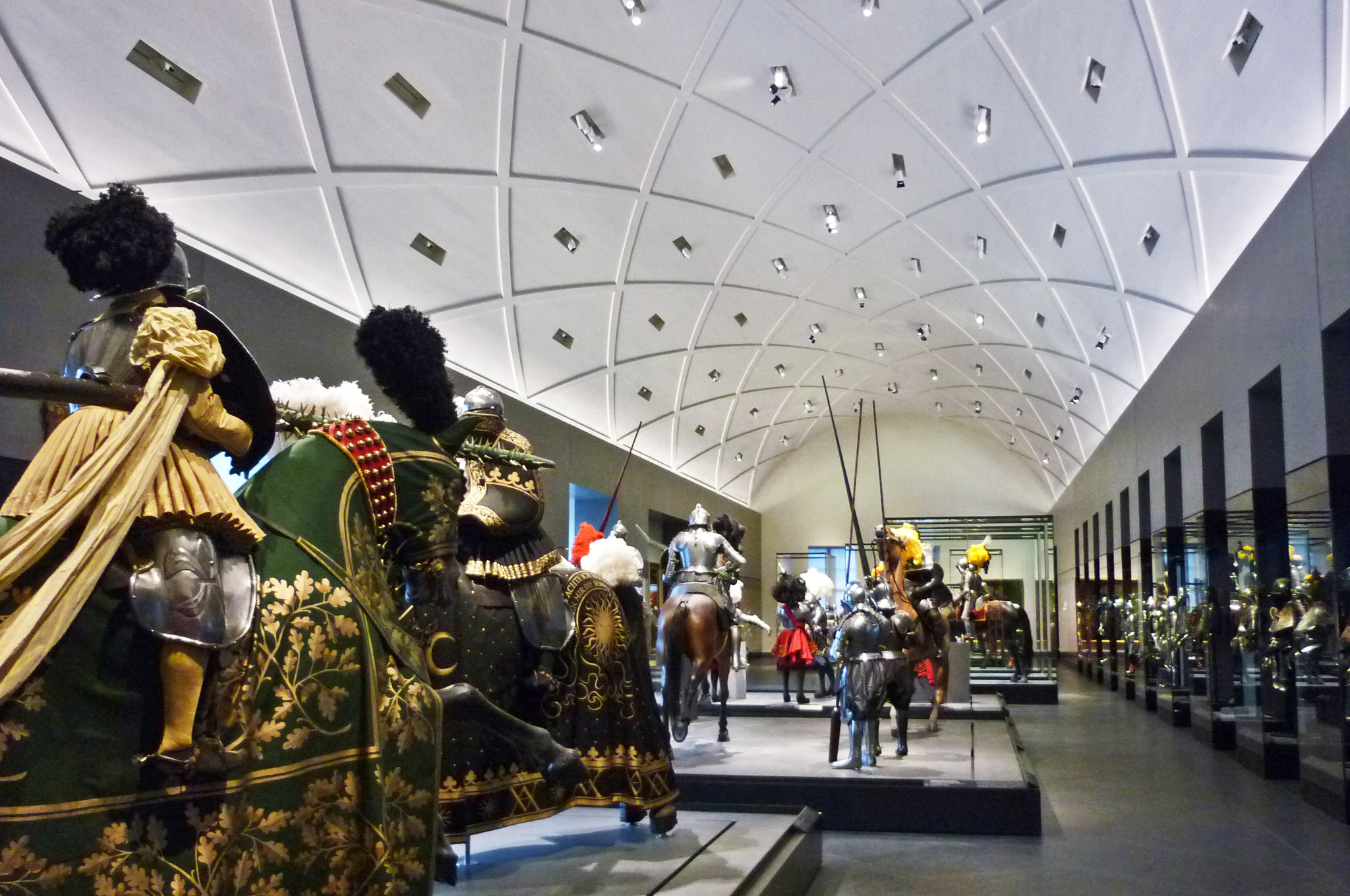
The Riesensaal (Giant's Hall) housing tournament equipment and personal armour

Today’s exhibition comprises around 1,300 artefacts, representing less than 10 percent of the entire holdings. They are arranged in 121 showcases and six pedestals. The exhibition is centred around knighthood. It includes parade and tournament weapons, firearms from the Firearms Gallery, racing and jousting equipment, and paintings of tournaments. Usually, the pieces shown were once in use by the Saxon Electors, his family and the court. The displayed items span three centuries, from the 15th to the 18th century.

== Turkish Chamber ==
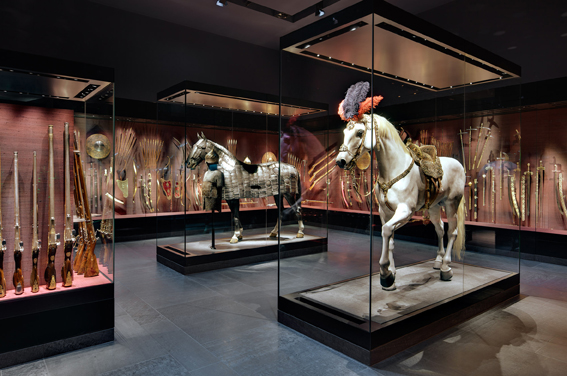
The Turkish Chamber

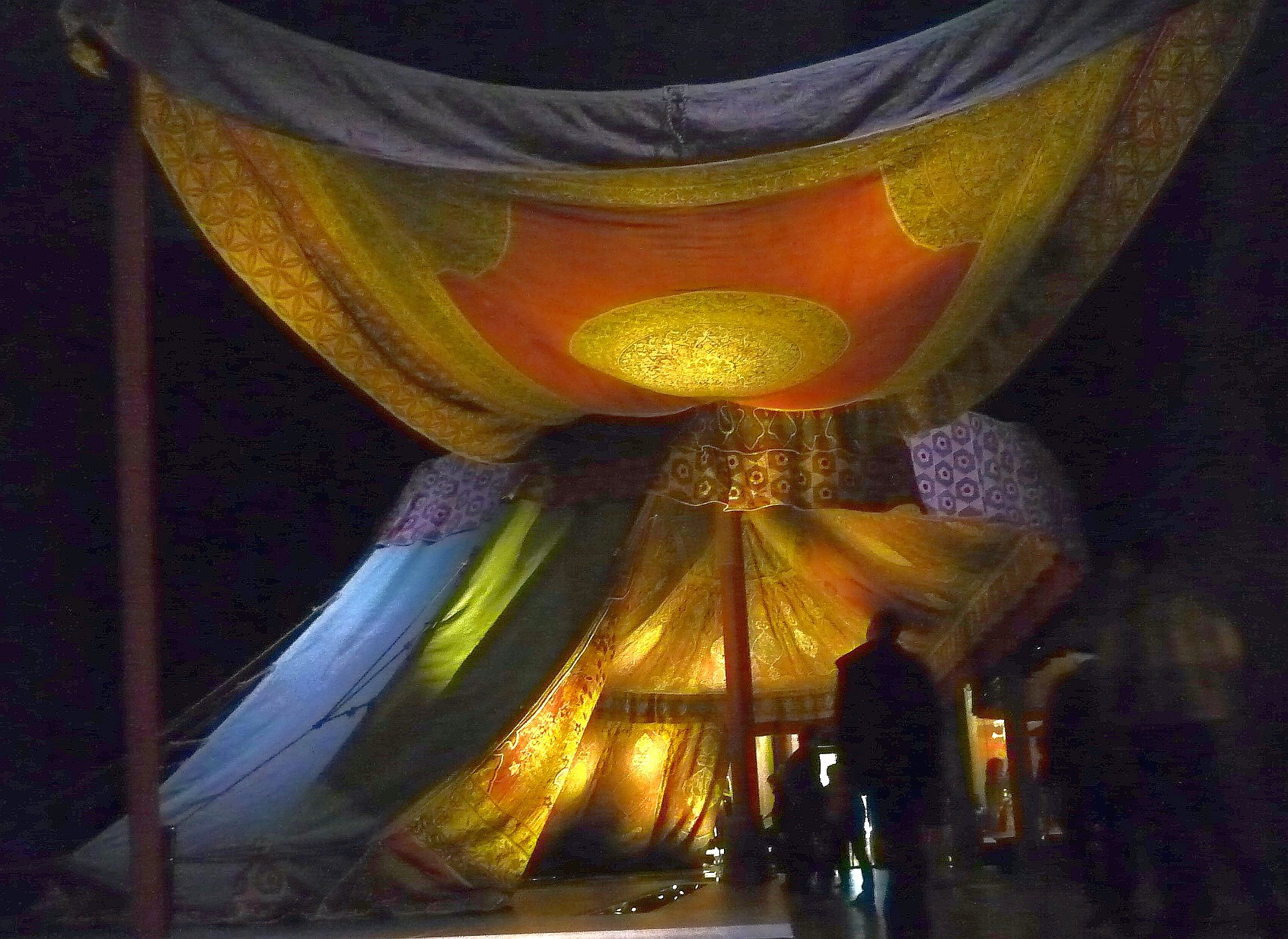
The three-mast tent, the largest object in the Turkish Chamber

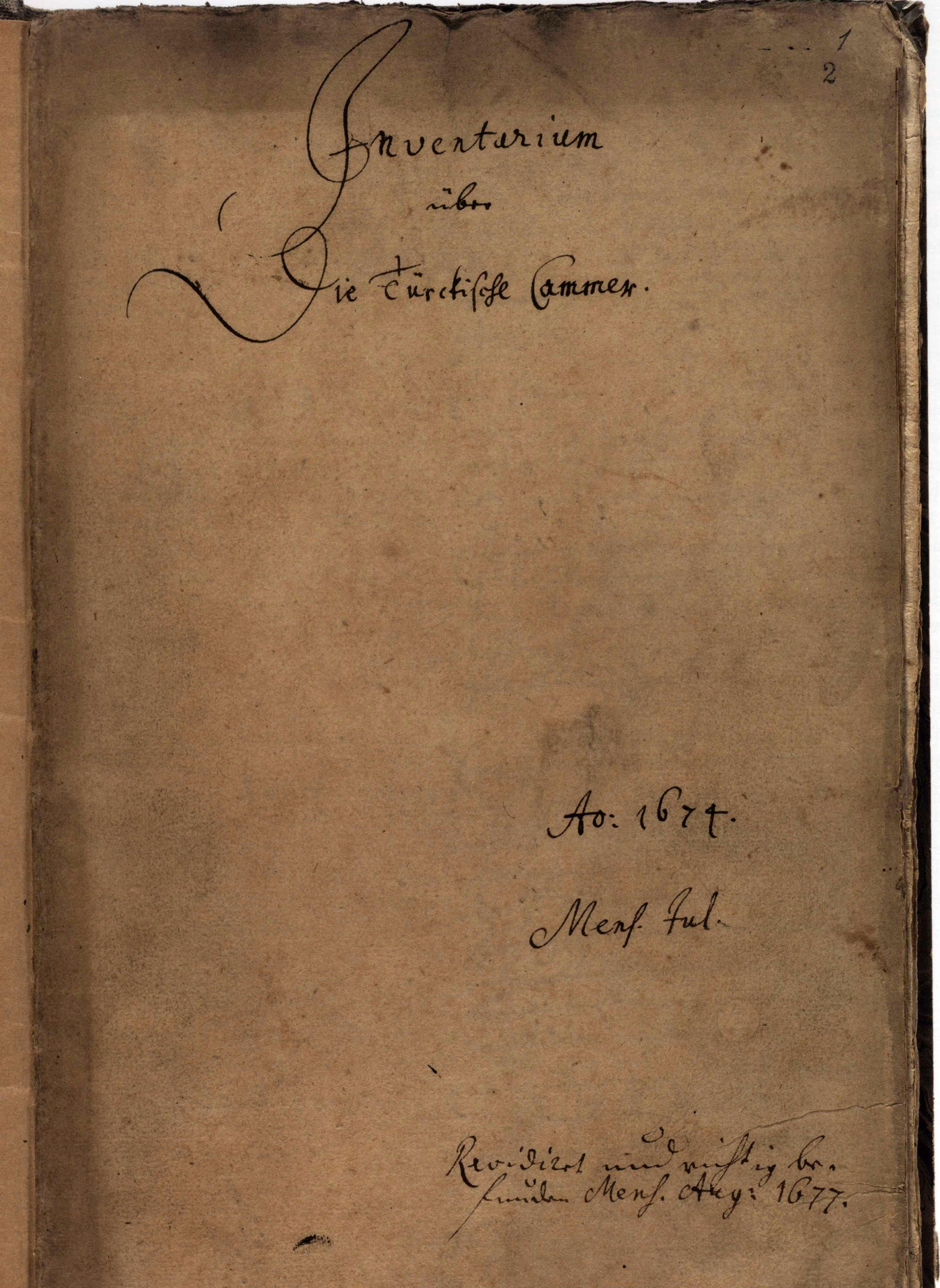
First inventory from 1674

The holdings of the Dresden Armoury include objects belonging to the Turkish Chamber (German: Türkische Kammer) which formed a separate collection within the armoury from at least 1591. Over the course of several centuries, diplomatic gifts, purchased objects, and booty gained in various battles against the Ottomans were assembled, creating one of the oldest and most significant collections of Ottoman art outside Turkey.

The roots of the oriental collection in Dresden can be traced back as far as 1591. At that time, the Turkish Chamber was still called Ungarische Kammer (Hungarian Chamber), probably because Saxony at that time had primarily come into contact with the Ottoman Empire in Hungary. The first recorded use of the name Turkish Chamber dates from 1614.

The first inventory of the oriental holdings of the Rüstkammer was compiled on request of Elector Johann Georg II of Saxony. The inventory was completed in July 1674 and revised in August 1677. It listed 385 items, divided into four groups: defensive weapons, reflex bows, pole weapons and flags, and finally saddles, bridles and caparisons.

After the dramatic years of the Great Northern War, August the Strong decided to reorganize his troops and renew their equipment. A military review of the 27,000-men-strong army was scheduled for June 1730, requiring an encampment near Zeithain north-west of Dresden with large tents. The biggest tent in the current exhibition was brought to Dresden specifically for this event in 1729. Originally, it consisted of a large roof section, two side walls and parts of an awning. One of the sidewalls and parts of the awning have been missing since the end of World War II. Nevertheless, it is one of the most magnificent surviving Ottoman tents in the world.

== Today's collection ==
Today's exhibition presents more than 600 individual pieces of art. The largest object in the Turkish Chamber is the three-mast tent brought to Dresden for the Zeithain encampment in 1730. This 20 m (66 ft) long, 8 m (26 ft) wide and 6 m (20 ft) high tent gives the viewer a sense of being under a second sky of gold and silk. The tent is made of satin, cotton and gilt leather; its restoration lasted 14 years. In addition, there are eight life-sized, carved wooden horses and a group of reflex bows with original strings, the oldest of which dates from 1586. Also shown are weapons, suits of chain mail, helmets, flags and costumes.

== See also ==
- List of museums in Saxony
- Bundeswehr Military History Museum
