= Carl Heumann =

German art collector (1886–1945)

Carl Heumann (19 March 1886 – 5 March 1945) was a German art collector persecuted by the Nazis because of his Jewish origins.

== Early life ==
Carl Heumann was born on 19 March 1886 in Cologne to Jewish parents. He converted to Protestantism in 1917 when he met and married Irmgard, who was a Protestant. He was a banker at Bankhaus Bayer & Heintze and consul in Chemnitz.

== Art collector ==
As an art collector, he was interested in German art of the Romantic period. He collected drawings by German and Austrian artists from the 18th and 19th centuries.

== Persecution under the Nazis ==
In 1938, Heumann was economically ruined by the Nazi's racial persecution: forced out of his own banking house, he had to pay the "Judenvermögensabgabe" and was no longer allowed to manage his own financial affairs, as a "Sicherungsanordnung" had been issued over his assets. Heumann was regarded by the Nazis as a ”full Jew.” At first he was protected by his mixed marriage. After the death of his non-Jewish wife Irmgard in January 1944, his protection ceased. He was forced to sell artworks, including three Fendi and Gensler prints, to ensure the family's livelihood.

== Death ==
Heumann was killed in a bombing raid in Chemnitz on 5 March 1945. Two of his children went to the United States after the war, where many of his descendants live today.

== Legacy ==
Several German museums are researching Heumann. In recognition of his persecution, the Kupferstich-Kabinett der Staatlichen Kunstsammlungen Dresden, the Stiftung Preußischer Kulturbesitz in Berlin and the Städtische Galerie im Lenbachhaus und Kunstbau München, among others, approached Carl Heumann's descendants in order to find a just and fair solution regarding the artworks from his collection.

In 2020, the Staatlichen Kunstsammlungen Dresden (SKD) restituted three graphic works from the Kupferstich-Kabinett to Heumann's family.

For "Provenance Research Day" on 14 April 2021 Heumann's granddaughter, Carol Heumann Snider, talked with provenance researchers Dr. Katja Lindenau (Staatliche Kunstsammlungen Dresden) and Melanie Wittchow (Lenbachhaus), about her grandfather and her father Thomas Heumann, describing how she preserves their stories and memories for her children and grandchildren.
