= Dresden Castle =

Castle in Dresden, Germany

Coordinates: 51°03′10″N 13°44′13″E

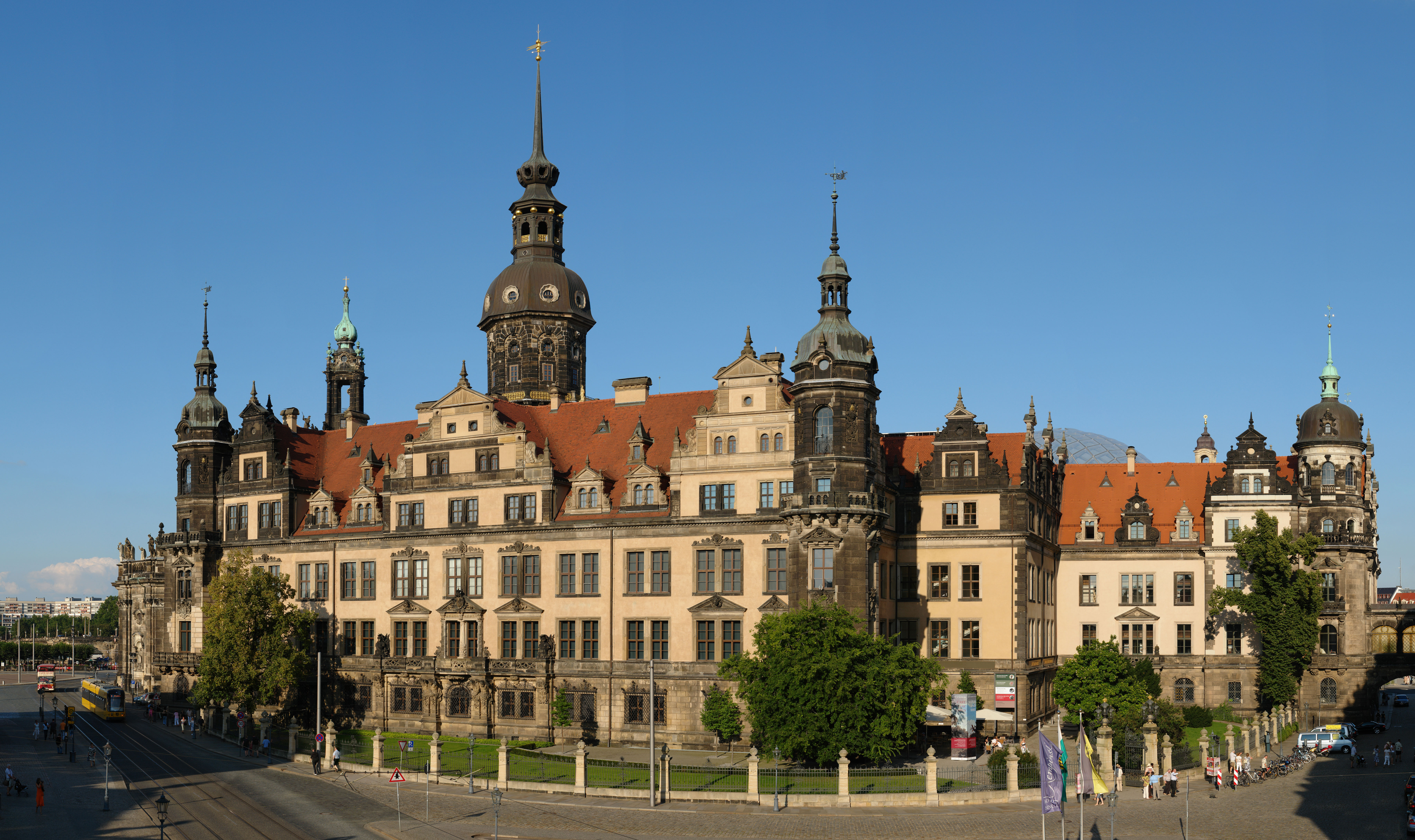
- Dresden Castle in 2008
- Interactive map of the Dresden Castle area

General information
- Architectural style: Neo-Renaissance, Baroque
- Location: Dresden, Germany
- Owner: Free State of Saxony

Dresden Castle or Royal Palace (German: Dresdner Residenzschloss or Dresdner Schloss) is one of the oldest buildings in Dresden, Germany. For almost 400 years, it was the residence of the electors (1547–1806) and kings (1806–1918) of Saxony from the Albertine House of Wettin as well as Kings of Poland (1697–1763). It is known for the different architectural styles employed, from Baroque to Neo-Renaissance.

Today, the residential castle is a museum complex that contains the Historic and New Green Vault, the Numismatic Cabinet, the Collection of Prints, Drawings and Photographs and the Dresden Armory with the Turkish Chamber. It also houses an art library and the management of the Dresden State Art Collections.

== History ==
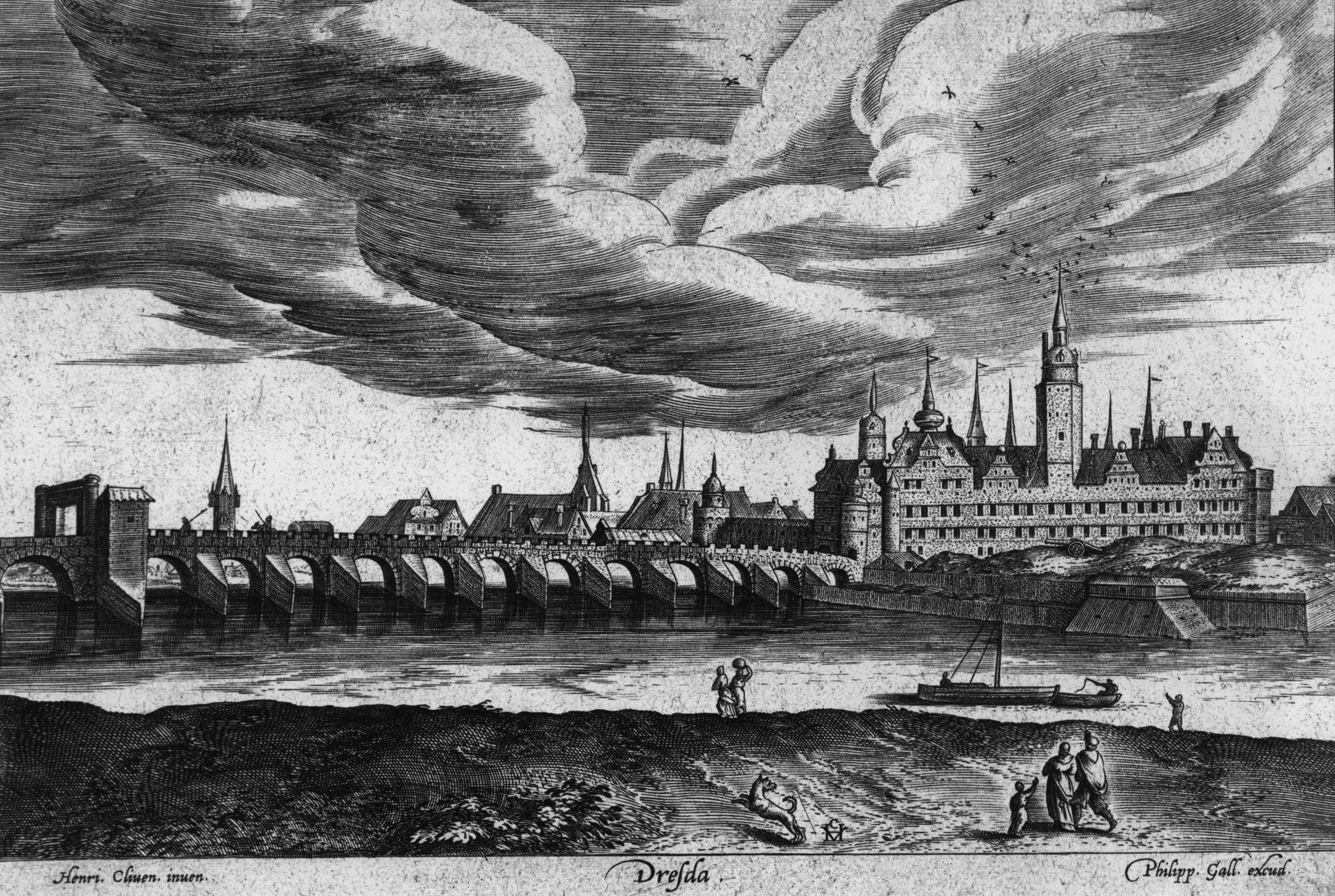
The castle in 1550

The original castle was a Romanesque keep, built around 1200. The Hausmannsturm was built at the beginning of the 15th century. From 1468 until 1480, the keep was extended by the master builder, Arnold von Westfalen, becoming an enclosed four-wing construction. In the middle of the 16th century, an addition was made in the Saxon Renaissance style.

After a major fire in 1701, Augustus II the Strong rebuilt much of the castle in the Baroque style. The collection rooms were created at this time in the western wing. The Silver Room, Heraldic Room and the Pretiosensaal were built from 1723–1726 and the Kaminzimmer, Juwelenzimmer (Jewel Room), Ivory Room and Bronze Room were built from 1727–1729.

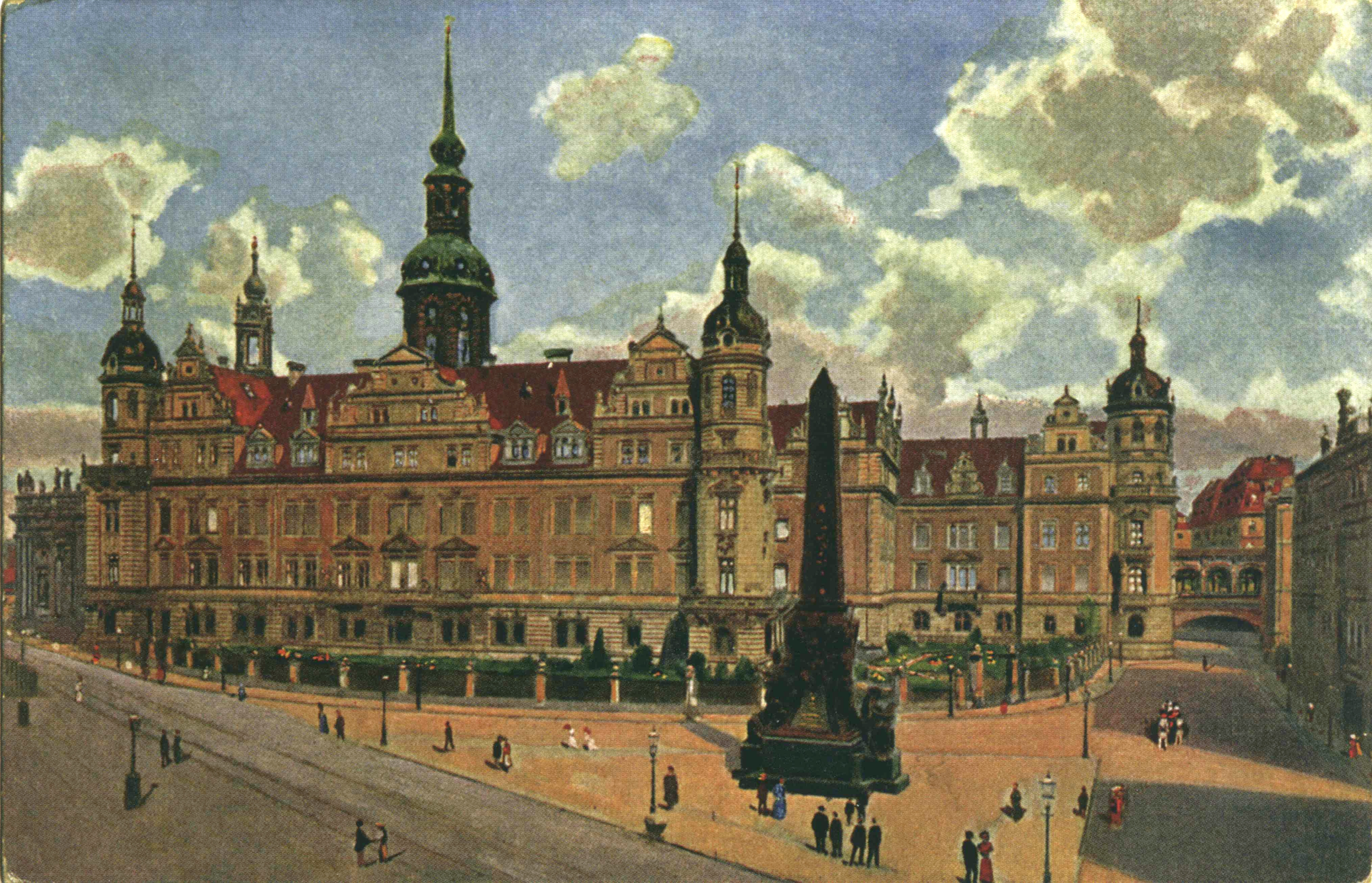
The castle in 1896

The 800th anniversary of the House of Wettin, Saxony's ruling family, resulted in more rebuilding between 1889 and 1901.

A Neo-Renaissance renovation was undertaken, followed by various modernizations, such as in-floor heating and electric lights in 1914. On the outside of the Stallhof (Stall Courtyard), which links the castle complex with the adjacent Johanneum, the "Procession of Princes" was painted by the artist Wilhelm Walther. The 102-meter-long mural represents the history of the Wettins. Since it quickly faded, it was transferred to about 23,000 Meissen porcelain tiles between 1904 and 1907.

Most of the castle was reduced to a roofless shell during 13 February 1945 bombing of Dresden in World War II. Three rooms of the Green Vault were destroyed. However, the collections survived, having been moved to safety at Königstein Fortress in the early years of the war.

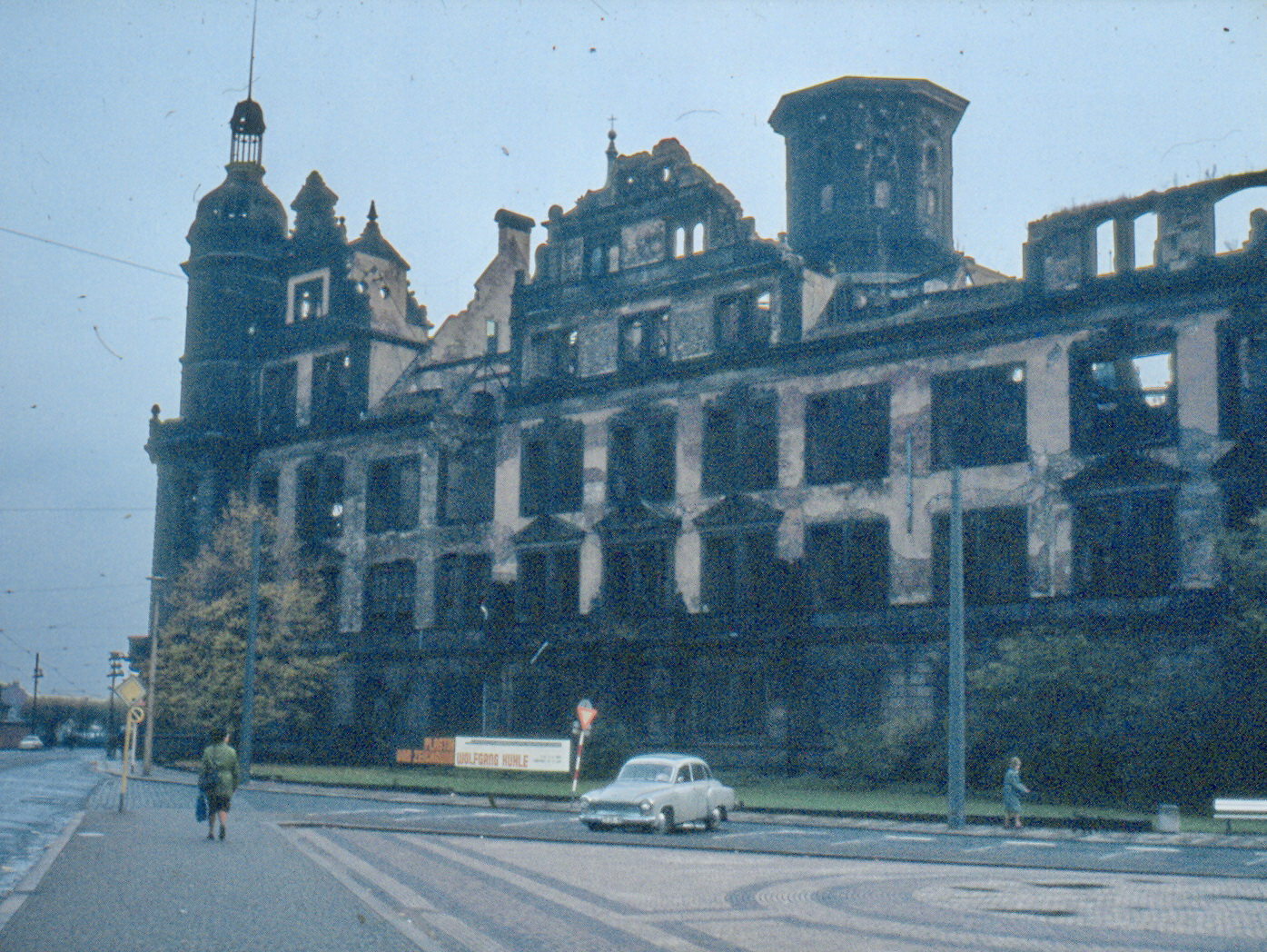
Ruins of the castle, 1980

For the first 15 years after the end of the Second World War, no attempt was made to rebuild the castle, except to install a temporary roof in 1946. Restoration began in the 1960s with the installation of some new windows and progressed slowly in following decades (see the photo of the central wing from 1980). The castle's restoration is ongoing, with part of the State Apartments reopening in September 2019.

== Museums ==
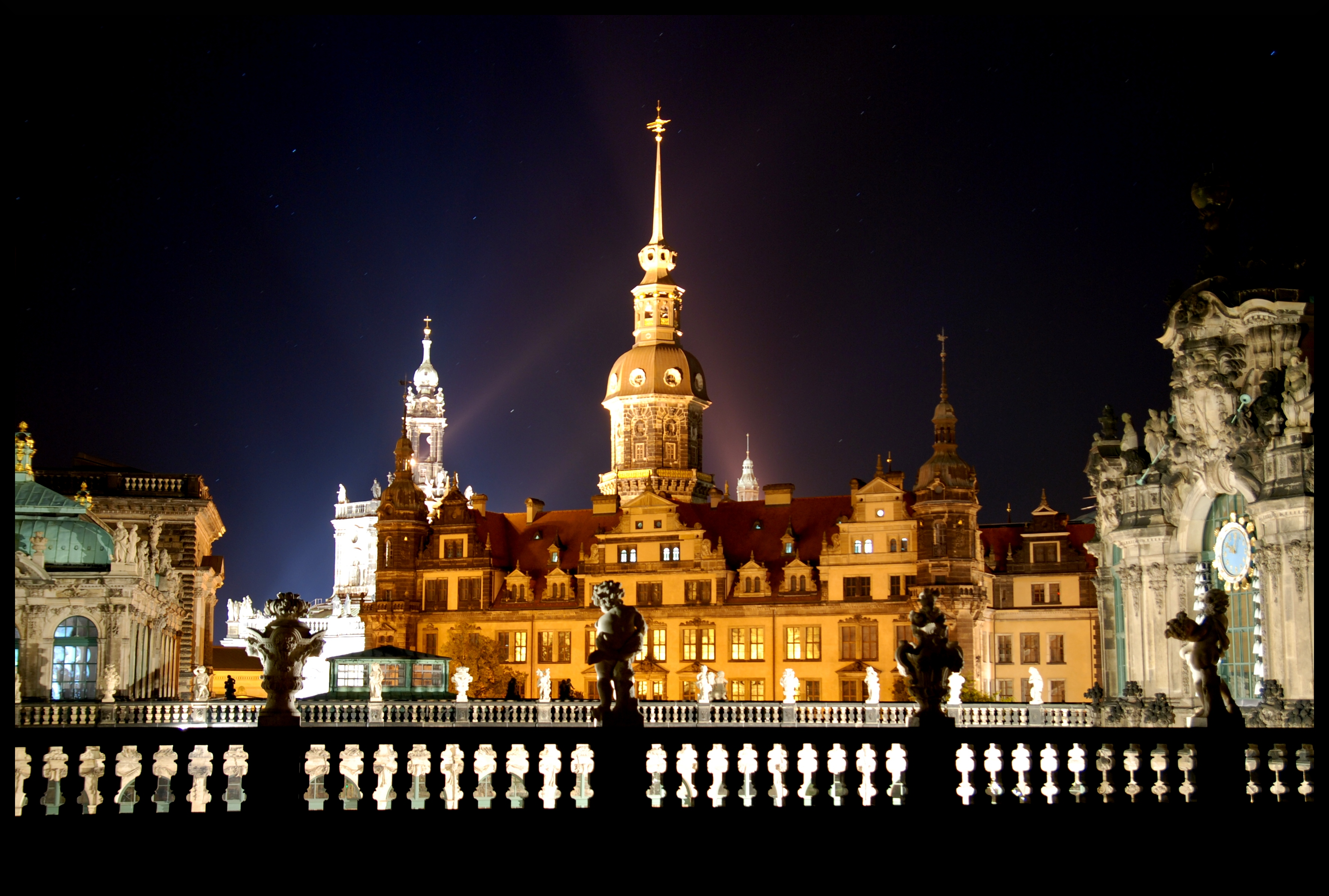
The castle at night, 2008

Dresden Castle houses five museum sections, the Historic Green Vault and the New Green Vault, the Numismatic Cabinet, the Collection of Prints, Drawings and Photographs and the Dresden Armoury with the Turkish Chamber and the Renaissance Wing.

Also accessible is an art library (Kunstbibliothek) with approximately 260,000 volumes of special literature on art history. The character of the holdings is closely related to the collecting focal points of the museums.

=== Historic and New Green Vault ===
The Green Vault (Grünes Gewölbe) is a museum that contains the largest collection of treasures in Europe. Founded by Augustus II the Strong in 1723, it features a unique and rich variety of exhibits from the period of baroque to classicism. The museum consists of the Historic Green Vault (Historisches Grünes Gewölbe) and the New Green Vault (Neues Grünes Gewölbe).

The Historic Green Vault is known for its treasure chambers and is itself a baroque work of art. The New Green Vault is more modern. The Historic Green Vault is located on the ground floor of the Dresden Castle and visits require an advance booking; admittance to the New Green Vault, which is on the second floor, is not limited.

=== Numismatic Cabinet (Coin Cabinet) ===
The Numismatic Cabinet (Münzkabinett), with its nearly 300,000 pieces, is one of Dresden’s oldest museums, dating back to the early 16th century. It contains one of the largest universal collections in Europe. Its broad-spectrum ranges from classical antiquity to present-day coins. Some 30,000 Saxon coins and medals represent different periods in Saxony's history. The collection also includes orders and insignia, banknotes and historic bonds, models, seals, minting dies for coins and medals, as well as minting machines and equipment.

The exhibition shows around 3,300 outstanding objects in four rooms, which represent a cross-section of the various parts of the collection. The Numismatic Cabinet is also a center of scholarly research and has a public library of some 30,000 volumes.

=== Collection of Prints, Drawings and Photographs ===
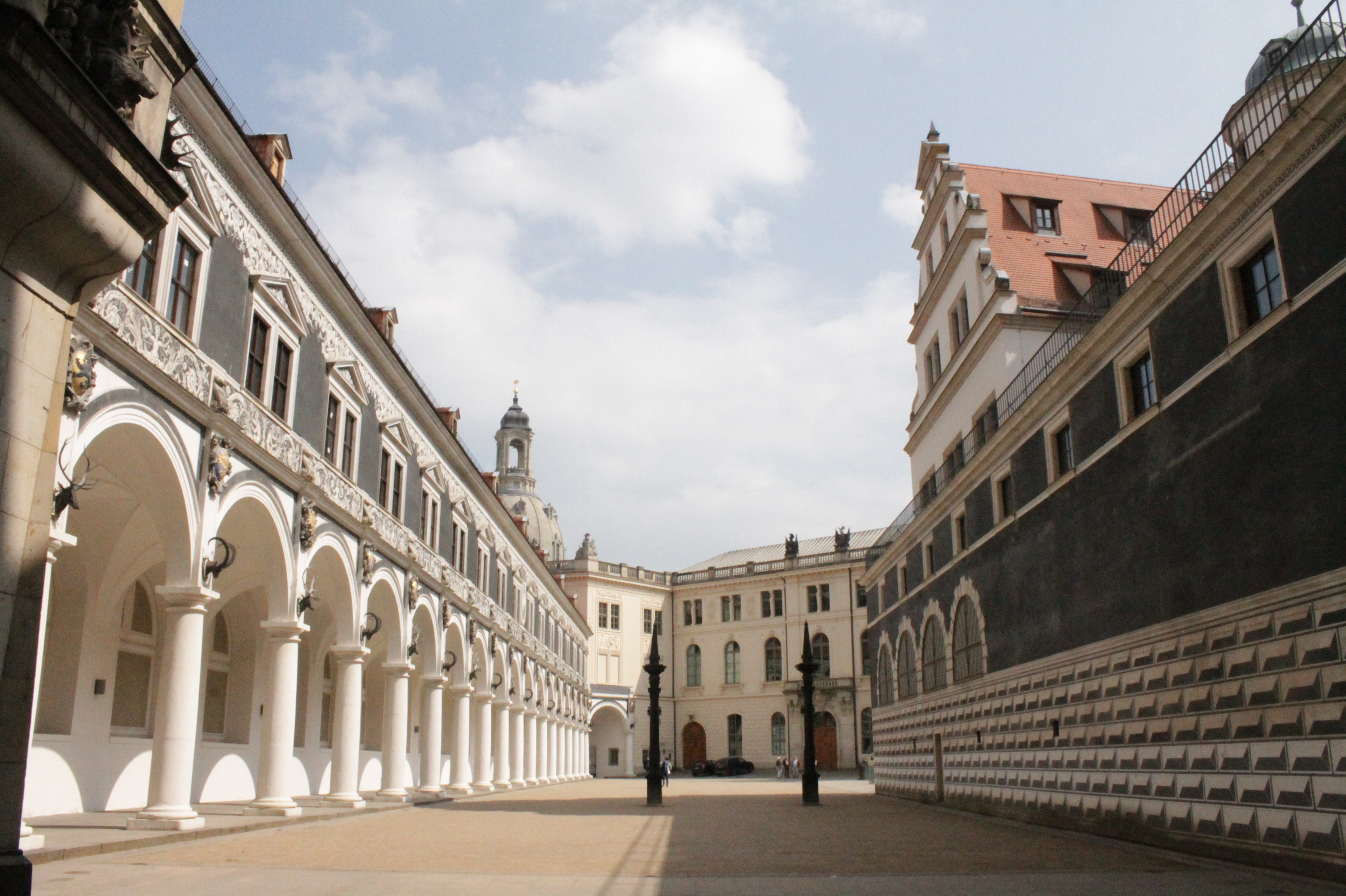
Eastern courtyard of Dresden Castle (21st-century reconstruction)

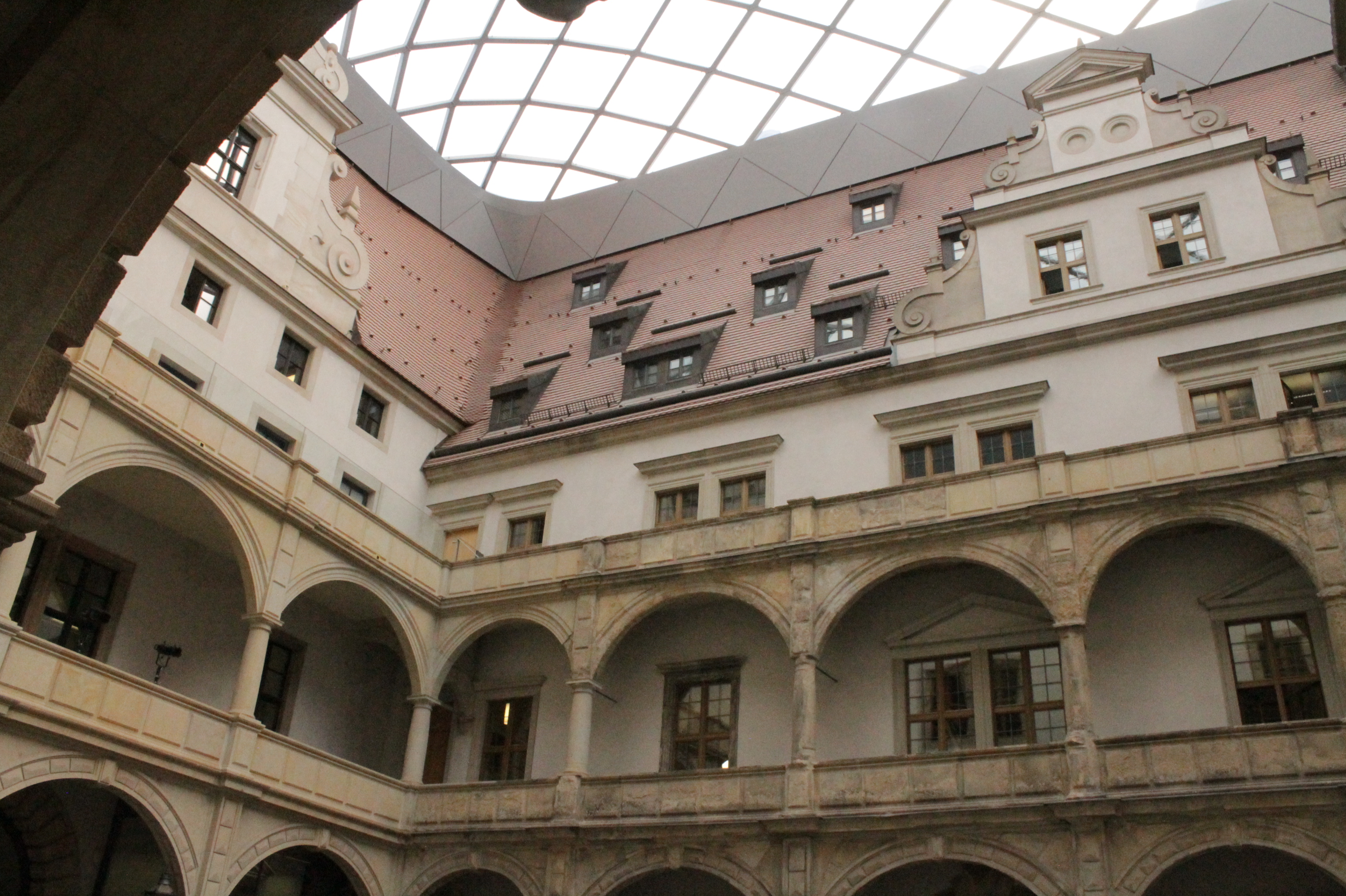
Enclosed western courtyard of Dresden Castle (museum entrance)

The Collection of Prints, Drawings and Photographs (Kupferstich-Kabinett) shows work by renowned artists from numerous countries. There are approximately 515,000 objects by more than 20,000 artists across eight centuries. It holds drawings and prints by old masters such as Albrecht Dürer, Rembrandt, Michelangelo and Caspar David Friedrich, as well as later artists, like Henri de Toulouse-Lautrec and Pablo Picasso. Engravings by Martin Schongauer and woodcuts by Lucas Cranach the Elder are shown along with photographic works. There is also a collection of drawings and graphic art by Käthe Kollwitz.

=== Dresden Armory with the Turkish Chamber and the Renaissance Wing ===
Originating from weapons owned by Saxon Dukes and Electors, the Dresden Armory (Rüstkammer) owns one of the most valuable collections of weapons and armory in the world. The exhibition includes around 10,000 objects, including helmets, shields, swords, rapiers, daggers, sabres and maces, pistols and rifles, riding equipment and ceremonial clothes.

The Turkish Chamber (Türckische Cammer) is a separate collection within the Dresden Armory that is focused on art from the Ottoman Empire. It displays more than 600 objects of art from the Ottoman Empire, making it one of the oldest and most significant Ottoman-era collections outside Turkey. Between the 16th and the 19th centuries, the electors of Saxony, motivated by their passion for collecting and their desire for princely prestige, amassed a wealth of "turquerie".

The Renaissance Wing (Renaissanceflügel) presents a multitude of ornate objects, costumes, and weapons, offering a unique glimpse into the world of the Electors of Saxony during the Renaissance.

=== State Apartments ===
A suite of four fully restored staterooms reopened in September 2019, marking the 300th anniversary since they were first constructed by Augustus the Strong. Additionally, the Small Ballroom in the Georgenbau has reopened, showcasing one of the 19th-century additions to the palace.

=== Burglary ===
On 25 November 2019, masked burglars stole royal Polish-Saxon jewels and priceless objects from the museum. They disabled a junction box and were able to enter the premises through a diversion. The getaway car was later found in an underground car park. The press called the burglary one of the largest and most significant since World War II, with the loot's worth estimated at nearly $130 million.

== See also ==
- Pillnitz Castle – Summer residence of the electors and kings of Saxony
- Moritzburg Castle – Hunting lodge of the electors and kings of Saxony
- List of castles in Saxony
