= Museum für Völkerkunde =

Museum für Völkerkunde or Völkerkundemuseum may refer to:

- Museum of Ethnology Dresden
- Museum Five Continents, Munich (formerly known as State Museum of Ethnology)
- Museum of Ethnology, Hamburg
- Museum of Ethnology, Vienna
- Ethnological Museum of Berlin
- Leipzig Museum of Ethnography
