= List of museums in Saxony =

This list of museums in Saxony shows the museums in the German federated state of Saxony by location in alphabetical order:

== A ==
- Adorf/Vogtl., Vogtlandkreis
  - Bad Elster Spa Museum
  - Adorf Museum
- Altenberg, Landkreis Sächsische Schweiz-Osterzgebirge
  - Altenberg Mining Museum
- Annaberg-Buchholz, Erzgebirgskreis
  - Adam Ries Museum
  - Ore Mountain Museum and Gößner visitor mine
  - Frohnauer Hammer Technology Museum
  - Markus Röhling Stolln Visitor Mine, Frohnau
  - Dorothea-Stolln Visitor Mine, Cunersdorf
  - Experience Museum Manufaktur der Träume
- Ansprung, Erzgebirgskreis
  - Heimatstube Ansprung
- Antonsthal, Erzgebirgskreis
  - Silberwäsche Technology Museum
- Aue, Erzgebirgskreis
  - Art Alt Aue Gallery
  - Atelier Ernst Hecker
  - Museum of the town of Aue
- Auerbach, Vogtlandkreis
  - GöltzschtalGallery NikolaiChurch
  - Heimatstuben Auerbach
  - Museum Auerbach
  - Mining Museum Maffeischächte
- Augustusburg, Landkreis Mittelsachsen
  - Coach museum
  - Motorcycle museum
  - Game and Bird museums

== B ==
- Bad Brambach, Vogtlandkreis
  - Heimatstube Bad Brambach
- Bad Düben, Landkreis Nordsachsen
  - Düben Heath Countryside Museum
- Bad Gottleuba, Landkreis Sächsische Schweiz-Osterzgebirge
  - Local History Museum Bad Gottleuba
  - Medical History Exhibition
- Bad Muskau, Landkreis Görlitz
  - Town and Park Museum
- Bad Schandau, Landkreis Sächsische Schweiz-Osterzgebirge
  - Local History Museum
- Bad Schlema, Erzgebirgskreis
  - „Markus Semmler’‘Visitor Mine
  - Traditionsstätte des Sächsisch - Thüringischen Uranerzbergbaus (Museum Uranbergbau)
- Bannewitz, Landkreis Sächsische Schweiz-Osterzgebirge
  - Nöthnitz Renaissance Castle Museum
- Bautzen, Landkreis Bautzen
  - Alte WasserArt Bautzen
  - Domschatzkammer St. Petri
  - Budissin Gallery
  - Bautzen Memorial
  - Reichenturm
  - Serbski Muzej
  - Bautzen Town Museum
  - Sternwarte Bautzen
  - Großwelka Dinosaur Garden
  - Kleinwelka Dinosaur Park
  - Kleinwelka Miniature Park
- Belgern, Landkreis Nordsachsen
  - Local History Museum
- Bernsdorf, Hoyerswerda
  - Zeißholz Village Museum
- Bernstadt auf dem Eigen, Landkreis Görlitz
  - Local History Museum
- Bischofswerda, Landkreis Bautzen
  - Carl Lohse Gallery
- Borna, Landkreis Leipzig
  - Gallery in Bürgerhaus
  - Borna Town Museum
- Brand-Erbisdorf, Landkreis Mittelsachsen
  - Industrial Museum
  - Huthaus Einigkeit Museum
  - Bartholomäus-Schacht Show Mine
- Braunsdorf, Landkreis Mittelsachsen
  - Historic Weberei
- Breitenbrunn, Erzgebirgskreis
  - Bergmännisches Traditionskabinett
  - Mining Exhibition
- Burgstädt, Landkreis Mittelsachsen
  - Historic Doctor’s Practice
  - Town Museum

== C ==
- Cämmerswalde
  - Show aeroplanes
- Chemnitz
  - Saxon Railway Museum
  - Museum of Saxon Vehicles
  - Botanical Gardens, School of Biology
  - Museum for Natural History
  - New Saxon Gallery
  - Roter Turm
  - Chemnitz Art Collections
  - Gunzenhauser Museum
  - Chemnitz Castle Mining Museum
  - Felsendome Rabenstein Show Mine
  - Rabenstein Castle
  - Information and Documentation Centre of the BStU
  - German Games Museum
  - Saxon Industrial Museum
  - Rosenkranz Gallery
  - Henry van de Velde Museum in the Villa Esche
  - Chemnitz Zoo
- Colditz, Landkreis Leipzig
  - Colditz Escape Museum
  - Johann David Köhler Haus
  - Colditz Town Museum
- Coswig, Landkreis Meißen
  - Karrasburg Museum
  - Villa Teresa
- Crimmitschau, Landkreis Zwickau
  - WestSaxon Textilmuseum
  - Agrar- and Open-Air Museum
  - Sternwarte Crimmitschau
- Cunewalde, Landkreis Bautzen
  - Exhibition Historicr Zimmermannswerkzeuge Gaststätte „Kleene Schänke’‘
  - Haus des Gastes „Dreiseitenhof’‘ mit Oldtimer Museum
  - Polenz Museum Cunewalde
  - School Museum Grundschule „Friedrich Schiller’‘

== D ==
- Dahlen, Landkreis Nordsachsen
  - Local History Museum
- Delitzsch, Landkreis Nordsachsen
  - Castle Museum Delitzsch
  - Schulze-Delitzsch Haus
- Dippoldiswalde, Landkreis Sächsische Schweiz-Osterzgebirge
  - Lohgerber-, Town and County Museum
  - Museum OsterzgebirgsGallery
- Dittelsdorf, Landkreis Görlitz
  - Local History Museum
- Dittmannsdorf, Landkreis Mittelsachsen
  - Geringswalde Local History and Farm Museum
- Dohna, Landkreis Sächsische Schweiz-Osterzgebirge
  - Local History Museum
- Dommitzsch, Landkreis Nordsachsen
  - Museum of the town of Dommitzsch
- Dorf Wehlen, Landkreis Sächsische Schweiz-Osterzgebirge
  - Miniaturausstellung „Kleine Sächsische Schweiz’‘
- Dorfchemnitz, Landkreis Mittelsachsen
  - Technology Museum „Eisenhammer’‘
- Döbeln, Landkreis Mittelsachsen
  - Döbeln Town Museum
- Dresden, state capital
  - SLUB Dresden Book Museum
  - German Hygiene Museum DHMD
  - Dresdner Football Museum
  - Bw Dresden-Altstadt Railway Museum
  - Erich Kästner Museum
  - Dresden Bicycle Museum
  - Dresden Fort
  - Bautzner Straße Memorial, Dresden
  - Münchner Platz Memorial, Dresden
  - Hofmühle Dresden
  - KleinFarm Museum Reitzendorf
  - KraftWerk – Dresden Energy Museum
  - Arthaus Dresden
  - Landesmuseum for Pre-History Dresden (State Museum for Pre-History)
  - Leonhardi Museum
  - Heliotype Workshop Museum
  - Bundeswehr Military History Museum
  - Windberg Railway History Museum
  - Dresden Panometer
  - Plattenbau Museum
  - Collections and Artbesitz der TU Dresden
  - School Museum Dresden
  - Sparkasse Museum Dresden
  - State Art Collections, Dresden
    - Gemäldegalerie Alte Meister (Old Masters Painting Gallery)
    - Galerie Neue Meister (New Masters Gallery)
    - Kupferstich-Kabinett (Collection of Prints, Drawings and Photographs)
    - Grünes Gewölbe (Green Vault) with the Historic and the New Green Vault
    - Mathematisch-Physikalischer Salon (Royal Cabinet of Mathematical and Physical Instruments)
    - Rüstkammer (Armoury) with the Turkish Chamber
    - Porzellansammlung (Porcelain Collection)
    - Münzkabinett (Coin Cabinet)
    - Skulpturensammlung (Sculpture Collection)
    - Kunstgewerbemuseum (Arts and Crafts Museum) Pillnitz Castle
    - Museum für Völkerkunde Dresden (Ethnographical Museum Dresden)
    - Museum für Sächsische Volkskunst and Puppentheatersammlung (Saxon Folk Art Museum and Puppet Theatre Collection)
  - State Natural History Collections, Dresden
    - Museum for Mineralogy and Geology, Dresden
    - State Museum of Zoology, Dresden
  - Dresden City Museum
    - Carl Maria von Weber Museum
    - Heimat- and Palitzschmuseum Prohlis
    - Kraszewski Museum
    - Kügelgenhaus – Museum der Dresdner Romantik
    - Schillerhäuschen
    - Dresden Town Museum (STMD)
    - Dresden City Art Gallery
    - Technical Collections of the City of Dresden (TSD) in Striesen
  - Dresden Tram Museum
  - Dresden Transport Museum
  - → see also: Museums in Dresden

== E ==
- Ebersbach, Landkreis Görlitz
  - Firefighting Museum
  - Local History Museum Humboldtbaude, auf dem Schlechteberg
- Ehrenfriedersdorf, Erzgebirgskreis
  - Mining and Greifenstein Museum
  - Zinngrube Ehrenfriedersdorf
- Eibau, Landkreis Görlitz
  - Faktorenhof
  - Local History and Humboldt Museum, on the Beckenberg
- Eibenstock, Erzgebirgskreis
  - Town Local History Museum, Eibenstock
  - Stickerei-Schauwerkstatt Eibenstock
- Eilenburg, Landkreis Nordsachsen
  - Eilenburg Town Museum
- Erlbach, Vogtlandkreis
  - Vogtland Village Museum

== F ==
- Falkenstein/Vogtl., Vogtlandkreis
  - Falkenstein Local History Museum
- Frankenberg, Landkreis Mittelsachsen
  - Frankenberger Fahrzeugmuseum
  - Museum of the town of Frankenberg
  - Collection for Paper and Printing History
  - Thonet Museum
- Frauenstein, Landkreis Mittelsachsen
  - Gottfried Silbermann Museum
- Frauwalde Landkreis Leipzig
  - Museum for Pre- and Early History
- Freiberg, Landkreis Mittelsachsen
  - The Freiberg Silver Mine
  - Technical Collections of the Freiberg Mining Academy
  - Mineralogical and Mineral Deposit Collection
  - Natural History Museum
  - Palaeontology and Stratigraphic Collection
  - Town and Mining Museum Freiberg
  - Kavernenkraftwerk Drei-Brüder-Schacht mit InformationsCentre ‘‘WassErleben’‘
- Freital, Landkreis Sächsische Schweiz-Osterzgebirge
  - Haus der Heimat
- Frohburg, Landkreis Leipzig
  - Museum in Castle Frohburg

== G ==
- Geising, Landkreis Sächsische Schweiz-Osterzgebirge
  - Silberstollen Show Mine
- Geithain, Landkreis Leipzig
  - Local History Museum
- Gelenau, Erzgebirgskreis
  - German Strumpfmuseum
- Geyer, Erzgebirgskreis
  - Local History Museum in Wachtturm
- Glashütte, Landkreis Sächsische Schweiz-Osterzgebirge
  - Clock Museum
- Glauchau, Landkreis Zwickau
  - Museum and Art Collection
  - Gluchowe Town Gallery Art
- Gneisenaustadt Schildau, Landkreis Nordsachsen
  - Gneisenau Memorial
- Görlitz
  - see Görlitzer Museum
- Gohrisch, Landkreis Sächsische Schweiz-Osterzgebirge
  - Cunnersdorf Local History Museum
- Graupa, Landkreis Sächsische Schweiz-Osterzgebirge
  - Richard Wagner Museum
- Grethen, Landkreis Leipzig
  - Firefighting Museum
- Grillenburg, Landkreis Sächsische Schweiz-Osterzgebirge
  - Forestry and Hunting Museum, Grillenburg Castle
- Grimma, Landkreis Leipzig
  - Grimma County Museum
  - Grimma Town Gallery
  - Göschenhaus
- Groitzsch, Landkreis Leipzig
  - Groitzsch Town Museum
- Großbothen, Landkreis Leipzig
  - Wilhelm Ostwald Memorial
- Großenhain, Landkreis Meißen
  - Old Latin School Museum
- Großolbersdorf, Erzgebirgskreis
  - Museum of Number Plates
- Großpösna, Landkreis Leipzig
  - Botanical Gardens for Medicinal and Herbal Plants
- Großröhrsdorf, Landkreis Bautzen
  - Local History Museum
  - Technology Museum
- Großschönau, Landkreis Görlitz
  - German Damast- and Frottiermuseum
  - Motorcycle Veterans and Technology Museum
- Großzschepa, Landkreis Leipzig
  - Local History Museum
- Grüna, Landkreis Zwickau
  - Ständige Gedenkausstellung Ernst Georg
- Grünhainichen, Erzgebirgskreis
  - Permanent Exhibitions
- Grünhain-Beierfeld, Erzgebirgskreis
  - Red Cross Museum, Beierfeld
  - Herkules Frisch GlückShow Mine, Waschleithe

== H ==
- Hainichen, Landkreis Mittelsachsen
  - Gellert Museum
  - Hainichen Local History Museum
- Hartenstein, Landkreis Zwickau
  - Stein Castle Museum
- Hartmannsdorf-Reichenau, Landkreis Sächsische Schweiz-Osterzgebirge
  - Reichenau Weichelt Mill
- Heidenau, Landkreis Sächsische Schweiz-Osterzgebirge
  - Großsedlitz French Garden
- Hermsdorf, Landkreis Sächsische Schweiz-Osterzgebirge
  - Farming & Local History Museum
- Herrnhut, Landkreis Görlitz
  - Exhibition der Evangelischen Brüder-Unität
  - Herrnhut Local History Museum
  - Herrnhut Folk Art Museum
- Hirschfelde, Landkreis Görlitz
  - Technology Monument & Museum Kraftwerk Hirschfelde
- Hohburg, Landkreis Leipzig
  - Steinarbeiterhaus Museum
- Hohenstein-Ernstthal, Landkreis Zwickau
  - Textil- and Rennsportmuseum
  - Karl May Haus
  - Buntes Holz Museum
- Hohnstein, Landkreis Sächsische Schweiz-Osterzgebirge
  - Castle Museum Hohnstein
- Holtendorf, Landkreis Görlitz
  - Schlesisch-Oberlausitzer Village Museum
- Hoyerswerda, Hoyerswerda
  - Hoyerswerda Town Museum
  - Trachtenhaus Jatzwauk
- Hundshübel, Erzgebirgskreis
  - Nadlerhaus
- Höfgen, Landkreis Leipzig
  - Wassermühle Höfgen

== J ==
- Johanngeorgenstadt, Erzgebirgskreis
  - Lehr- and Show Mine
  - Pferdegöpel Johanngeorgenstadt
- Jöhstadt, Erzgebirgskreis
  - PreßnitzValley Railway

== K ==
- Kamenz
  - Lessing Museum
  - Museum der Westlausitz
- Kauschwitz, Vogtlandkreis
  - Memorial Flieshalle
- Kirschau, Landkreis Bautzen
  - Körse Castle Museum
- Klingenthal, Vogtlandkreis
  - Music and Winter Sports Museum
- Knappenrode, Hoyerswerda
  - Lusatian Mining Museum
  - Feuerstättenmuseum
  - LG Lusatian Grubenbahn e. V.
- Kohren-Sahlis, Landkreis Leipzig
  - Pottery Museum
  - Gnandstein Castle (in the village of Gnandstein)
- Königshain, Landkreis Görlitz
  - Königshain Granite Quarry Museum
  - Königshain Castle Complex
- Königstein, Landkreis Sächsische Schweiz-Osterzgebirge
  - Königstein Fort Museum
- Krebes, Vogtlandkreis
  - Hermann Vogel Haus
  - Krebes Museum House
- Kriebethal, Landkreis Mittelsachsen
  - Kriebstein Castle Museum
- Krippen, Landkreis Sächsische Schweiz-Osterzgebirge
  - Friedrich Gottlob Keller Memorial
- Kurort Jonsdorf, Landkreis Görlitz
  - Weberstube Jonsdorf
- Kurort Oberwiesenthal, Erzgebirgskreis
  - Ski and Local History Museum
  - Cranzahl, Oberwiesenthal
- Kühren, Landkreis Leipzig
  - Village and Farm Museum

== L ==
- Landwüst, Vogtlandkreis
  - Vogtland Open-Air Museum
- Lauenstein, Landkreis Sächsische Schweiz-Osterzgebirge
  - Castle Museum Lauenstein
- Leipzig
  - Egyptian Museum of the University of Leipzig
  - Museum of Antiquities of the University of Leipzig
  - Automatik Museum der Hochschule for Technik, Wirtschaft and Kultur Leipzig
  - German Kleingärtnermuseum
  - German Book and Schriftmuseum
  - Railway Museum Bayerischer Bahnhof zu Leipzig
  - Grassi Museum
    - Museum of Applied Arts
    - Museum of Ethnography
    - Museum of Musical Instruments of the University of Leipzig
  - Galerie für Zeitgenössische Kunst
  - Memorial Museum in der „Runden Ecke’‘
  - Gohliser Schlösschen
  - Kamera- and Fotomuseum Leipzig
  - Leipzig Children’s Museum
  - 1813 Völkerschlacht Memorialmuseum
  - MitToy Museum (Leipzig)
  - Museum der bildenden Künste
  - Museum for DruckArt
  - Museum in Mendelssohn Haus
  - Museum in Schumann Haus
  - Leipzig Natural History Museum
  - Leipzig Panometer
  - Saxon Apothecary Museum, Leipzig
  - Saxon Psychiatric Museum, Leipzig
  - Leipzig School Museum
  - Leipzig-Möckern Tram Museum
  - Stadtgeschichtliches Museum
    - Zum Arabischen Coffe Baum Museum
    - Schillerhaus (Leipzig)
    - Leipzig Sports Museum
    - VölkerschlachtMonument / FORUM 1813
  - Unikatum Children's Museum, Leipzig
  - Zeitgeschichtliches Forum Leipzig
- Leisnig, Landkreis Mittelsachsen
  - Leisnig Arctic-Alpine Botanical Garden
  - Staatlicher Castlebetrieb Castle Mildenstein
- Lengefeld, Erzgebirgskreis
  - Museum Technology Monument
- Lengenfeld, Vogtlandkreis
  - Firefighting Museum
  - Local History Museum
- Lichtenstein, Landkreis Zwickau
  - Daetz-Centrum
  - 1st Saxon Coffee Pot Museum, (Lichtenstein, OT Heinrichsort)
  - Museum of the town of Lichtenstein
  - Doll and Toy Museum
- Lichtenwalde, Landkreis Mittelsachsen
  - Castle Lichtenwalde
- Liebenau, Landkreis Sächsische Schweiz-Osterzgebirge
  - Liebenau Farm Museum
- Liebstadt, Landkreis Sächsische Schweiz-Osterzgebirge
  - Kuckuckstein Castle Museum
- Limbach-Oberfrohna, Landkreis Zwickau
  - Industry and Local History Museum
  - Heimatstube „Fronfeste’‘
  - Hoyersheimathaus
- Lindigtvorwerk, Landkreis Leipzig
  - Mühlenmuseum Lindigtmühle
- Lugau, Erzgebirgskreis
  - Local History Museum
- Löbau, Landkreis Görlitz
  - Town Museum

== M ==
- Marienberg, Erzgebirgskreis
  - Town and Local History Museum
- Markersdorf, Landkreis Görlitz
  - Village Museum Markersdorf
- Markkleeberg, Landkreis Leipzig
  - German Agricultural Museum Markkleeberg
- Markneukirchen, Vogtlandkreis
  - Musical Instrument Museum
  - Collection of mechanical music instruments
- Markranstädt, Landkreis Leipzig
  - Markranstädt Local History Museum
- Maxen, Landkreis Sächsische Schweiz-Osterzgebirge
  - Maxen Local History Museum
  - Maxen Lime Kiln Museum
- Meerane, Landkreis Zwickau
  - Local History Museum
  - Art-In Gallery
- Meißen, Landkreis Meißen
  - Albrechtsburg Museum
  - Pianoforte Museum
  - Schauhalle
  - Town Museum Meißen
- Mittweida, Landkreis Mittelsachsen
  - Museum of the town of Mittweida
- Morgenröthe-Rautenkranz, Vogtlandkreis
  - German Space Travel Exhibition
- Moritzburg, Landkreis Meißen
  - State Museum for Animals
  - Käthe Kollwitz Memorial
  - Moritzburg Castle Museum
  - Saxon State Stud, Moritzburg
- Mutzschen, Landkreis Leipzig
  - Town Museum Mutzschen
- Mügeln, Landkreis Nordsachsen
  - DGB Döllnitzbahn GmbH
  - Local History Museum
  - Local History Museum
- Müglitztal, Landkreis Sächsische Schweiz-Osterzgebirge
  - Local History Museum Maxen
  - Lime Kiln Museum Maxen
  - Lindenmuseum Clara Schumann in Schmorsdorf
  - Weesenstein Castle
- Mylau, Vogtlandkreis
  - Mylau Castle Museum
- Mülsen St. Jacob, Landkreis Zwickau
  - Gold and Silversmith Museum
- Mölkau, Landkreis Leipzig
  - Camera and Photography Museum

== N ==
- Naundorf, Landkreis Sächsische Schweiz-Osterzgebirge
  - Robert Sterl Haus
- Naunhof, Landkreis Leipzig
  - Tower Clock Museum
- Neißeaue, OT Zodel, Landkreis Görlitz
  - Traugott Gerber Museum
- Neschwitz, Landkreis Bautzen
  - Old Castle, Neschwitz
- Netzschkau, Vogtlandkreis
  - Netzschkau Castle Museum
- Neuensalz, Vogtlandkreis
  - Neuensalz Chapel
- Neugersdorf, Landkreis Görlitz
  - Neugersdorf Local History Museum
- Neuhausen/Erzgeb., Landkreis Mittelsachsen
  - Ore Mountain Glassworks Museum
  - Neuhausen Nutcracker Museum
  - ‘‘Alte Stuhlfabrik’‘ Technology Museum
  - Motorcycle Exhibition
- Neukirch, Landkreis Bautzen
  - Neukirch Local History Museum
- Neumark, Vogtlandkreis
  - Neumark School Museum
- Neusalza-Spremberg, Landkreis Görlitz
  - BauMonument and Local History Museum Reiterhaus
- Neustadt in Saxony, Landkreis Sächsische Schweiz-Osterzgebirge
  - Local History Museum
- Niedercunnersdorf, Landkreis Görlitz
  - Local History Museum „Alte Weberstube’‘
- Niederwiesa, Landkreis Mittelsachsen
  - Firefighting Museum
- Niesky, Landkreis Görlitz
  - Museum at the Zinzendorfplatz
- Nossen, Landkreis Meißen
  - Altzella Abbey Park
  - Nossen State Castle

== O ==
- Obercunnersdorf, Landkreis Görlitz
  - Bockwindmühle Kottmarsdorf
  - Faktorenhaus „Alte Brennerei’‘ and Heimatstuben
  - Friseurmuseum Kottmarsdorf
  - „Schunkelhaus’‘
- Oberlungwitz, Landkreis Zwickau
  - Oberlungwitz Local History Museum
- Oederan, Landkreis Mittelsachsen
  - Gahlenz Village Museum
  - Historic Weaving webMUSEUM
  - Klein-Erzgebirge
- Oelsnitz/Erzgeb., Erzgebirgskreis
  - Mining Museum
- Oelsnitz/Vogtl., Vogtlandkreis
  - Teppich- and Local History Castle Museum Voigtsberg
- Olbernhau, Erzgebirgskreis
  - Museums of the town of Olbernhau
  - Museum Saigerhütte Olbernhau
- Oschatz, Landkreis Nordsachsen
  - Oschatz Town and Coach Museum
  - Gallery at the Museum
- Oybin, Landkreis Görlitz
  - Castle and Monastery, see Oybin (mountain)

== P ==
- Panschwitz-Kuckau, Landkreis Bautzen
  - Cisinski-Memorial
- Pegau, Landkreis Leipzig
  - Museum of the town of Pegau
  - Ziegelei Erbs Technology Monument
- Pirna, Landkreis Sächsische Schweiz-Osterzgebirge
  - DDR Museum Pirna
  - Dampfbahn Sächsische Schweiz
  - Town Museum
- Plauen, Vogtlandkreis
  - Embroidery Machine Museum
- Pobershau, Erzgebirgskreis
  - Show Mine
- Pockau, Erzgebirgskreis
  - Technology Museum Ölmühle
- Polenz, Landkreis Leipzig
  - Heimathaus
- Pulsnitz, Landkreis Bautzen
  - Town Museum
- Pöhla, Erzgebirgskreis
  - Pöhla Visitor Mine

== R ==
- Rabenau, Landkreis Sächsische Schweiz-Osterzgebirge
  - German Chair-making Museum
- Radeberg, Landkreis Bautzen
  - Klippenstein Castle Museum
- Radebeul, Landkreis Meißen
  - Hoflößnitz Historic Vineyard & Saxon Wine Museum (Sächsische Weinbaumuseum)
  - Karl May Museum (Villa Bärenfett)
  - Radebeul Narrow Gauge Railway Museum and Radebeul Heritage Railway
  - DDR Museum Zeitreise
  - Radebeul Local History Museum
  - StadtGallery Radebeul
- Radeburg, Landkreis Meißen
  - Local History Museum
- Rammenau, Landkreis Bautzen
  - Johann Gottlieb Fichte Memorial
  - Staatlicher Castlebetrieb BarockCastle Rammenau
- Reichenau, Landkreis Sächsische Schweiz-Osterzgebirge
  - Illingmühle
- Reichenbach, Landkreis Görlitz
  - Ackerbürgermuseum Reichenbach
- Reichenbach, Vogtlandkreis
  - Neuberin Museum
- Reichwalde/Oberlausitz, Landkreis Görlitz
  - 1. Technische Schauanlage for Kübel- and Geländewagen e.V. (Geländewagenmuseum)
- Reichenbach-Reichenau, Landkreis Bautzen
  - Reichenau/Vogtland Local History Museum
- Reinsdorf
  - Mining and Local History Museum
  - Brewery Museum
- Riesa, Landkreis Meißen
  - Municipal Centre for History and Art
- Rietschen, Landkreis Görlitz
  - Erlichthof
- Rittersgrün, Erzgebirgskreis
  - Saxon Narrow Gauge Railway Museum
  - Technology Museum
- Rochlitz, Landkreis Mittelsachsen
  - Rochlitz Castle Museum
- Rochsburg, Landkreis Mittelsachsen
  - Castle Museum Rochsburg
- Rodewisch, Vogtlandkreis
  - Göltzsch Museum
  - Sternwarte and Planetarium
- Rohne, Landkreis Görlitz
  - Sorbian Heimatstube Rohne (Sorbenstube)
- Rothenburg, Landkreis Görlitz
  - Local History Museum Rothenburg/Oberlausitz
  - Rothenburg/Oberlausitz Aviation Technology Museum
- Roßwein, Landkreis Mittelsachsen
  - Roßwein Local History Museum

== S ==
- Sayda, Landkreis Mittelsachsen
  - Ore Mountain Local History Museum
- Scharfenberg, Landkreis Meißen
  - Local History Museum
- Scharfenstein, Erzgebirgskreis
  - Scharfenstein Castle Experience /Saxony
- Schellerhau, Landkreis Sächsische Schweiz-Osterzgebirge
  - Schellerhau Botanical Gardens
  - Weißeritztal Railway
- Schirgiswalde, Landkreis Bautzen
  - Landessternwarte
  - Local History Museum „Carl Swoboda’‘
- Schkeuditz, Landkreis Leipzig
  - Museum of the town of Schkeuditz
- Schmannewitz, Landkreis Nordsachsen
  - Farm Museum Schmannewitz
- Schmölln-Putzkau, Landkreis Bautzen
  - Local History Museum Schmölln
- Schneeberg, Erzgebirgskreis
  - Museum for Miner's Folk Art (Museum für bergmännische Volkskunst)
  - Technology Museum
- Schmorsdorf near Maxen, Landkreis Sächsische Schweiz-Osterzgebirge
  - Lindenmuseum Clara Schumann in Schmorsdorf, Saxonys kleinstes freistehendes Museum
- Schönbach, Landkreis Leipzig
  - Schönbach Village Museum
- Schönborn-Dreiwerden, Landkreis Mittelsachsen
  - Visitor Mine „Alte Hoffnung Erbstolln’‘
- Schöneck/Vogtl., Vogtlandkreis
  - Schöneck Brewery Museum
  - Local History Museum
- Schönfeld, Erzgebirgskreis
  - Visitor Mine
- Schönfels, Landkreis Zwickau
  - Schönfels Castle Museum
- Schönheide, Erzgebirgskreis
  - MBS Museumsbahn Schönheide e. V. (Narrow Gauge Railroad Museum of Schönheide)
  - Bürsten- und Heimatmuseum (Brush- and Local History Museum)
- Schwarzbach, Landkreis Mittelsachsen
  - Museum for Volksarchitektur and bäuerliche Kultur
- Schwarzenberg, Erzgebirgskreis
  - Schwarzenberg Railway Museum
  - Schwarzenberg Castle Museum
- Sebnitz, Landkreis Sächsische Schweiz-Osterzgebirge
  - Afrikahaus
  - Sebnitzer Artblumen- and Local History Museum „Prof. Alfred Meiche’‘
  - Urzeitpark Sebnitz
- Seifersdorf, Landkreis Meißen
  - Seifersdorf Castle and Park
- Seiffen, Erzgebirgskreis
  - Ore Mountain Open-Air Museum
  - Ore Mountain Toy Museum
- Seifhennersdorf, Landkreis Görlitz
  - Railway Museum – Collection by the Frey Family
  - Doll Museum
  - Karasek Museum
- Sohland an der Spree, Landkreis Bautzen
  - Deutsch-Tschechisches Forstmuseum, Teilbereich Oberlausitzer Forstmuseum
  - Local History Museum „Old Weberhaus’‘
- St. Egidien, Landkreis Zwickau
  - Local History Museum in Gerth-Turm
- Stadt Wehlen, Landkreis Sächsische Schweiz-Osterzgebirge
  - Local History Museum and Botanical Garden
- Steinigtwolmsdorf, Landkreis Bautzen
  - Weifa Local History Museum
- Stolpen, Landkreis Sächsische Schweiz-Osterzgebirge
  - Stolpen Castle
  - Stolpen Town Museum
- Syrau, Vogtlandkreis
  - Drachenhöhle
  - Windmühle

== T ==
- Tannenbergsthal, Vogtlandkreis
  - Visitor Mine „Grube Tannenberg’‘
  - Industrybrache NC-Artlederwerk
- Taucha, Landkreis Leipzig
  - Town Local History Museum
- Tharandt, Landkreis Sächsische Schweiz-Osterzgebirge
  - ForstBotanical Gardens Tharandt
- Torgau, Landkreis Nordsachsen
  - County Museum Torgau
  - 2. Saxon Landesausstellung 2004

== W ==
- Waldenburg, Landkreis Zwickau
  - Local History Museum and Naturalienkabinett
- Waldheim, Landkreis Mittelsachsen
  - Local History Museum of the town of Waldheim
  - Saxon Strafvollzugsmuseum
- Waltersdorf, Landkreis Görlitz
  - Volkskunde- and Mühlenmuseum
- Wartha, Landkreis Bautzen
  - School Museum K.A. Kocor
- Waschleithe, Erzgebirgskreis
  - Show Mine „Herkules-Frisch-Glück’‘
- Weißenberg, Landkreis Bautzen
  - Museum „Alte Pfefferküchlerei’‘
- Weißwasser, Landkreis Görlitz
  - Weißwasser Glass Museum
  - Muskau Forest Railway
- Werdau, Landkreis Zwickau
  - Town and Dampfmaschinenmuseum
- Wermsdorf, Landkreis Nordsachsen
  - Museum Hubertusburg
- Wilthen, Landkreis Bautzen
  - Heimatstube
- Wohlhausen, Vogtlandkreis
  - Hüttels Musikwerk-Exhibition
- Wolkenstein, Erzgebirgskreis
  - Local History Museum
- Wurzen, Landkreis Leipzig
  - Kulturgeschichtliches Museum
  - Town Gallery at the Markt
- Wyhratal, Landkreis Leipzig
  - Volkskundemuseum Wyhra

== Z ==
- Zabeltitz, Landkreis Meißen
  - Zabeltitz Farm Museum
- Zeißholz, Landkreis Bautzen
  - Zeißholz Village Museum
- Zinnwald-Georgenfeld, Landkreis Sächsische Schweiz-Osterzgebirge
  - Vereinigt Zwitterfeld zu Zinnwald
  - Museum Huthaus
- Zittau, Landkreis Görlitz
  - Open-Air Museum Klosterhof
  - Gallery Artlade
  - Historics Stadtarchiv
  - Church and KulturCentre St. Johannis
  - Church zum Heiligen Kreuz
  - KulturHistorics Museum
  - Museum for Natural History des Zittauer Landes
- Zöblitz, Erzgebirgskreis
  - Serpentin- and Local History Museum Zöblitz
  - Schmiede and Heimatstube Ansprung
  - alte Schule Sorgau
- Zschopau, Erzgebirgskreis
  - Visitor mine „Heilige Dreifaltigkeit’‘
  - Local History Museum in Wildeck Castle
- Zwickau, Landkreis Zwickau
  - ArtCollections Zwickau
  - Kultur- and stadtgeschichtliches Museum Priesterhäuser Zwickau
  - August-Horch Museum Zwickau
  - Robert Schumann House
  - Agricultural Museum Castle Blankenhain
- Zwota, Vogtlandkreis
  - Heimatstube Zwota
- Zwönitz, Erzgebirgskreis
  - Gebhardtsche Collection
  - Papiermühle Niederzwönitz
  - Local History Museum Knochenstampfe (in the village of Dorfchemnitz)
