= Ore Mountain Museum =

Museum in Annaberg-Buchholz, Germany

Coordinates: 50°34′42″N 13°00′16″E

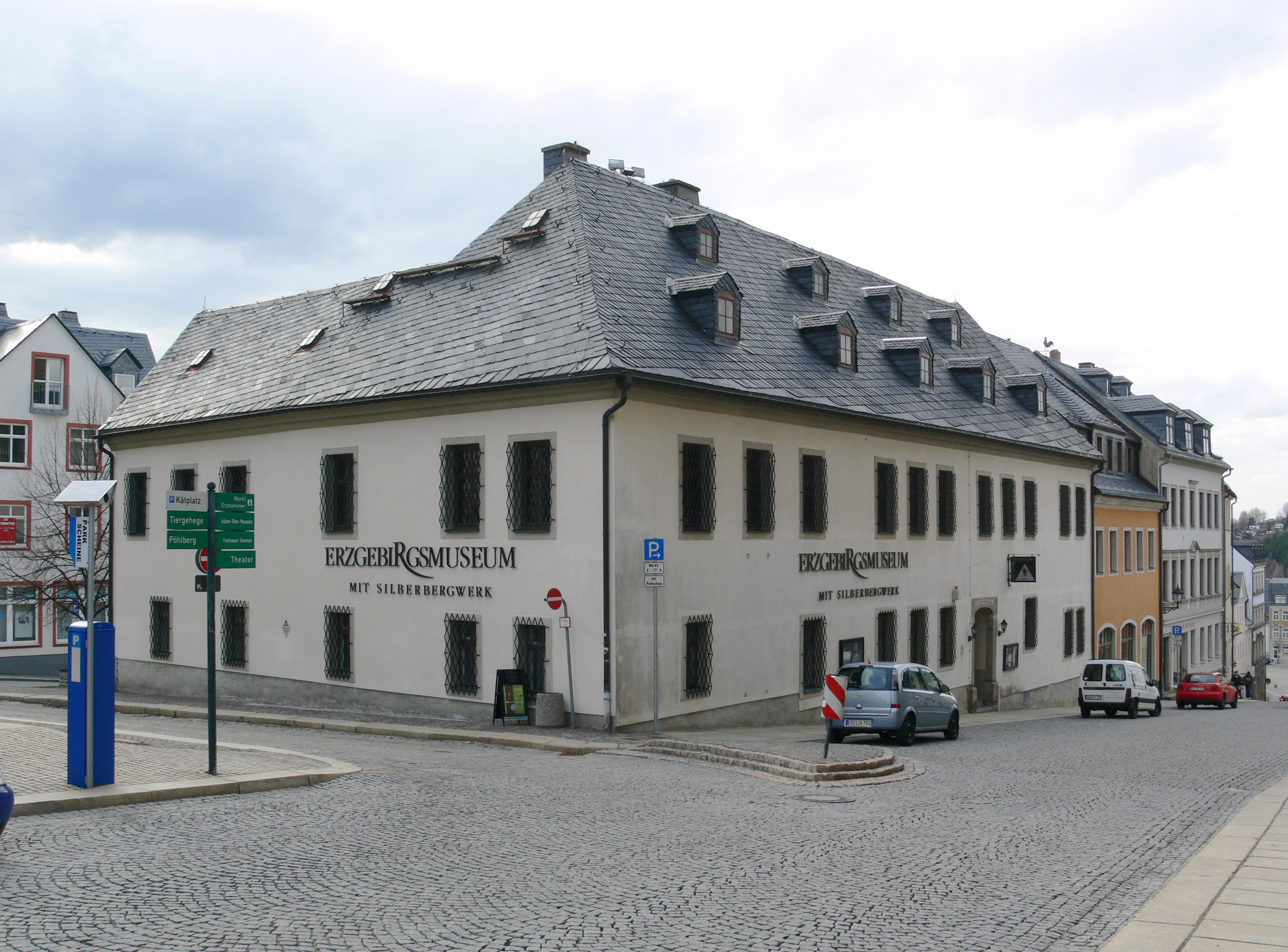
The Ore Mountain Museum on Große Kirchgasse in Annaberg

Ore Mountain Museum, Annaberg-Buchholz, Saxony

The Ore Mountain Museum (German: Erzgebirgsmuseum) is a museum in Annaberg-Buchholz in the German state of Saxony and located in the Ore Mountains of Central Europe. Its display includes examples of Ore Mountain folk art, especially carvings, bobbin work and passements) and gives an insight into the history of the town of Annaberg and of silver mining in the region. The museum also owns a work from the workshop of Lucas Cranach the Younger from 1572 and a large collection of valuable pewter vessels. Adjoining the museum is the visitor mine of Im Gößner.

== History ==
The museum was established in 1887 as the Museum of Ore Mountain Antiquities (Museum erzgebirgischer Alterthümer) and was initially housed in the town hall in Annaberg. The basis of its presentations is formed from the private collections and donations of Annaberg's townsfolk. As a result of the rapid expansion of the exhibition, it moved in 1891 to its present home opposite St. Anne's Church. In 1905, there was an initiative by the Ore Mountain Club, who supported the museum financially and in other ways until 1927, to rename it to the Ore Mountain Museum. The profile of the museum was heavily influenced by its first curator and local historian, Emil Finck.

During construction work in 1992 in the area of the museum a gallery system with many branches was discovered. This was dated to the early days of the silver mining industry in Annaberg around 1500 and, in August 1995, it was opened to the public.

== Publications ==
The museum publishes the Annaberger Museumsblätter ("Annaberg Museum Magazine").

== See also ==
- List of museums in Saxony
