= Dresden Museum of Ethnology =

Museum in Dresden, Germany

Coordinates: 51.0599°N 13.7377°E

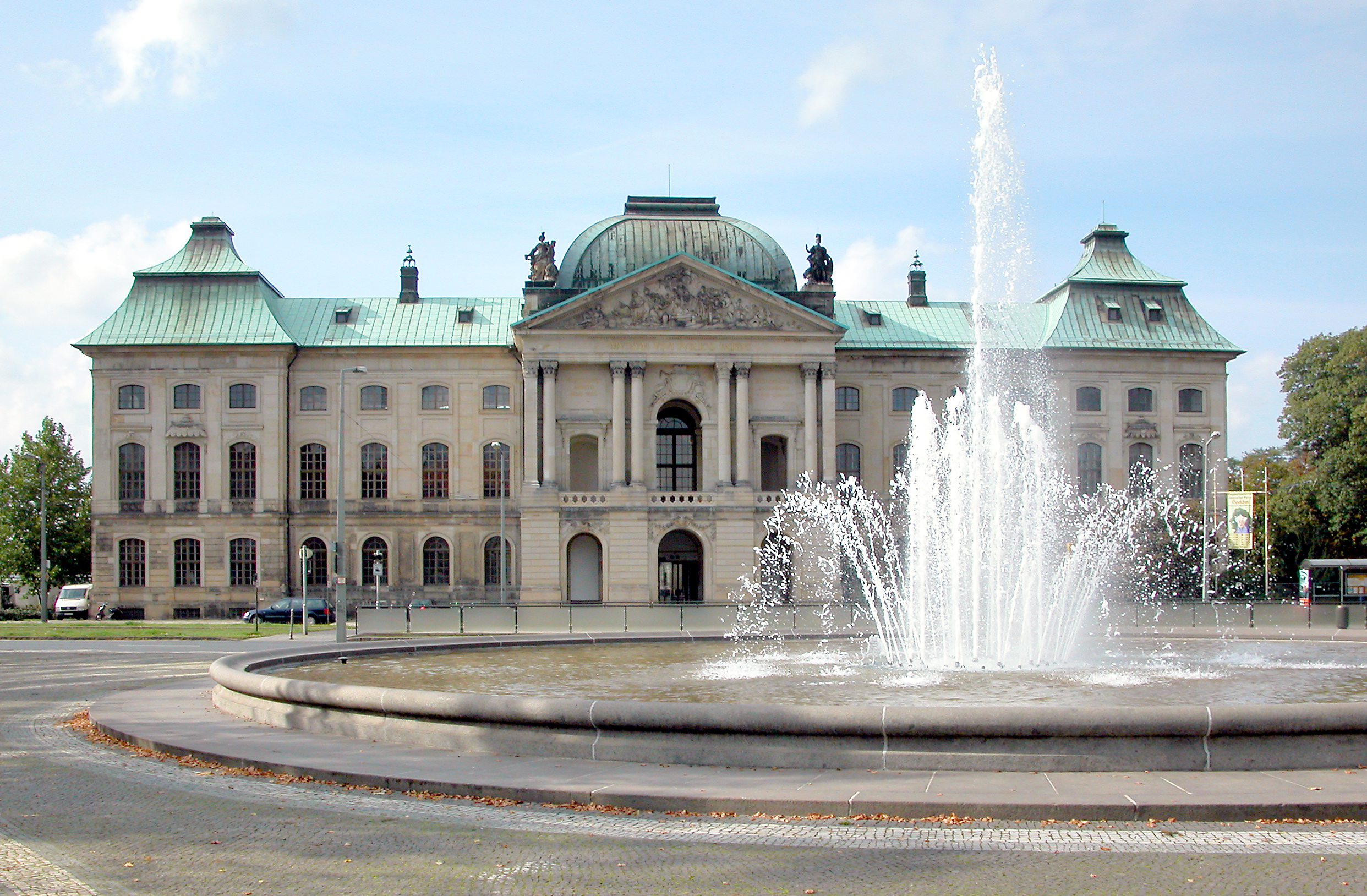
Japanisches Palais which houses the Museum of Ethnology

The Dresden Museum of Ethnology (German: Museum für Völkerkunde Dresden) is an ethnographic museum that is part of the Dresden State Art Collections. It was founded in 1875 and contains a collection with more than 90,000 artefacts from Oceania, Africa, America, Asia, Australia and Europe.

== History ==
The museum originated when the physician and Privy Councillor Adolf Bernhard Meyer founded an ethnographic department within the Natural History Museum in 1875. Three years later, the institution was renamed the Royal Zoological and Anthropological-Ethnographic Museum in acknowledgement of the growing differentiation between the natural sciences and the humanities. The collecting focus at that time was on material evidence from peoples and regions where human development was believed to be discernible. The attitude of the day was influenced by the evolutionary theory of the time. The main area of research and collection during this period was the Indonesian-Oceanic region and the origins of the collection was the cabinet of curiosities established by Augustus, Elector of Saxony in 1560.

Between 1906 and 1936, the ethnological and anthropological collecting activities expanded further. During this period various researchers embarked on several collecting expeditions, including the New Guinea expedition of 1910.

In 1920, the museum was renamed "Museum of Zoology and Ethnology Dresden". It gained additional storage and special exhibition rooms in the orangery building in the Duchess's Garden .

The ethnologist Bernhard Struck became a research assistant at the Museum of Zoology and Ethnology in 1923.

During World War II the majority of the collections were evacuted from Dresden and escaped the wide-scale destruction of the city. As early as 1946, the evacuated collections were returned to the now separate State Museums of Ethnology and Zoology.

The dominant sources for expanding the collection after 1945 were private collections and state-run commerce. However, evidence from regional studies was also added. The cultural policy goal of this period was now the historical documentation of the cultural achievements of the world's peoples.

In 1954, the museum moved into premises in the Japanese Palace

Contributors to the collection include:

- Carl Goffried Semper
- Richard Parkinson
- W. D. Webster

== Current ==
The museum presents continually changing exhibitions in the Japanisches Palais, a Baroque building complex in Dresden, Germany.

== See also ==
- List of museums in Saxony
