= Bienertmühle =

Former mill site in Dresden

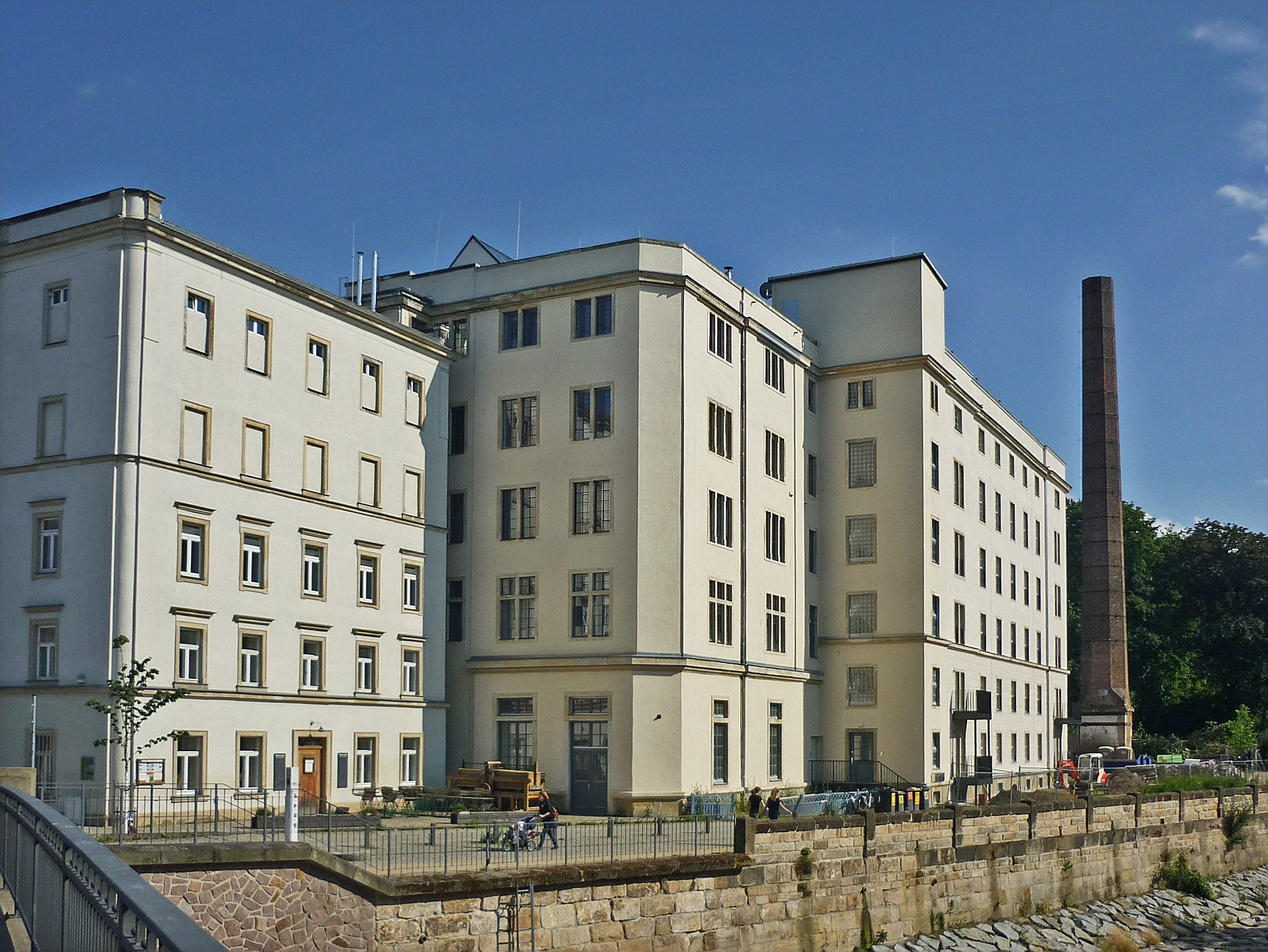
Bienertmühle in summer 2015

The Bienertmühle (also known as the former Hofmühle) is a historic mill site located in the Dresden district of Plauen, Germany, along the Weißeritz River. Originally built in 1568 to replace an earlier mill, the Hofmühle is commonly associated with the Bienert family, particularly Gottlieb Traugott Bienert, who leased the site in 1852 and later purchased it in 1872. Under the Bienert family's ownership, the mill was modernized and became the most advanced milling operation in Saxony.

The mill remained in the family for three generations until its expropriation and nationalization in 1972. Operations continued until a fire in 1990 led to its closure, along with the adjacent bread factory, which shut down in 1991.

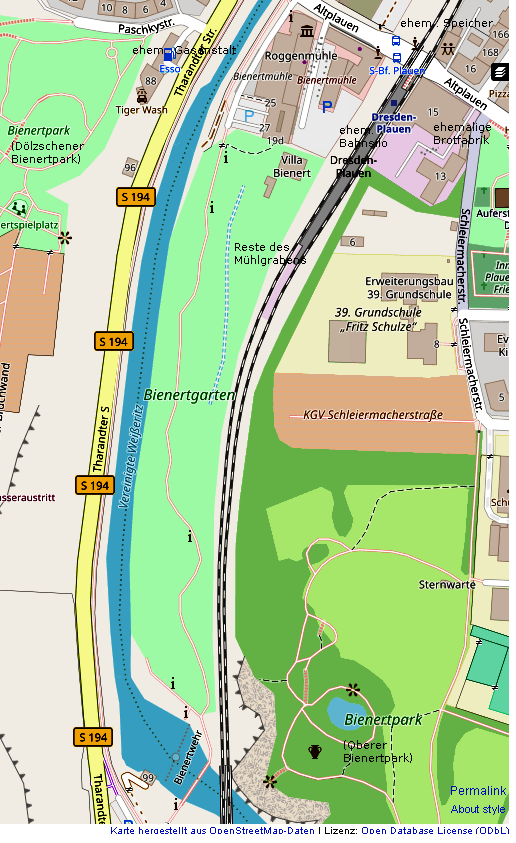
Map of the Bienertmühle in the surrounding area (2018)

In 2006, part of the complex was repurposed to house the Hofmühle Dresden Museum, along with a small mill store and café. Several other buildings on the site are now occupied by various businesses. Since 2014, large sections of the former Bienertmühle have been converted into loft apartments, with completion scheduled for 2021. Additionally, the Bienert family's villa, which had fallen into disrepair, underwent a comprehensive restoration between 2015 and 2018 and was transformed into a residential condominium complex.

== Previous history ==
The existence of a gristmill in the village of Plauen near Dresden has been documented since 1366. On May 17th of this year, a mill at its current location was recorded for the first time in the interest register of the Dresden Kreuzkirche, Dresden. It seems that until approximately 1480, this mill was connected to a sawmill with one, later two, and four grinding gears. It was purchased by the Dresden cloth makers at this time and converted into a fulling mill. Persistent border disputes between the Dresden clothmakers' guild and the municipality of Plauen occupied the ducal governments on several occasions between 1487 and 1528, so that the mill can be documented throughout history. In 1541, it is referenced in a source as "Raths-Walkmühle, situated on the Mühlgraben above Plauen."

== Electoral Court mill ==
=== 1568–1643 ===
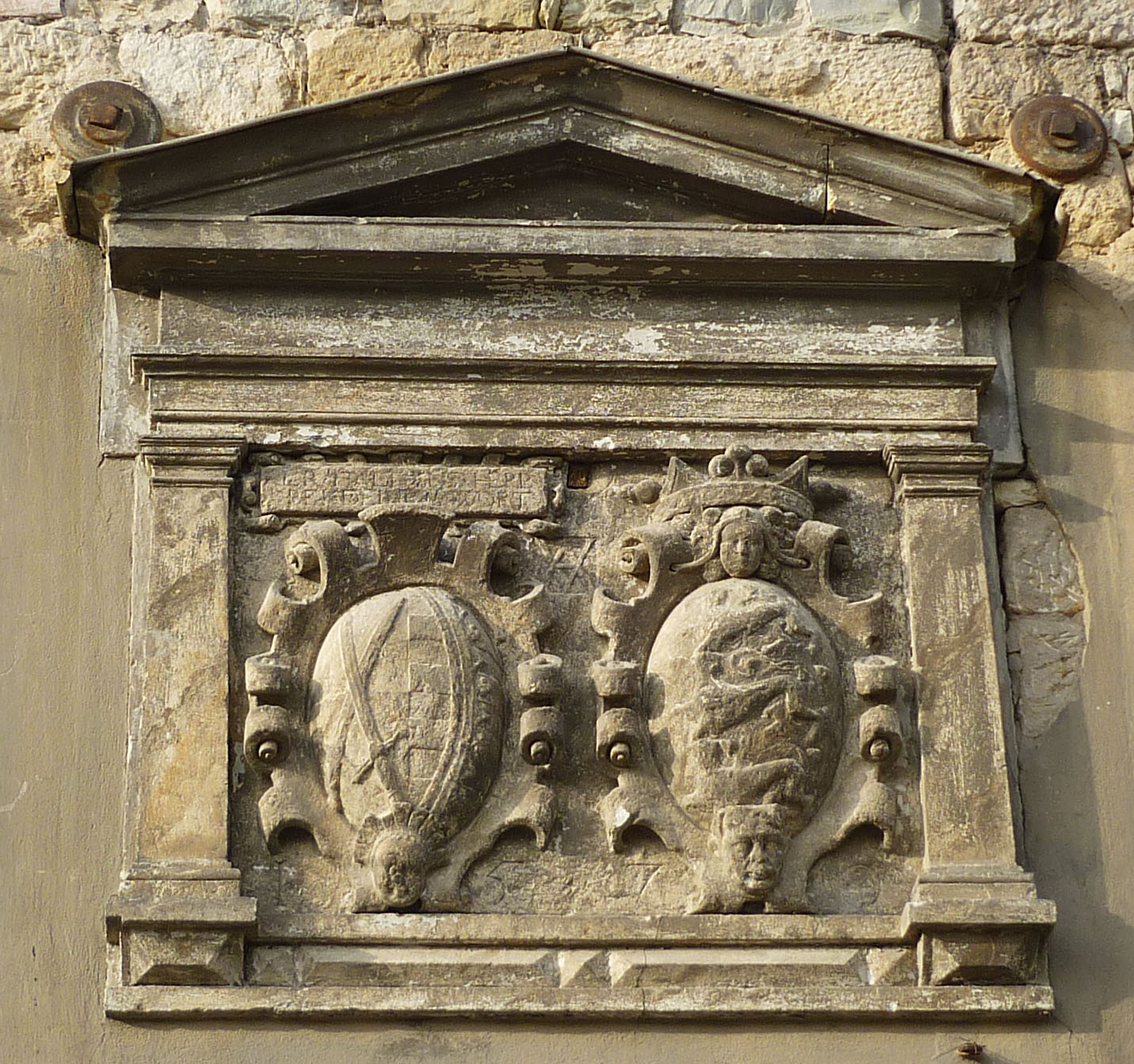
Electoral double coat of arms from 1570 in the courtyard of the Bienertmühle, unrestored. The intertwined double A between the two coats of arms is still recognizable. (2011)

In 1568, the Saxon Elector August purchased the fulling mill with the intention of converting it into a flour mill. A new fulling mill of the guild was constructed with the fulling mill weir on the current site of Hofmühlenstraße, located to the south of the junction with Biedermannstraße. This structure has been documented since this period and was finally removed in the 1970s. In the following year, the Elector had the purchased mill demolished, purchased various additional plots of land, and, at a cost of 8,336 guilders, had a court mill built "in princely splendor," i.e., with 16 grinding gears, by 1571. This was not the only court mill in the country. In 1521, Duke Georg the Bearded constructed a court mill on the Weißeritzmühlgraben, in proximity to the Anne's Church. This mill was known as such until its closure in 1927.

The first miller, Zacharias Zimmermann, is documented for 1570. In order to ensure the profitability of the mill, a rescript of April 6, 1569 introduced compulsory grinding in this mill for 33 Dresden villages (and 210 mill guests), which was extended to 66 villages in 1661. The two mills of the brothers Matthes and Andreas Moyses, which were located near the present Hofmühle, today roughly along Agnes-Smedley-Straße, were demolished and the brothers were compensated with the two official mills in Tharandt in 1573. The mill race, which still partially existed, provided the mill with a usable gradient of 7.6 meters with an average water flow of 2.5 cubic meters of water per second.

The electoral coat of arms in the courtyard is a reminder of this old court mill. The relief stone, one of the oldest individual monuments in Dresden, shows the electoral swords with the Saxon rhombus on the left and three lions under a crown on the right. The latter are taken from the Danish imperial coat of arms and refer to Electress Anne, Augustus' wife, who was instrumental in the economic development of Saxony as a promoter of agriculture. Between the coats of arms are two intertwined monograms with the letter A, both of which commemorate the mill's patron. However, since the Bienertmühle was renovated after 2011, they are almost unrecognizable.

The obligation to grind also had advantages for the farmers, because on the one hand the millrace of the court mill almost always had enough water, and on the other hand the miller was obliged to grind the grain brought in and received a fixed price for it (wage milling): Initially, this was one mead for each bushel of flour (16 meads equaled one bushel), and in 1640 it was increased to a quarter for the court mill. He was unable to make any additional profit from the continuing hardship in the villages.

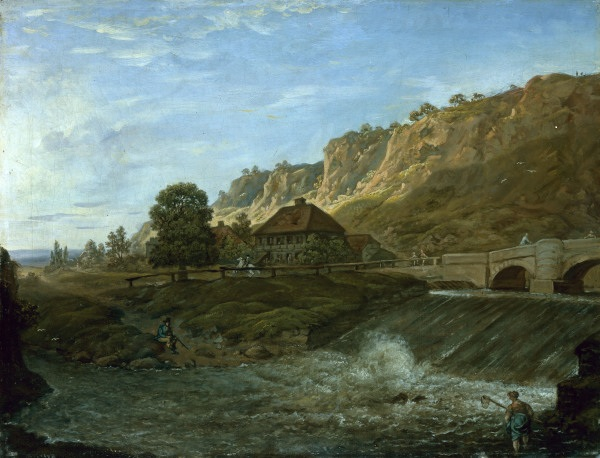
The Hofmühlenwehr (today: Bienertwehr) in an oil painting by Anton Graff (1805). Above the spillway, just to the left of the Hegereiter Bridge, is the raft screen of the millrace inlet.

Since the farmers had to travel long distances, the tenant of the mill was also granted the privilege of serving beer, in return for which he had to deliver a number of pigs to the farm each year. In 1578 a forge was built next to the mill (demolished in 1878). The poor condition of the access roads, especially for the "bourgeois farmers", led to regular complaints and lawsuits. Frequent changes of ownership and flood damage since 1593 are also recorded. For example, in 1617 the " Hofmüller" Peter Junghans donated the baptismal font that still stands in the Church of the Resurrection, and around 1700 the Hofmüller leaseholder Gottlob Gäbler donated the altar (with the exception of the altarpiece, which dates from 1859). The tenant Johann Friedrich Wahl (died 1769) is also known as a patron of the parish.

=== 1643–1852 ===
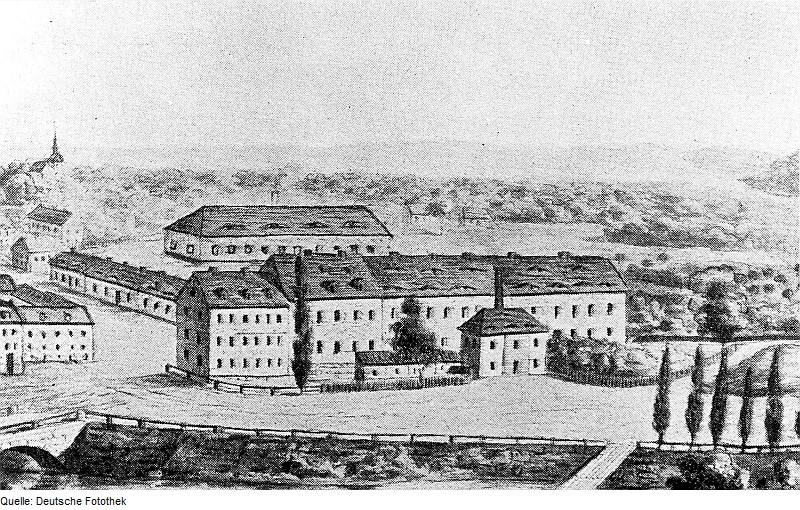
The Bienertmühle around 1825. Behind the mill is the Hegersche Gut (later the site of the Bienert bread factory), the one-story building in the middle is the oil mill that went into operation in 1818, the building to the right is the house of the court miller.

The Hofmühle was not spared the effects of war. During the Thirty Years' War in 1643, General Piccolomini had disposed of the town of Freiberg, gathered his 16,000 troops around Dresden, and chose the village of Plauen and its surroundings as his headquarters. He lived in the Hofmühle from the end of February to March 10, 1643. During the Great Northern War, the Swedes approached Dresden in mid-September 1706 and established themselves in Plauen, where the Hofmühle became their headquarters. They confiscated the flour stored there and intended for the citizens of Dresden, requisitioned the grain stored there and had it ground for themselves. The wheels of the mill that were not needed for this purpose were destroyed. Only the armistice, which came into force at the end of September and led to the Treaty of Altranstädt, prevented even greater damage. In 1809 and 1813 (Battle of Dresden) the then leaseholder suffered from the Napoleonic battles for Dresden.

In spite of the compulsory grinding, the Hofmühle was exposed to increased competition, especially from the Königsmühle, built in 1747, and the Neumühle, built between 1726 and 1728 above the Hofmühle (both also electoral mills, the Neumühle and the Hofmühle with 16 grinding wheels). It was rebuilt in 1776 and received a front length of 92 Ell (about 50 meters) towards the Weißeritz and two "Gestocke" (floors) throughout. The buildings to the left and right of the millrace were made fireproof with fire gables. In 1818 the Brettschneide was replaced by an oil mill with 16 pairs of rams as an extension of the Bienertmühle to ensure profitability. The drive for the oil mill was branched off inside the courtyard mill, reducing the number of available water wheels from 16 to 14.

The abolition or replacement of the compulsory milling between 1840 and 1850 (in this year for the last landowners in Plauen itself) was a profound turning point. The leaseholder Raetzsch had become so inefficient as a result of this and the finer flours with which the Austrian mills tried to conquer the Saxon market, that he had difficulties to raise at least 3000 thalers per year instead of the required 7000 thalers. For this reason, a new lease was granted in 1851, which Gottlieb Traugott Bienert obtained after separating from other businesses, some of which he had established himself (including the Brettmühle in Radeberg, the lease of the Obermühle (Grundmühle Jessen) in Liebethaler Grund, and a bakery in the Radeberg suburb). On May 1, 1852, he took over the now neglected, partly dilapidated mill, which employed only eight people and only four of the original 16 mill wheels were still in operation.

== Bienertmühle ==
=== 1852–1900 ===
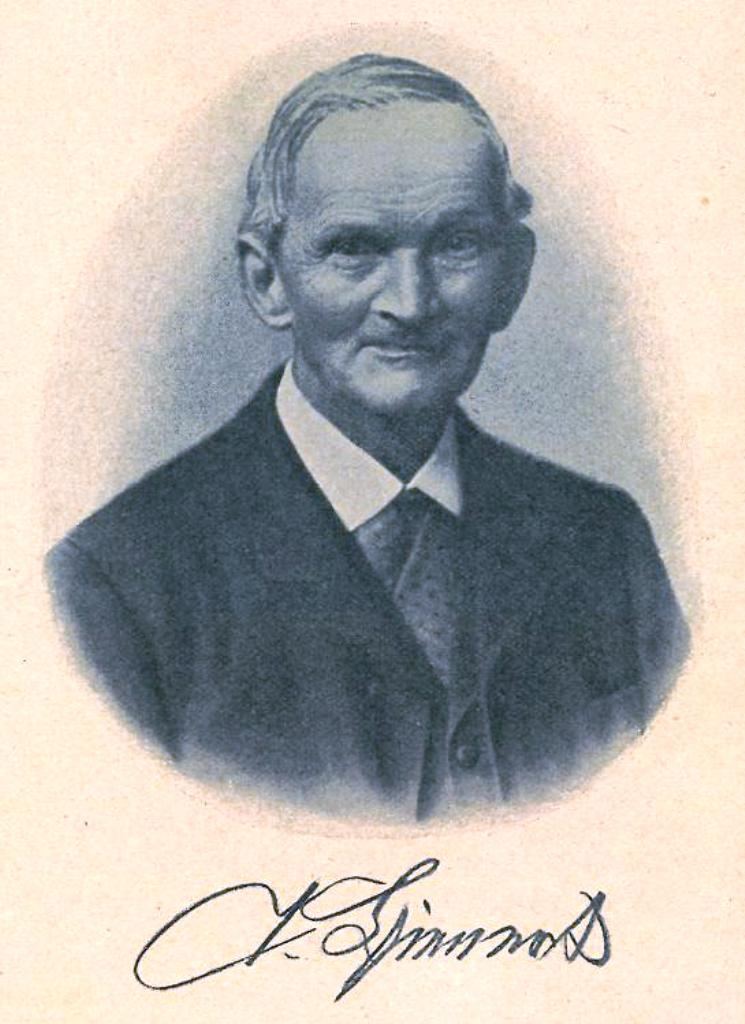
Gottlieb Traugott Bienert (1813-1894), photograph from 1890

Bienert's zeal transformed the Hofmühle from the ground up. This was further expanded in 1872 when, after 20 years of "dogged work" (quote from Bienert), he bought the Hofmühle from the Saxon State Treasury and finally transformed it from an outdated craft business into a modern (for its time exemplary) industrial enterprise. Bienert undertook several educational trips to France, Belgium, Austria, Hungary and Switzerland to learn about the most advanced technologies of the time and to gain experience with them. In addition to Bienert's courage to take healthy risks, the key to his success was his business principle: "The level of production is determined only by demand, not by the performance of the machinery; the aim is to produce impeccable quality, not cheap mass production.

In 1853, Bienert established the first bakery in the Bienertmühle, initially with three coal-fired ovens and rotary ovens. This was a first and significant step away from the previous contract milling (where the miller only received a portion of the flour) towards the bread exchange, which Bienert had already introduced in 1847 in his mill and bakery in Eschdorf: the farmers who delivered their grain immediately received a quantity of bread corresponding to the amount delivered. This had the advantage for the farmers that they were relieved of their own baking work, they could leave the mill immediately (so they did not have to wait for their grain to be ground), and Bienert was relieved of the obligation to feed the waiting people. He was awarded the "Silver Medal of Merit for Agriculture" for this innovation in 1849 and immediately implemented it at the Hofmühle. However, unlike after 1866, the bakery was initially located on the north side of Altplauen Street (these houses were demolished in 1938 when the grain silo was built).

As early as 1853, he replaced the water wheels with a water turbine drive, initially using a Girard turbine, which was later supplemented by another. In 1897 the Bienerts stated the power of both as 70 and 110 e. P. S., i.e. "at the shaft". In the same year, he also introduced the Austrian Hochmüllerei with its permanent sifting (i.e. sieving) and also gained new experience. In 1854, the first Boland kneading machine for the bakery was introduced. Bienert also built silos in the eastern part of the site, which were connected to the railroad after the construction of the Albertsbahn in 1855. In this way, purchased grain could be continuously ground and baked alongside the grain delivered by the farmers: The Bienertmühle thus became a commercial mill.

In 1858, Bienert constructed the inaugural steam engine house situated to the north of the oil mill. This was done in order to ensure the mill's independence from the fluctuating water supply of the Weißeritz, which was dependent on the season and, in some cases, the time of day. The introduction of steam operation for the mill was thus a means of supplementing the water power drive. This was followed in 1861 by the implementation of hydraulic oil press operation for the oil mill. This also augmented the capacity of the oil mill, which was primarily engaged in the production of rapeseed and linseed oil, from 1.25 tons of seed per day in 1852 to 15 tons. However, as a tenant, Bienert was required to obtain permission from the tax authorities.

In 1863, Traugott Bienert constructed a villa for himself and his family on the neighboring plot. The most striking feature of the villa was a large clock located in the gable facing the Hofmühle. The remainder of the property, which extended along the Mühlgraben to the Hegereiterhaus near the Hegereiter bridge, was laid out as a garden.

In 1866, Bienert purchased the adjacent Heger estate to the east. While the estate buildings were initially preserved until 1912, they were subsequently converted into a bakery, with the construction of a flour store in the courtyard. This was subsequently expanded into a floor and silo store, connected to the bakery on the Hofmühlen property by a transportation bridge. Following the construction of the Dresden-Werdau railway line in the area between 1923 and 1927, a tunnel was constructed to connect the two properties.

After twenty years of laborious work, Bienert was able to purchase the Hofmühle for 150,000 thalers on May 1, 1872. This transaction paved the way for him to make further investments. In the following year, he constructed a second steam power station to the south of the oil mill (the chimney of which is a listed building and is still preserved). In 1873, the Reichspost also established a local post office in a building belonging to the Hofmühle, and the following year, a telegraph station was erected. In 1874, Bienert constructed the inaugural gas station, which enhanced the illumination of the mill at night (Paschky-/Ecke Tharandter Straße, currently the site of a petrol station). This facility also supplied gas for street lighting in the village of Plauen, which was first activated on October 19, 1874. In 1875, a telegraph station was established, which was accessible to the general public. In 1875 and 1876, he constructed his own waterworks and installed drinking water pipes for the mill and the municipality of Plauen. The elevated tank necessary for this is still visible today, although in a state of disrepair, situated above an allotment site on Schleiermacherstrasse in the direction of Hoher Stein.

In 1877, the municipality of Plauen succeeded in reorganizing the sewerage and contracted with the City of Dresden to discharge all wastewater (including that from the Bienert Mill) through the main sluice at Falkenstraße (renamed Zwickauer Straße the following year). Bienert took part in the negotiations and also assumed financial obligations for the community so that it could fulfill its contractual obligations to the City of Dresden (the so-called "Falkenstrasse Support Fund").

Bienert introduced roller milling in 1878. In the same year, he had a building erected at the north end of the Hofmühle as a "sales, residential and service building", which was only substantially altered once, in 1901. It also housed the kitchen for the mill workers, which provided 160 meals a day. Since then, the building has been used almost unchanged until 1991, and has remained largely undamaged in the years since. It now houses the Hofmühle Dresden Museum. In 1880, the old oil mill was demolished and a four-story building was constructed to the west of the mill race as a wheat mill. The Mühlgraben itself was vaulted to accommodate the new oil mill and grain washing, while the old part of the building became the rye mill. In 1881, Traugott Bienert finally made his two sons, Theodor (1857-1935) and Erwin Bienert (1859-1930), partners in the business, finally handing over the management to them in 1885 and moving to his villa in the suburb of Radeberg.

In 1895, a technical innovation was the introduction of a rotating coal-fired oven. In 1897, on the occasion of the 25th anniversary of the purchase of the mill and three years after the death of the founder, Theodor and Erwin Bienert published a commemorative volume documenting, among other things, the efficiency of the mill and the bakery. The mill now included a wheat and rye mill, an oil factory with oil refinery and a bakery with ten ovens, as well as a warehouse for 1000 tons and a silo for 500 tons of grain. In 1896, the Bienerts estimated the mill's annual production at about 24,850 tons of wheat, 9,150 tons of rye, 375 tons of corn, 1,885 tons of rapeseed, and 1,440 tons of flax. In 1897 the mill had 269 workers and employees.

"Bienert's social and community involvement was almost avant-garde for his time. (C. Müller) He gave his workers and employees the opportunity to build up a certain amount of wealth. As early as 1855, he established a savings bank for them with favorable interest rates, followed by a widows' fund, a health insurance fund (more than ten years before Bismarck's social legislation), in 1883 a " children's nursery" (kindergarten, Nöthnitzer Str. 4), which still exists today, and in 1887 a pension and assistance fund, which continued to exist as a company pension scheme even after the introduction of statutory pension insurance (1891). The company's own kitchen prepared 160 portions of food every day, and simple bakery products (mainly products of the Bienert Bakery, which did not meet the quality standards) and beverages were available to the workers at reduced prices in the above-mentioned headquarters building, with the Bienert company bearing any deficits. He even took care of the company's social life - for example, there was a Bienert men's choir and an annual company party with a cultural theme, which was organized together with the management. Nevertheless, the daily working time for the millers was (at least) 12 hours, as in other mills of that time.

His commitment to the community - including the provision of drinking water, public gas lighting, the solution of sewage problems, and the first kindergarten - was supplemented by numerous donations, e.g. for schoolbooks and teaching materials, the free provision of building land for new schools and the construction of the new town hall, the financing of bells, and the partial or full assumption of the costs of repairing or building an organ in the Church of the Resurrection. Orphans from Plauen and Eschdorf, his birthplace, each received a savings book with five hundred marks as a confirmation gift, which was maintained until the beginning of the First World War.

=== 1900–1945 ===
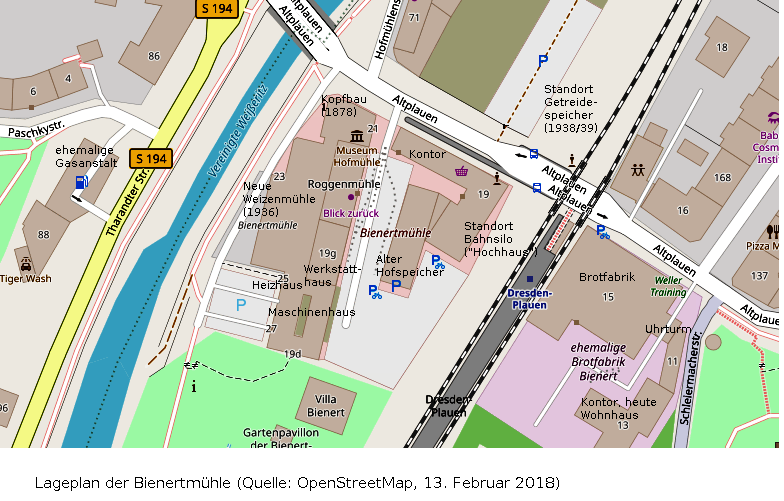

Around 1900, the numerous railroad crossings on the Dresden-Freital section of the Dresden-Werdau railroad line caused increasing problems due to the increase in road and rail traffic. Starting in 1901, plans were made to raise the level of the line and extend it to four tracks in order to eliminate the level crossings and increase efficiency. Around 1910, the Dresden Main Station-Dresden-Plauen section was upgraded to four tracks. For the Bienertmühle site, however, these plans meant that expansion options were now limited. From then on, the Bienert brothers planned to build a new mill near the port, since much of the grain (especially durum wheat) was delivered by water.

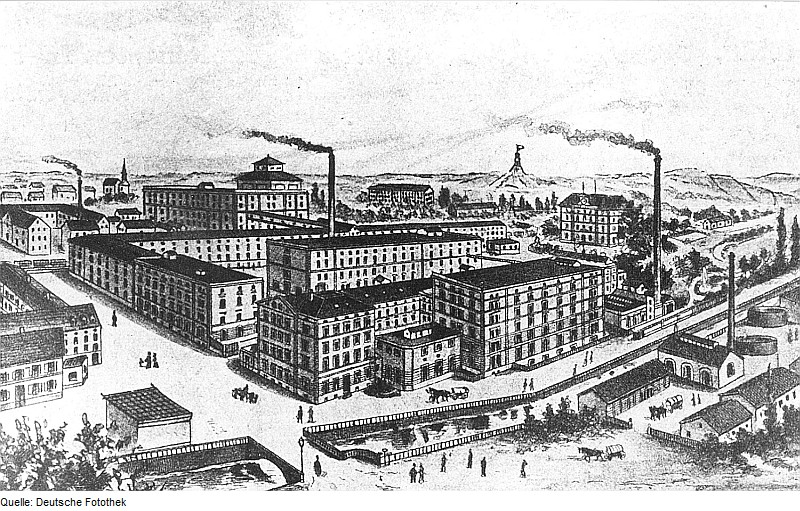
The entire Bienertmühle site in 1907 (slightly idealized depiction). In the foreground on the right, the gasworks shortly before its demolition

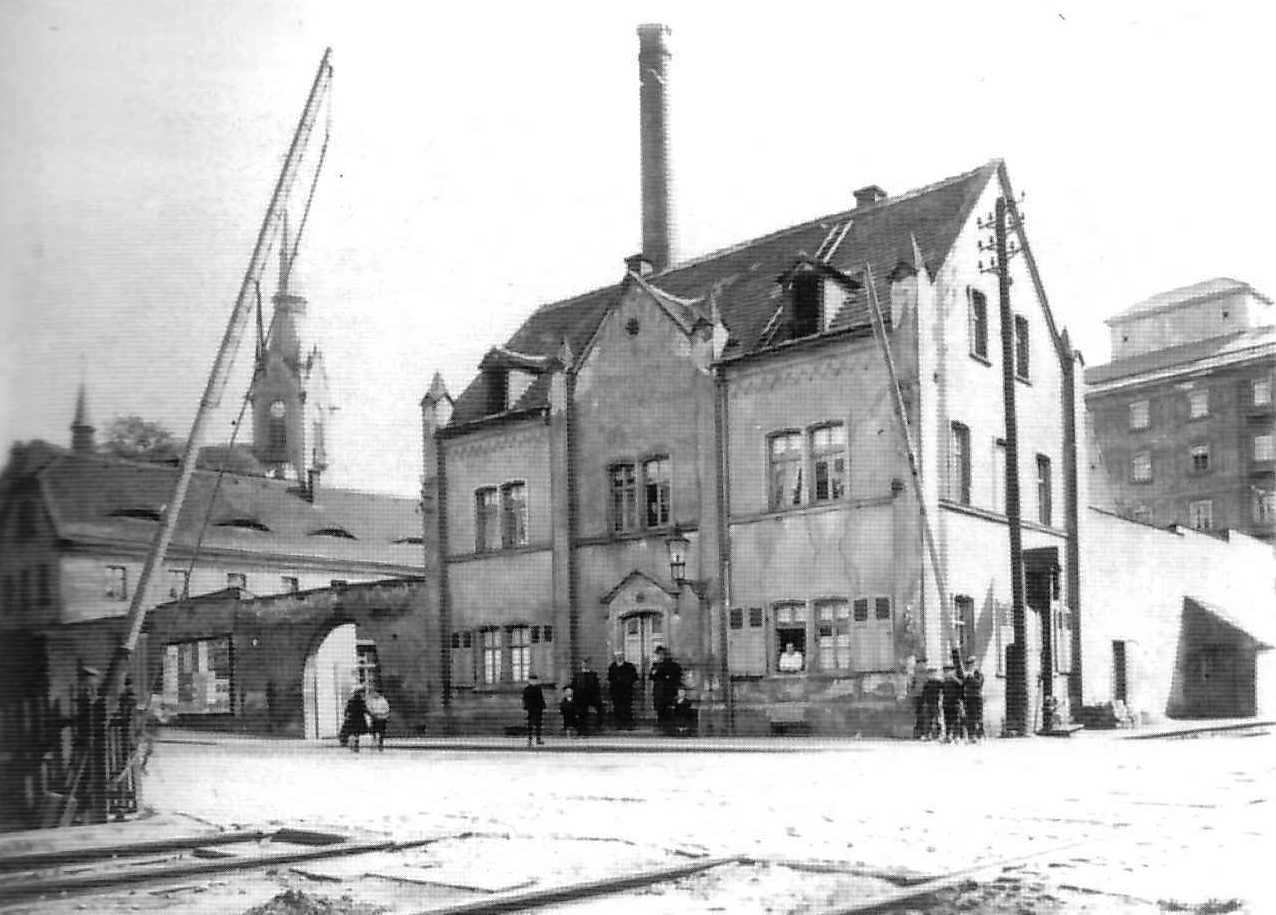
Bienert bread factory (former Hegersche estate). On the left in the background is the tower of the Church of the Resurrection, on the right in the background at the edge of the picture is the old silo building. The Dresden–Werdau railway line runs at ground level over the Altplauen road

In 1902, streetcar service began on the Plauen ground track, which ran between Altplauen and the then Plauen railroad station on Potschappler Straße (later known as "Alte Dresdner Straße") to the right of the Weißeritz, along the Bienertmühle and after a sharp bend over the Hegereiter bridge (until 1921, when it was moved to the left of the Weißeritz). This prompted Theodor Bienert, who lived in the Bienert Villa - Erwin Bienert lived in the Bienert Villa southwest of the Würzburger/ Kaitzer Straße junction (now part of Dresden University of Technology) - to fundamentally redesign the Bienert Garden. He enlisted the services of horticultural architect Max Bertram, who equipped and redesigned it with grottos, fountains and an arbour attached to Hochplauen's water house. The Bienerts took advantage of the raising of Potschappler Straße in the area of the Mühlgraben inlet to renew the still-existing yard mill weir from 1569 below the Hegereiter bridge and to redesign the water inlet into the Mühlgraben (the keystone T. B. 1902 can be seen at the original location). The garden was given a wrought-iron fence, and after the road was moved to the left bank of the Weißeritz, it was partially extended to the river (some of it still exists) and the passages were closed to the public.

On January 1, 1903, Plauen was incorporated into Dresden. In this context, the Bienerts sold the gasworks to the city of Dresden for 900,000 Reichsmark and the waterworks for 450,000 Reichsmark. After the incorporation of Plauen into Dresden, the Dresden fire department was now responsible for fire-fighting. In the course of improving fire protection and due to the fact that the new district no longer had its own fire station, a sprinkler system had to be installed in the mill. In order to provide the necessary amount of water and the required pressure, a fire-fighting water pond was built at Hoher Stein. However, Erwin Bienert donated 80,000 square meters of land and 30,000 Reichsmark to create a park ("Oberer Bienertpark") with a bastion ("Forsthausbastion") as a vantage point in order to develop this and the surrounding area, also as a replacement for the Bienert Garden, which was no longer accessible to the public. This was opened to the public in 1906. After the mill was closed, the extinguishing water pond, which had become a hazard, was removed in the 2000s and the area was renaturalized.

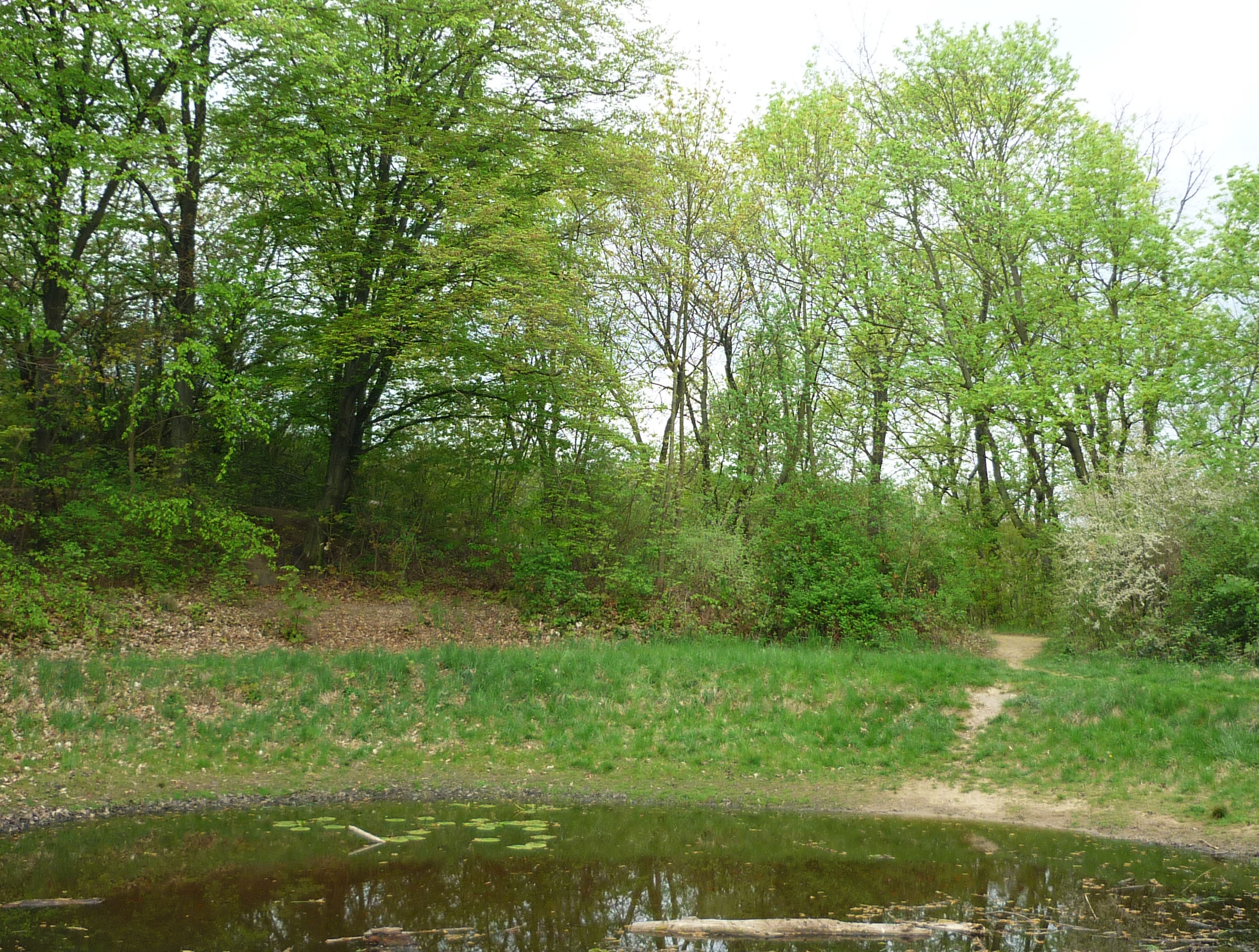
Former fire water pond in Oberer Bienertpark after renaturation (2015). Until the 2000s, it consisted of a concrete basin that reached as far as the surrounding path.

After the closure of the Ratsstein quarry in this area and the dismantling of the gasworks, another Bienert park was created on this site in 1905 ("Dölzschener Bienertpark"), which was also designed by the garden architect Max Bertram. Theodor Bienert donated 40,000 Reichsmark for this park. Both Bienert parks were renovated with EFRE funds in 2006, and the Dölzschner Bienertpark was expanded according to Bertram's original plans. A section of the building along the Weißeritz River was extended again in 1907, adding four storeys. It now housed the engine house of the Bienertmühle.

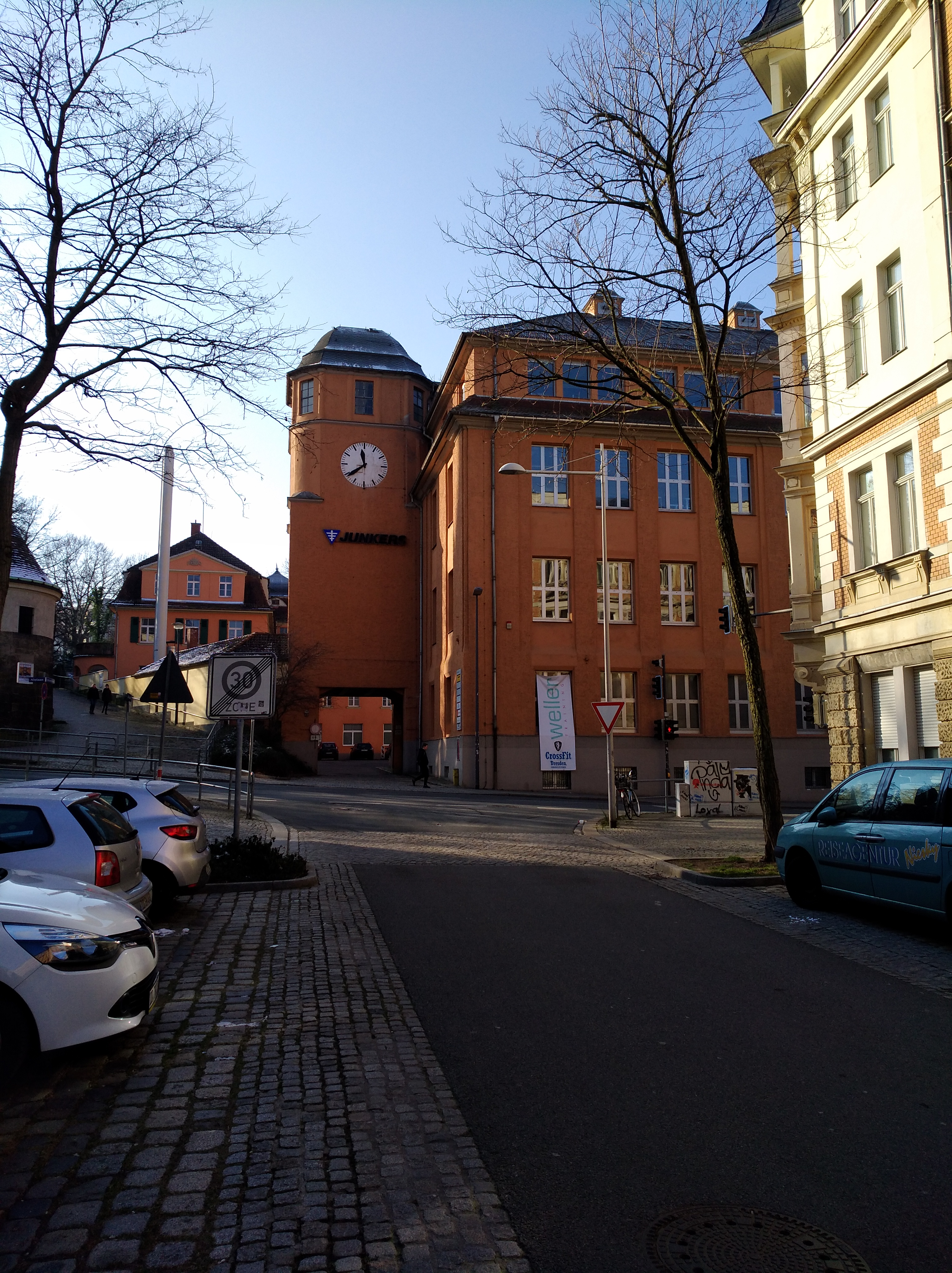
Former bread factory of the Bienertmühle, renovated clock tower from 1915

In 1913, the second part of the business was opened with the Hafenmühle in Dresden's Friedrichstadt. The Bienerts then built a modern industrial bakery in Plauen on the site of the former "Hegersche Gut" estate east of the railroad tracks. Some of the old mill buildings as well as the residential buildings Altplauen No. 11-15, which also belonged to the former Hegersche Gut, had to be demolished for the construction. The striking building with the clock tower was built between 1913 and 1918 in reinforced concrete at the entrance to Schleiermacherstraße. It housed several baking ovens, bread rooms, and warehouses and sheds for the company's fleet of vehicles. The architect was Carl Schümichen, and the construction was carried out by the Plauen-based company Gebrüder Fichtner and the concrete construction company Dyckerhoff & Widmann.

The First World War initially halted the mill's success. The import of grain had almost come to a standstill and many workers were drafted. They "had to be replaced by people from outside the company, some of whom were less suitable", according to the records of W. Arndt, who later became chief engineer at Bienert-Mühlen.

In 1915, the night baking ban was introduced, which meant that no baking was allowed between seven in the evening and seven in the morning. For the bread factory's new two-shift operation, the twelve-hour shift system that had been in place until then was replaced by an eight-hour shift system.

After World War I, the political changes did not leave the Bienert mills unscathed, even though the Bienert name had always stood for social commitment. According to one report, the Bienerts "have always had the warmest sympathy for their employees and have always endeavored to help them in all emergencies". Nevertheless, even during the November Revolution of 1918, when strikes broke out everywhere, workers in the Bienert mills walked off the job. The mills had an enemy: Court Councillor Johannes Alfred Pleißner (1854-1945), authorized signatory and chief engineer, who on the one hand used a rough tone of voice, but on the other hand attached great importance to accuracy. But Pleißner was also the man who was hailed as a pioneer of modern technology. Nevertheless, the desire to strike was never as pronounced in Bienert's mills as it was, for example, in the Dresden metal industry.

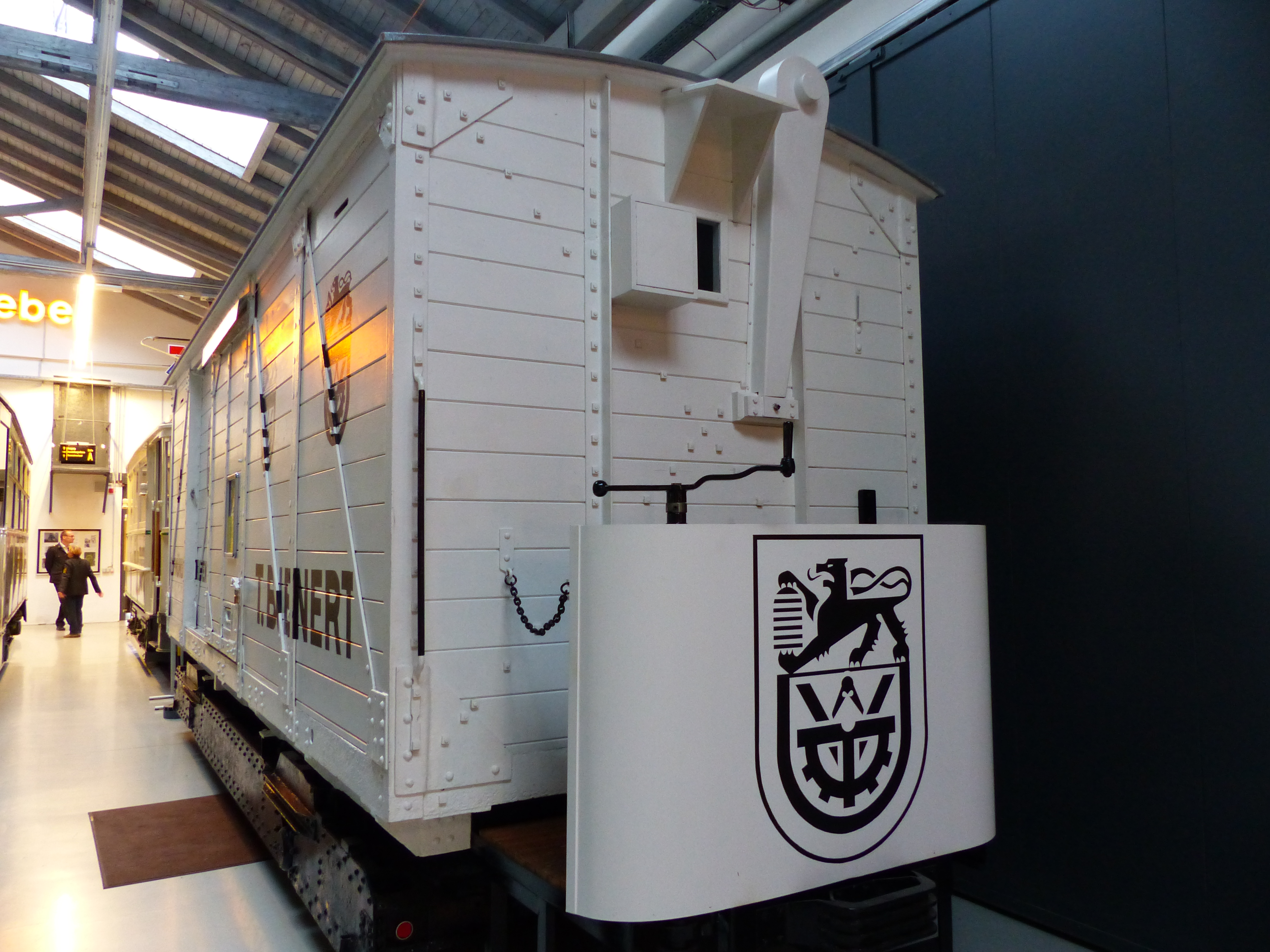
One of the Bienert transport cars, built in 1921, in the Dresden Tram Museum (2015)

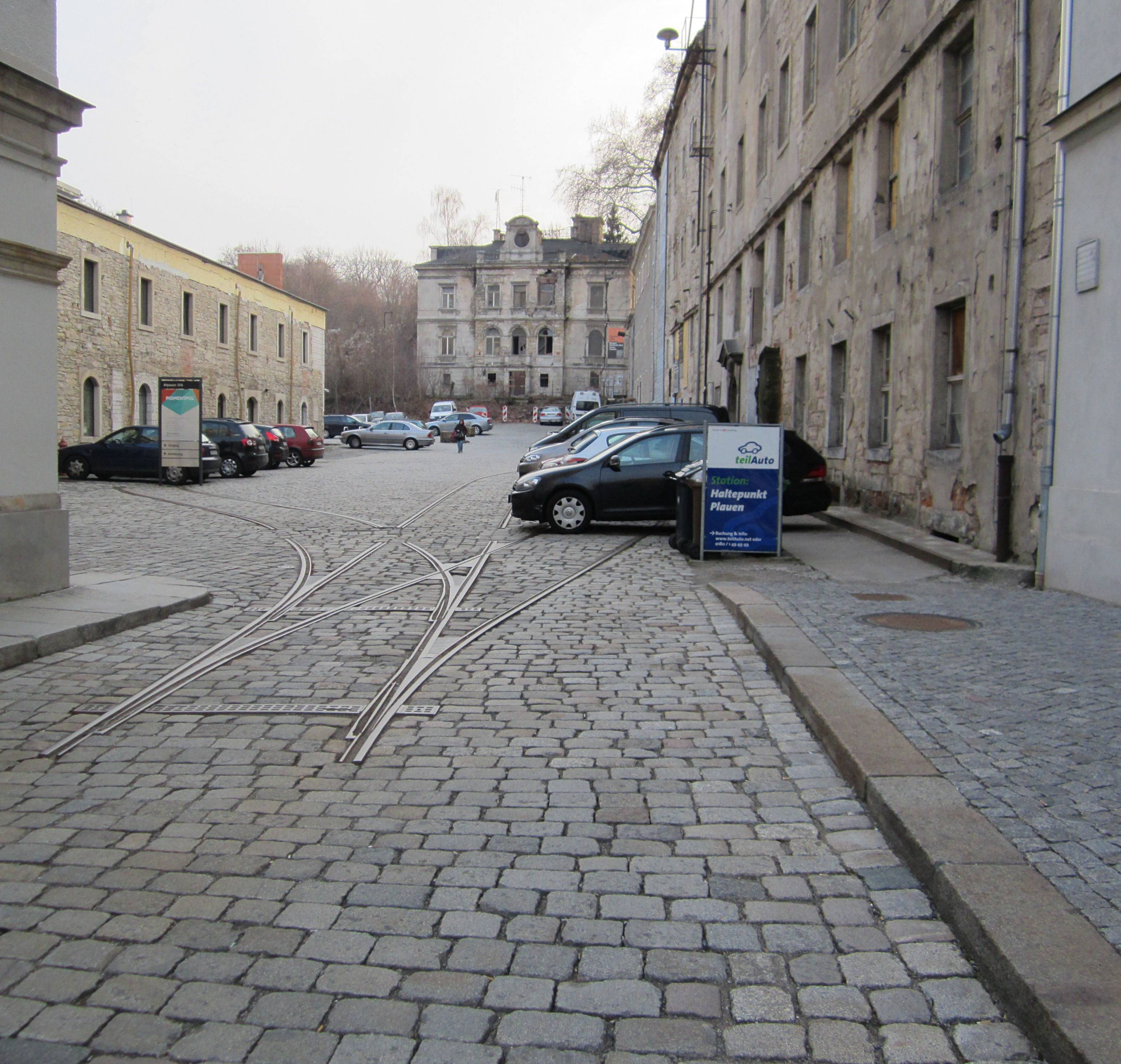
Remains of the tramway siding at Bienertmühle

In 1923, work began on raising the railroad in the Plauen area, which was completed in 1927. This prompted the Bienerts to reorganize transportation between the two mills, which until then had been by horse-drawn wagon and time-consuming railroad trips. In the same year, tram tracks were laid in the yards of both the Bienertmühle and the Bread Factory (as well as a connection from Magdeburger Straße to the Hafenmühle), and from that point on, transportation was also provided by tram cars. In 1926, the Dresden tramway took into service a rebuilt freight car and three rebuilt freight trailers, which were used exclusively for transporting grain and flour between the two mills and the bread factory, and were approved for 15 tons of freight each. These tram transports with their distinctive white paint and Bienert lettering continued until the early 1960s. From Altplauen Street, the entrance to the Bienertmühle yard was directly behind the bridge over the Weißeritz River, which is still visible with remnants of the tracks; immediately after the railroad bridge, the tracks branched off to the bread factory. Most of the track remains were removed in the 1990s, but short sections of track can still be seen in the yard.

The body of one of the three sidecars, that of the Bienert sidecar 3301 built in 1921 and converted for these transports in 1926 (number according to the 1947 numbering plan), was preserved as a bicycle shed in the grounds of the Coswig depot from 1965. Members of the Dresden Tram Museum recovered it in 1996 when the depot was disbanded and refurbished it until 2007. It can be rolled and is part of the Dresden Tram Museum's collection of museum vehicles.

In 1928, after the railroad was raised, a railroad silo was added to the now elevated siding. The wheat mill was enlarged in 1936 ("New Wheat Mill"). In 1938/1939 the silo building with a storage capacity of 5000 tons was built north of the Altplauen road (demolished in 2012). With the exception of the demolition of the railway silo after 1945, these were the last external changes until 1990. In 1925, a "test baking line" was set up in the bread factory, which existed until the end of the bread factory and was used for quality assurance and improvement.

In December 1927, the next generation of the family took over the company: The brothers Erwin and Theodor Bienert handed over the management of the company to Friedrich Bienert (1891-1969), a grandson of the founder and son of Erwin Bienert and his wife Ida, and to Dr. Franz Herschel, a son-in-law of Theodor Bienert. Both had previously worked for the company. However, while Friedrich Bienert, who was still married to Gret Palucca at this time (until 1930), belonged to the German Democratic Party and supported both the CPG-affiliated Rote Hilfe Deutschlands and the "Society of Friends of the New Russia", his cousin Franz Herschel was already an active member of the NSDAP at this time and was dubbed the "Herrenreiter" by the workers behind closed doors due to his appearance. In 1934, both became managers of the Bienert company.

During the air raids on Dresden, damage to the mill and bread factory was limited. From the raids of February 13-15, 1945, the following is documented: an aerial mine hit in the so-called "high-rise building" (as the railroad silo of 1928 was called), which caused considerable damage to the two top floors; a bomb hit in the bread factory, which destroyed the eighth oven and the ceiling panels; and air pressure damage in the area of the boilers, generators, and mills. W. Arndt's report concluded: "The most important parts of the factory ... were substantially undamaged." One worker was killed. According to W. Arndt, at least the bread factory continued to operate until almost the end of the war.

=== 1945–1990 ===
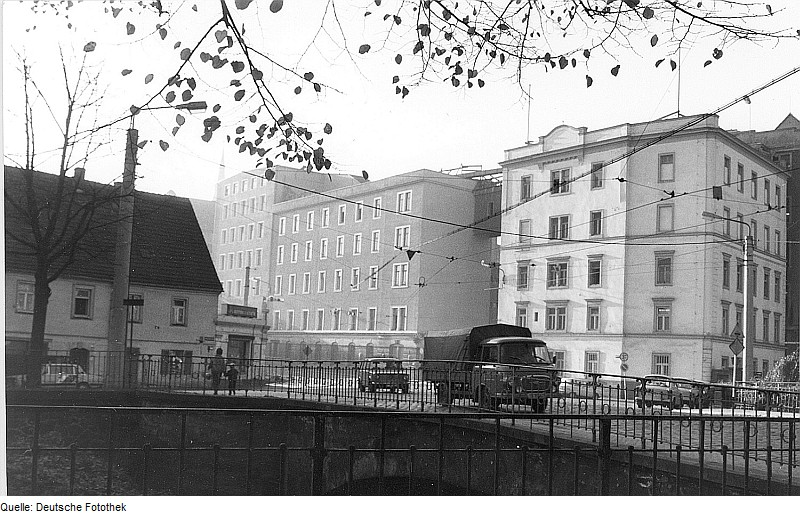
Head building and office building of the Bienertmühle on Altplauen Street as seen from the Weißeritz bridge (1986)

On May 8, 1945, the Red Army entered Dresden and took over the protection of the Hofmühle; the aforementioned engineer W. Arndt was appointed manager and organized the resumption of operations. From then on, however, the mill and bakery were primarily used to supply the Soviet occupying forces. Grain was delivered from the Soviet Union. For the general population, the main activity at first - even with the provisional facilities - was husking, i.e. processing barley into pearl barley and groats, and barley and oats into flakes. This changed in 1948, when the first wheat was delivered from the Soviet Union for processing for the population.

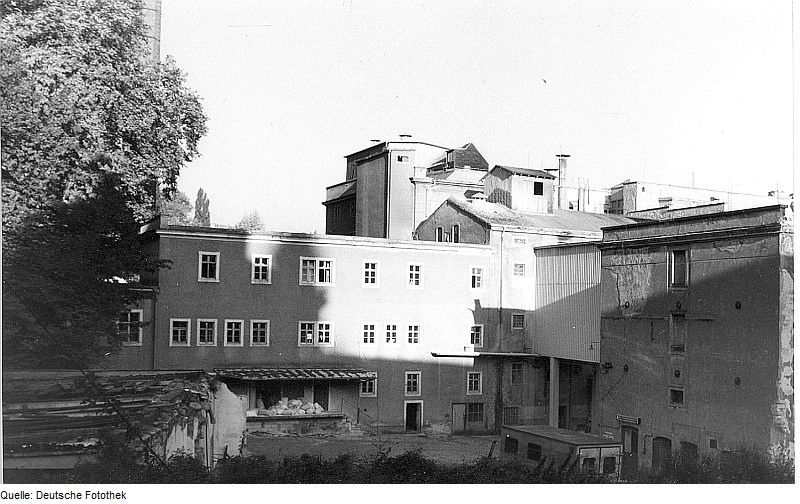

Despite his well-known anti-Nazi stance, Friedrich Bienert fled with his wife in April 1945 behind American lines through Czechoslovakia to Regensburg. Franz Herschel was different: he stayed in Dresden and was arrested on July 15, 1945 as a Nazi economic leader. He died on a prisoner transport to Moscow at an undisclosed location. In 1946, Friedrich Bienert was classified as an opponent of the Nazi regime because of his "demonstrable anti-fascist stance ... and support of membership in the 'Rote Hilfe'" and returned to Dresden in November 1946 after several requests. He lived in part of the Bienert Villa in the Hofmühle, where a rehearsal and concert room was set up for his second wife, the concert pianist Branka Musulin. However, it was not until November 1948 that the forced administration of the mills was lifted and the two mills and the bread factory were returned to him and his family. However, he must have realized relatively soon after the founding of the GDR that it would be impossible to run the mills privately in the long term under its economic policies. In 1952, Friedrich Bienert finally fled to West Berlin, where he lived in modest circumstances until his death in 1969.

- After Bienert's escape, the mills were initially taken over in trust, but on May 1, 1958, the Bienert business was transformed into a state-owned company, "BSB T. Bienert Mills and Bread Factory". The distribution of assets in 1963 was as follows:
- State shareholder: 13.4 %,
- private and fiduciary: 86.6 %, of which:
- Ve share, formerly Theodor Bienert: 1/6 ("Ve" here is "Public property"),
- Ida Bienert: 1/4,
- Ve share, formerly Friedrich Bienert: 1/12,
- M. L. Seidler: 1/12,
- Dr. W. Ruppé: 1/24,
- Margret Ruppé: 1/24,
- Dr. G. Schreiner: 1/6,
- Esther Herschel: 1/6.

By the time of nationalization, the state's share in the Bienert mills had risen from 58.3% (1967) to 72.3% (final balance on April 23, 1972) as a result of investments. The profits of the private owners living in West Germany were paid into blocked accounts and thus remained in the GDR. Exactly 100 years to the day after Traugott Bienert bought the Hofmühle, the GDR expropriated the Bienert family on May 1, 1972 and transferred the entire business into public property. It now operated under the name "VEB Dresden Mills and Bread Factory".

In 1975, the state reorganized the company. The "VEB Dresden Mills and Bread Factory" (i.e. the entire Bienert company including the port mill) was split up: The Bienert bread factory in Plauen became part of the "VE Bread Combine Dresden", the Bienert mill was now operated as "VEB Dresden Mills, Part I", the Bienert port mill as "VEB Dresden Mills, Part II". The former "VEB Dresden Mills", which had been created in 1951 by the nationalization of the "König-Friedrich-August-Mills AG" (renamed "Dölzschner Mills AG" in 1946), now operated under the name "VEB Dresden Mills, Part III" with the addition of the mills in Freital, Heidenau, Niesky, and Meissen.

After the transfer to public ownership, the first of the four bread-baking lines in the bread factory was extended and replaced, and later a fifth was added as the entire production facilities were renewed over the years. Baking was carried out 24 hours a day in three shifts, as it had been before the ban on night baking was introduced in 1915. In 1989, production was around 80 to 85 tons per day (compared to around 45 tons per day in 1918).

Photos show that the railroad silo of the Bienertmühle from 1928 was demolished after 1945 without replacement.

In 1988, a dust explosion occurred in the mill, which led to a relatively quickly extinguished fire in the mill's 1930s technology. The mill was subsequently shut down. It is currently impossible to determine whether the mill was restarted in 1990, when ownership was transferred to the Treuhand, or whether the mill's century-old operation had already come to an end during the GDR era.

== Processing and new development since 1990 ==
=== 1990–2002 ===
After reunification in 1990, the two Bienert mills, together with the Freital Egermühle, were transformed by the Treuhand into the "Dresdener Mühlen GmbH". During the ultimately successful negotiations with the Plange mills and Wilh. Werhahn KG as their owners, it became clear that only the Bienert Hafenmühle could be retained as a mill site. The Bienertmühle, which had been damaged by fire in 1988 and had since fallen into disrepair, was finally closed down by the Treuhand in 1990, ending the history of the mill at this location after more than 600 years.

The Bread Combinate was also broken up into individual companies in 1990: The Treuhand transformed the combine's Dresden operations, the Bienert bread factory and the Pirna plant into " Dresden Bread and Confectionery Products GmbH". In 1992, the company was renamed "Dresden Bread and Confectionery GmbH & Co. The Dresden company was bought by Lieken Urkorn from Achim as "frisch Back Dresden GmbH" with headquarters in Altplauen. Shortly after the takeover by Lieken, however, all parts of the company, including the Bienert bread factory (and thus also the headquarters of "frisch back"), were closed, partly demolished and the employees made redundant.

The striking mill complex was threatened with extensive demolition in the 1990s. A Munich-based investor purchased the complex and planned extensive new construction. The mill, now a listed building, and the Bienert villa were to be demolished. This did not happen, however, due in part to restitution claims by the Bienert heirs.

=== Present ===
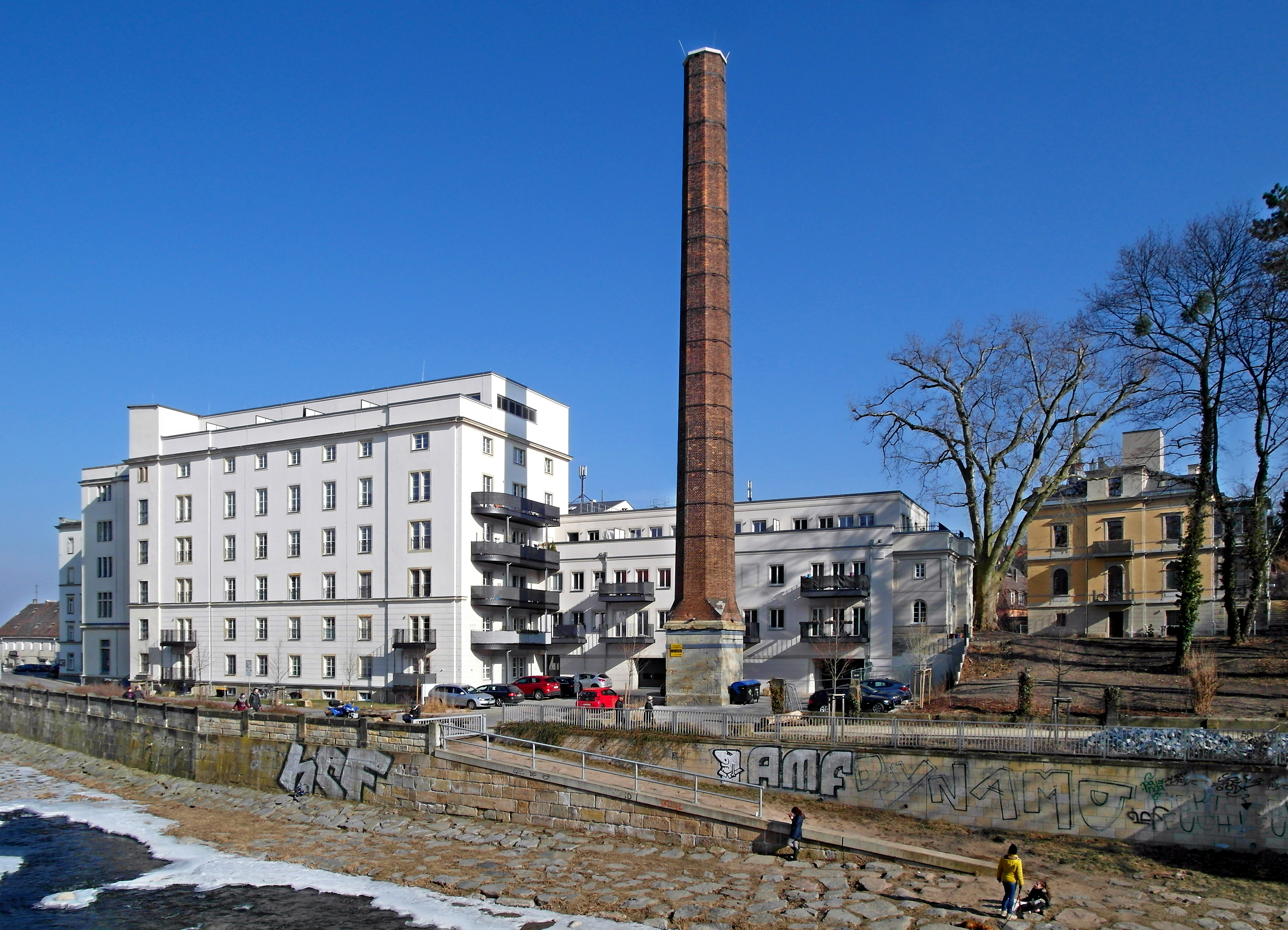
Hofmühle/Bienertmühle with Bienert-Villa 2018

Through various intermediaries, a foundation was successfully registered as the owner. After the Weißeritz flood in 2002, the rescue of the entire ensemble, which is now a listed building, began and the final restoration work was to be completed in 2018, with the remaining work continuing until 2020.

In 2006, the Hofmühle Museum opened an exhibition on the history of the Bienertmühle and the city of Plauen in the main building of the mill complex on Altplauener Straße, built in 1878, as well as a small mill shop with a café in the former factory outlet. In addition, there is an exhibition of historic chocolate moulds from the Plauen company Anton Reiche and the life of Gret Palucca, dance teacher and wife of Friedrich Bienert from 1924 to 1930. The preserved mill technology from the 1930s can also be seen here. Temporary exhibitions and events are regularly held in the other rooms.

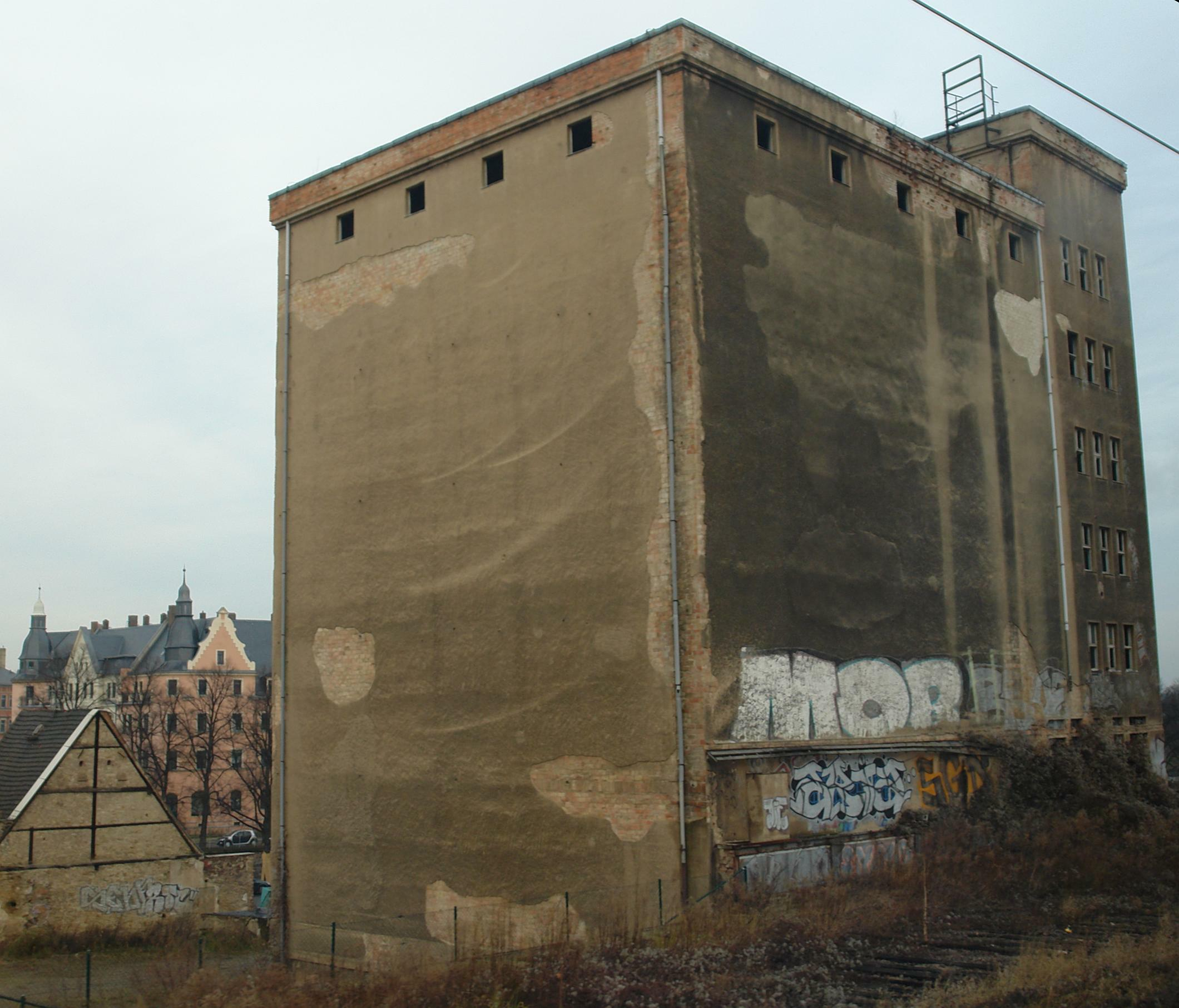
Bienertmühle granary (2009), demolished in 2010, last remains removed in 2012.

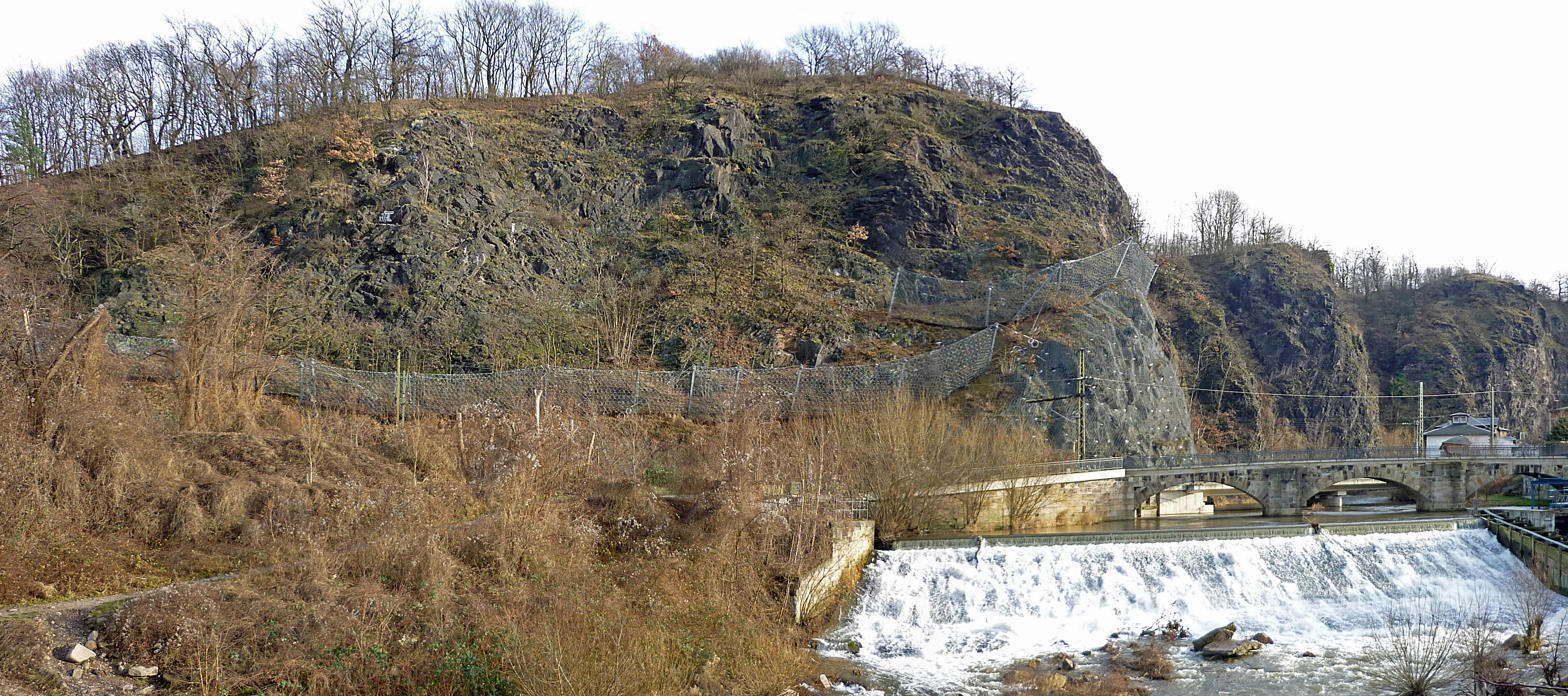
The weir of the Bienertmühle (Bienert weir, 2015)

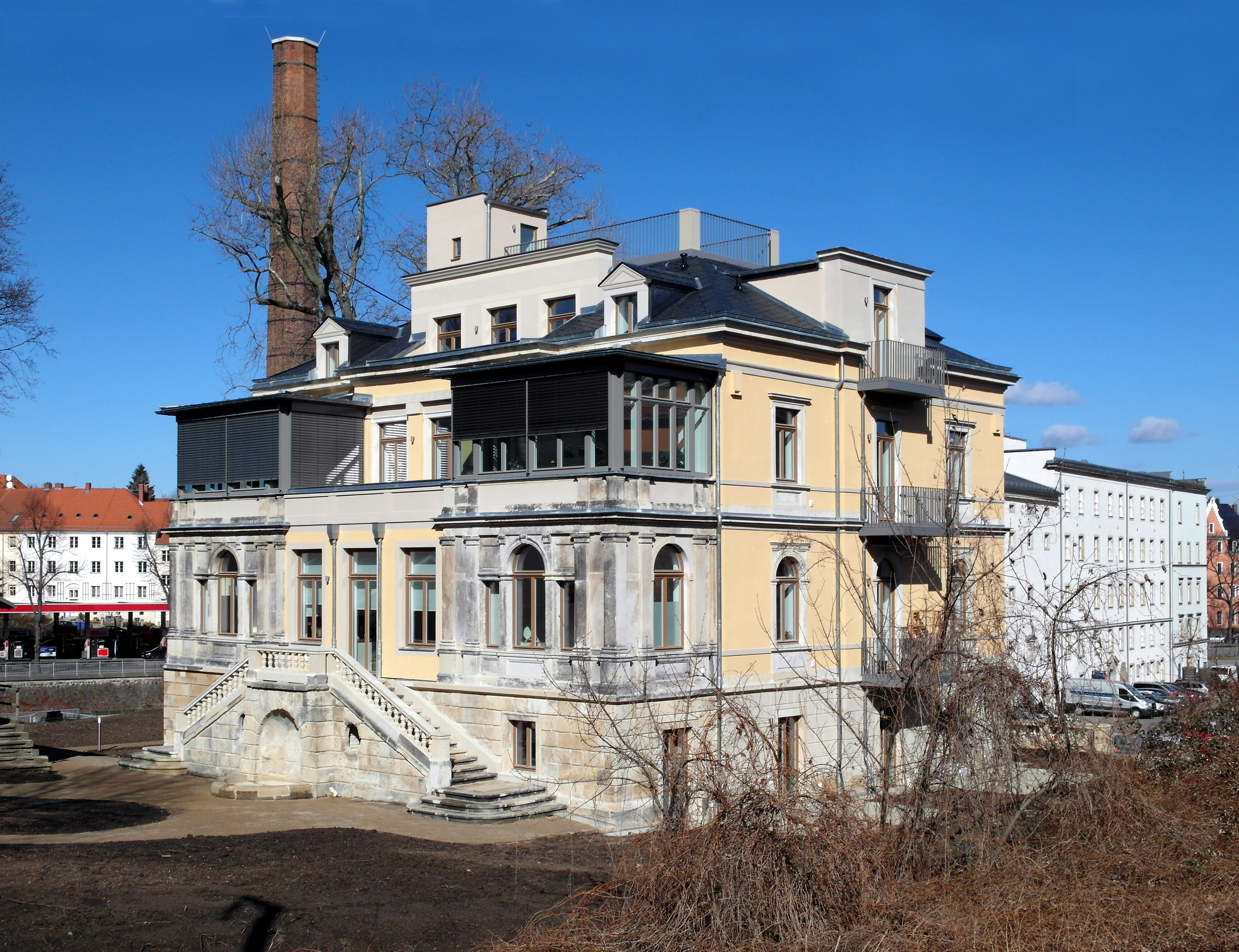
The renovated Bienert villa seen from the south-east (2018)

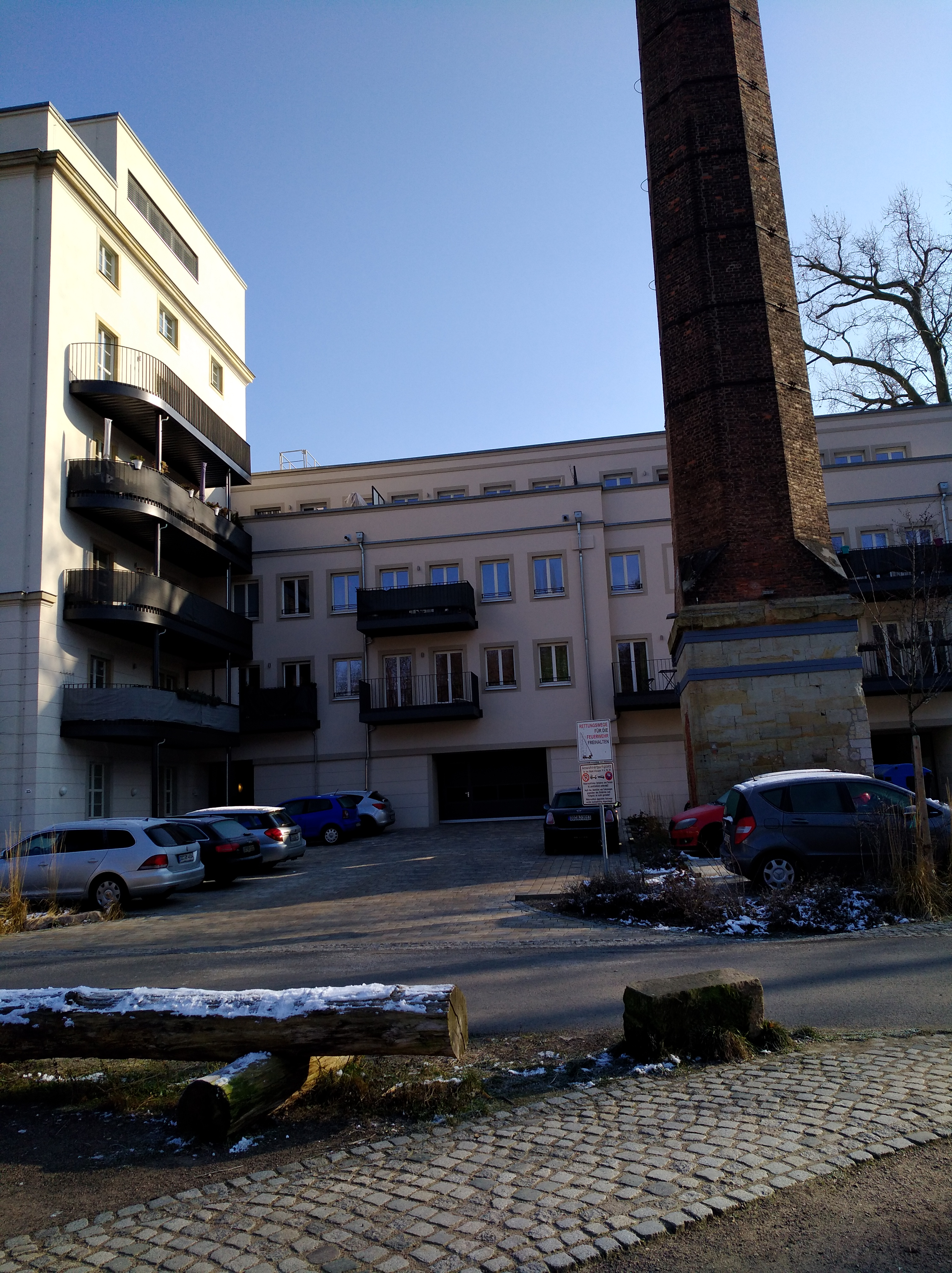
Refurbished and converted Bienertmühle with lofts from the west (2018)

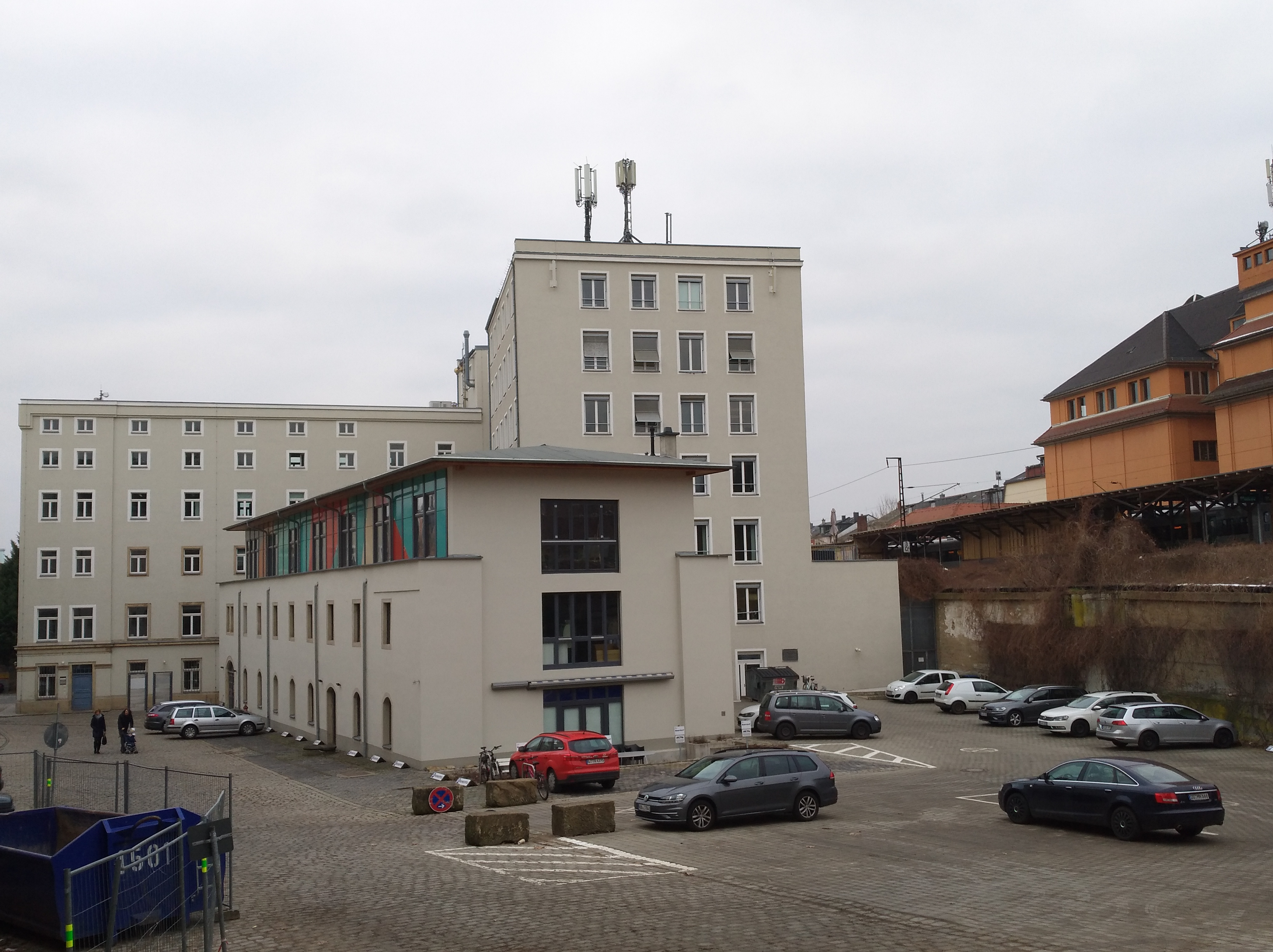
The old courtyard warehouse, gutted, top three floors removed and new staggered storey added (2018)

Between the end of 2010 and the spring of 2012, the former grain silo, built in 1938/1939 on the north side of Altplauenstraße, was demolished; after preliminary work, it could not be used as a training facility for a climbing school. Other ideas for the building's use also failed, in part because of the high renovation costs.

From 2006 to 2018, about 30 companies, including an organic food store, service providers, engineering firms, architects, creative businesses, as well as a model workshop, a dance school, and a yoga studio, were housed in the aforementioned main building from 1878, the old granary (the upper floors of which were partially demolished and replaced by a new structure), the former rye mill, and the former mill store.

The original plan was to convert only the parts of the mill with windows overlooking the Weißeritz into apartments, but this plan was changed due to demand: Since 2012, nearly 60 apartments have been built on the site in various locations: The first new residents moved into the old machine house. The adjacent New Grain Mill and the boiler house were then converted. In addition, two floors of the workshop building facing the courtyard (the former " sack cleaning ") will be converted into apartments, ready for occupancy in 2020. The Bienert Villa has also been extensively renovated since 2015 and was completed as a building at the end of 2017. Ten apartments were created in the listed building by a Dresden real estate company, but instead of the clock in the gable, there is now a round window. But while the historic Bienert Villa, despite its prestigious design, has architecturally been part of the industrial area since its construction, the new building since 2015 can be described as palatial.

The Mühlgraben was finally closed after the Weißeritz flood of 2002 and its mouth below the Altplauen bridge, which has since been rebuilt, was sealed, as was the inlet at the Bienertmühlen weir below the Hegereiter bridge. It has remained dry in the area of the Bienert garden.

The Bienert Garden, on the other hand, went to the Naturschutzbund Deutschland and is once again partially accessible to the public as part of a Bienert Trail. Various species of bat inhabit the so-called "Lusthöhle" (an artificial cave), including the western barbastelle, which is on the Red List of endangered species. Dippers and kingfishers have also established territories in this area.

In a newspaper article from February 17/18, 2018, the author Annechristin Bonß takes stock of the status of the renovation and the popularity of the site in her article The third life of the Bienertmühle begins:

"If you want to go to the Bienertmühle, you don't need to give an address in a cab."

== Bibliography ==
- Adolf Jädicke: Die Hofmühle zu Plauen-Dr. Zum 1. Mai 1897. Self-publishing, Plauen-Dresden 1897. (digital copy).
- T. Bienert Dampfmühle u. Oelfabrik, Hofmühle Dresden-Plauen. Gründung des Geschäfts: 1. Mai 1852. Dresden 1897 (digital copy). The handwritten annotations in the work are by Adolf Jädicke (died 1909), the Bienerts' private secretary.
- Paul Dittrich: Zwischen Hofmühle und Heidenschanze. Geschichte der Dresdner Vororte Plauen und Coschütz. 2nd, revised edition. Adolf Urban, Dresden 1941.
- Annette Dubbers: Plauen – Aus der Geschichte eines Dresdner Stadtteils. Publisher Annette Dubbers, Dresden 2006, ISBN 3-937199-34-9
- Jürgen Riess: Der Bienertweg im Plauenschen Grund – Ein Wander- und Naturführer durch eine einmalige Natur- und Industrielandschaft. Association for Scientists and Engineering Staff Dresden e. V. (WIMAD) (ed.) (= Dresdner Impressionen, vol. 2). 2nd, revised edition. Dresden 2013, without ISBN.
- Dresden Historical Society (ed.): Die Geschichte der Familie Bienert (= 00Dresdner Hefte – Contributions to cultural history,00 No. 116, 4/2013). Dresden 2013, ISBN 978-3-944019-05-5. From this in particular:
  - Dirk Schaal: Gottlieb Traugott Bienert – Ein Gründerzeitunternehmer in Dresden. p. 11–19.
  - Jürgen Riess: Vom alten Handwerk zur modernen Brotfabrik. p. 29–36.
  - Hans-Peter Lühr: Friedrich Bienert und der Geist von Weimar – Eine biographische Studie. p. 55–64.
  - Jürgen Riess: Was aus dem Brotimperium wurde – Die Firmengeschichte nach 1900. p. 65–75.
  - Carsten Hoffmann: Die Stiftung Hofmühle Dresden. p. 76–81.
- Annechristin Bonß: Neue Heimat in Bienerts Mühle. In: 00Sächsische Zeitung,00 Issue August 20/21, 2016, p. 18. Also online (last accessed on October 9, 2020).
- Annechristin Bonß: Das dritte Leben der Bienertmühle beginnt. In: Sächsische Zeitung, Issue February 17/18, 2018, p. 18. Also online (last accessed on October 9, 2020).

51°01′48″N 13°42′08″E
