= Museum für angewandte Kunst =

Museum für angewandte Kunst (German: Museum of applied arts) may refer to:

- Museum für angewandte Kunst Frankfurt in Frankfurt
- Museum für Angewandte Kunst (Cologne) in Cologne
- Museum für Angewandte Kunst (Leipzig) in Leipzig
- Museum für angewandte Kunst Wien in Vienna

== See also ==
- Museum of Applied Arts (disambiguation)
