= Grassi Museum =

Museum in Leipzig, Germany

Coordinates: 51°20′15″N 12°23′18″E

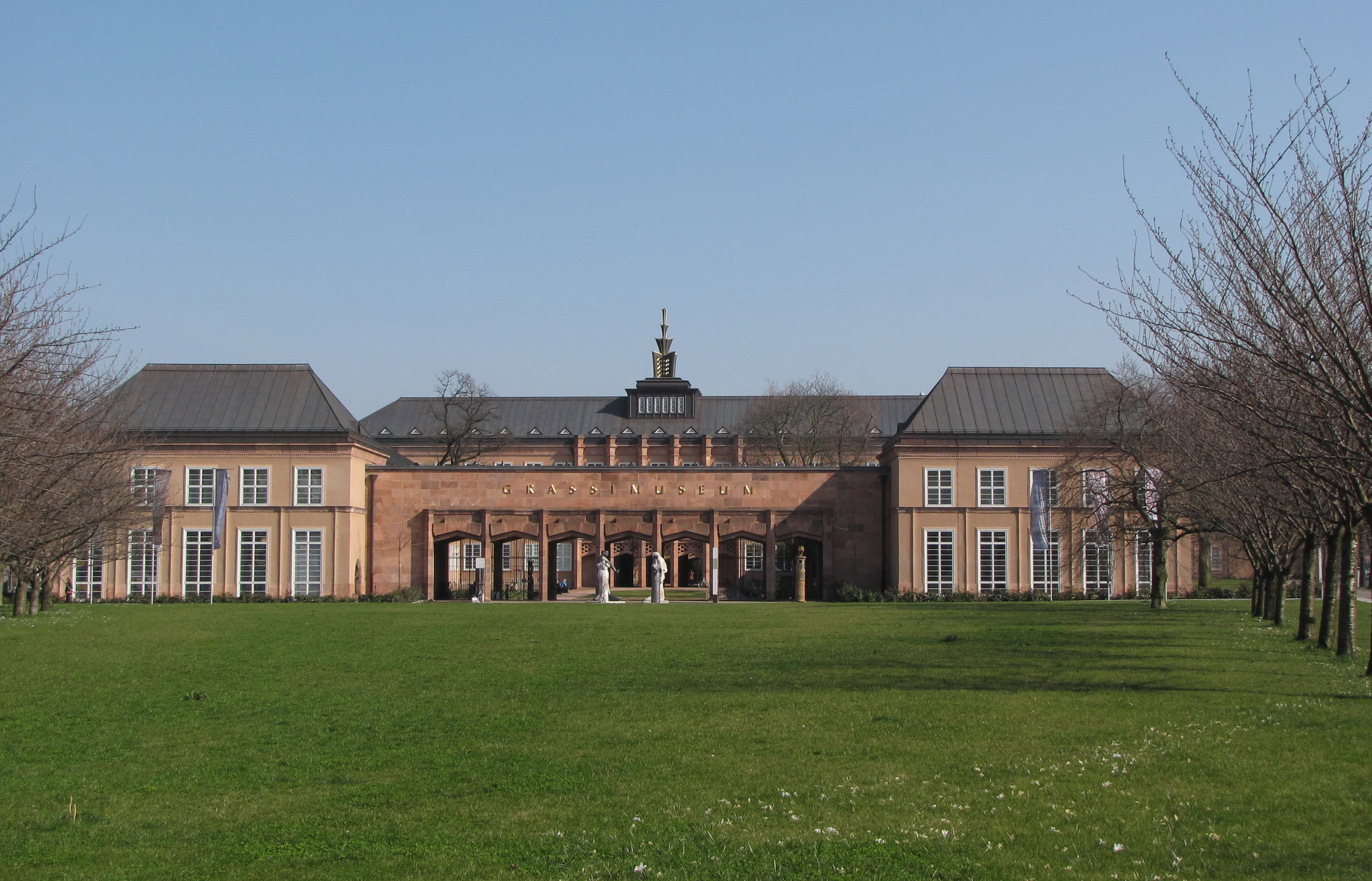
Entrance to the Grassi Museum

Grassi Museum, Leipzig, Saxony

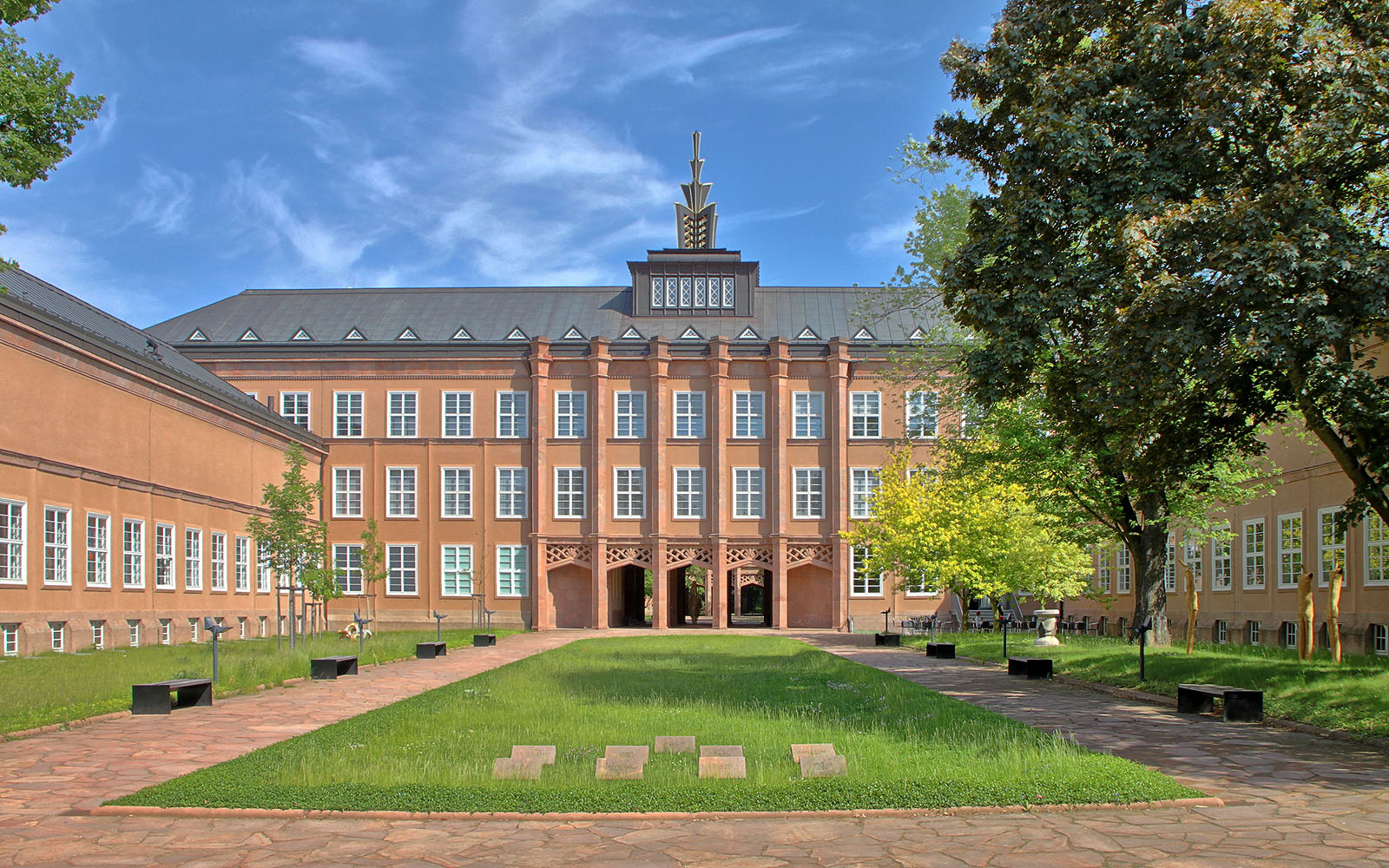
Courtyard

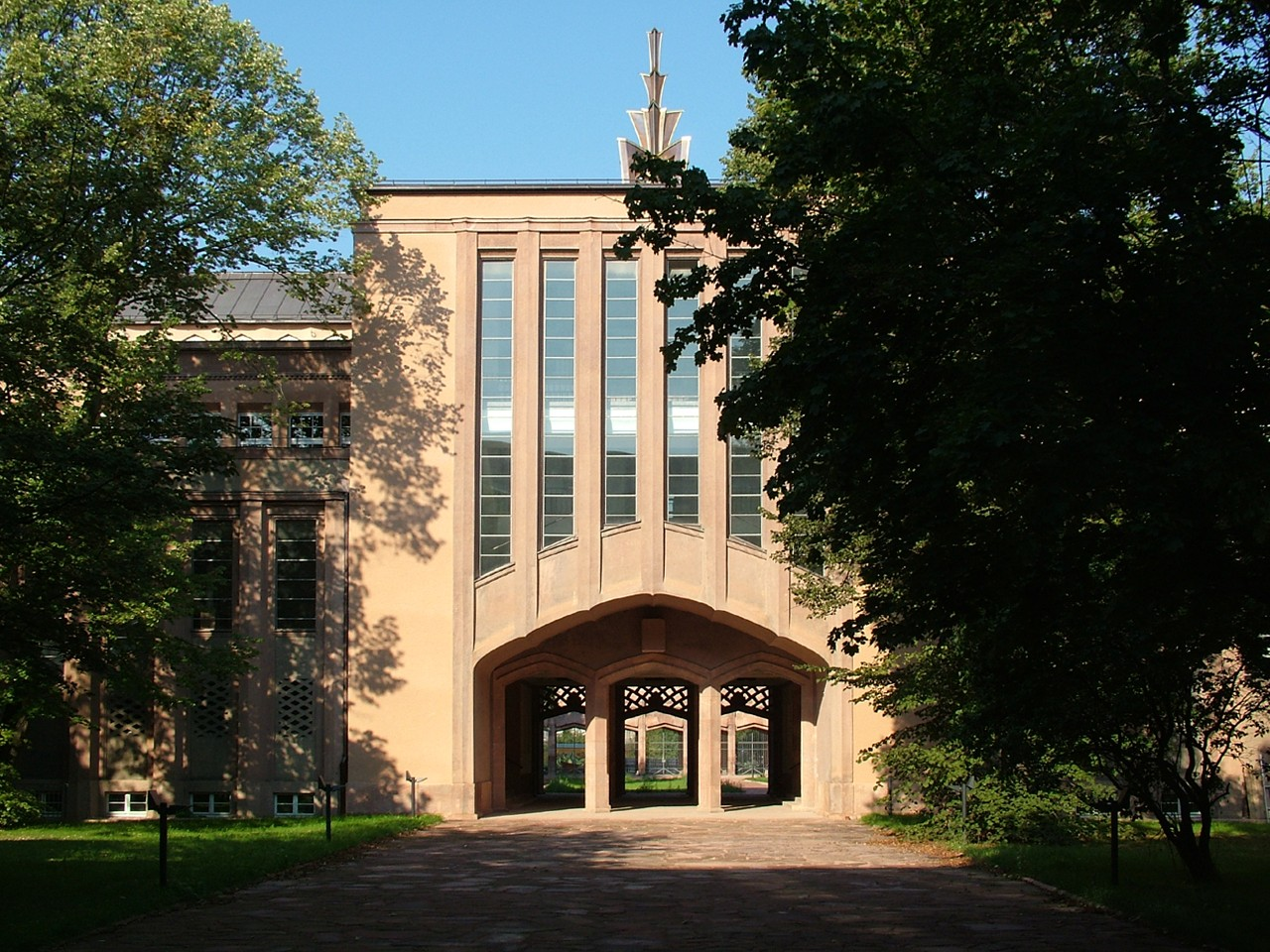
Second courtyard

The Grassi Museum is a building complex in Leipzig, home to three museums: the Ethnography Museum, Musical Instruments Museum, and Applied Arts Museum.

It is sometimes known as the "Museums in the Grassi", or as the "New" Grassi Museum (to distinguish it from the older building with this name, now home to the municipal library).

== Origins ==
The museum is named after Franz Dominic Grassi, a Leipzig businessman of Italian descent, who bequeathed over two million marks to the city upon his death in 1880. This helped pay for a number of new constructions, including the Gewandhaus and the Mende Fountain, as well as the "Old Grassi Museum". Built from 1892 to 1895 on the Königsplatz (now Wilhelm-Leuschner-Platz), this originally housed the Museum of Ethnography and the Museum of Arts and Crafts, and is now the municipal library.

== New building ==
The old museum became too small for the collections, prompting its director to call for an architecture competition to design a new building, to be paid for with the Grassi bequest. The winning firm designed a building with elements of New Objectivity and Art Deco, based around several courtyards. It was built from 1925 to 1929 (one of the few new museums of the Weimar Era), on the site of the old Johannis Hospital. The urban planner Hubert Ritter had intended for it to be the starting point of an eastward expansion of the city. It contained originally the Saint John's Church, demolished in 1963.

The New Grassi Museum was severely bombed in 1943, with the loss of tens of thousands of items. Rebuilding began in 1947, with the first exhibitions in 1954. It was closed from 1981 to 1985 due to a problem with the heating system. It was completely renovated from 2001 to 2005, including the removal of some of the front windows. It reopened partly in 2005, though the Museum of Applied Arts did not reopen until 2007.

It is a historically preserved building, and is one of around 20 so-called "Cultural Lighthouses" in the German government's Blue Book of culturally significant sites in the former East Germany. As such, it is a member of the Konferenz Nationaler Kultureinrichtungen.

== Repatriation ==
In 2023 the museum was one of seven German museums to return Māori and Moriori remains to the Museum of New Zealand Te Papa Tongarewa in New Zealand.

== Trade fair ==
The Grassi Museum hosts an annual trade fair in October, the Grassimesse, whose origins go back to 1920.
