= Museum of Musical Instruments of Leipzig University =

Museum in Germany

Museum of Musical Instruments of the University of Leipzig

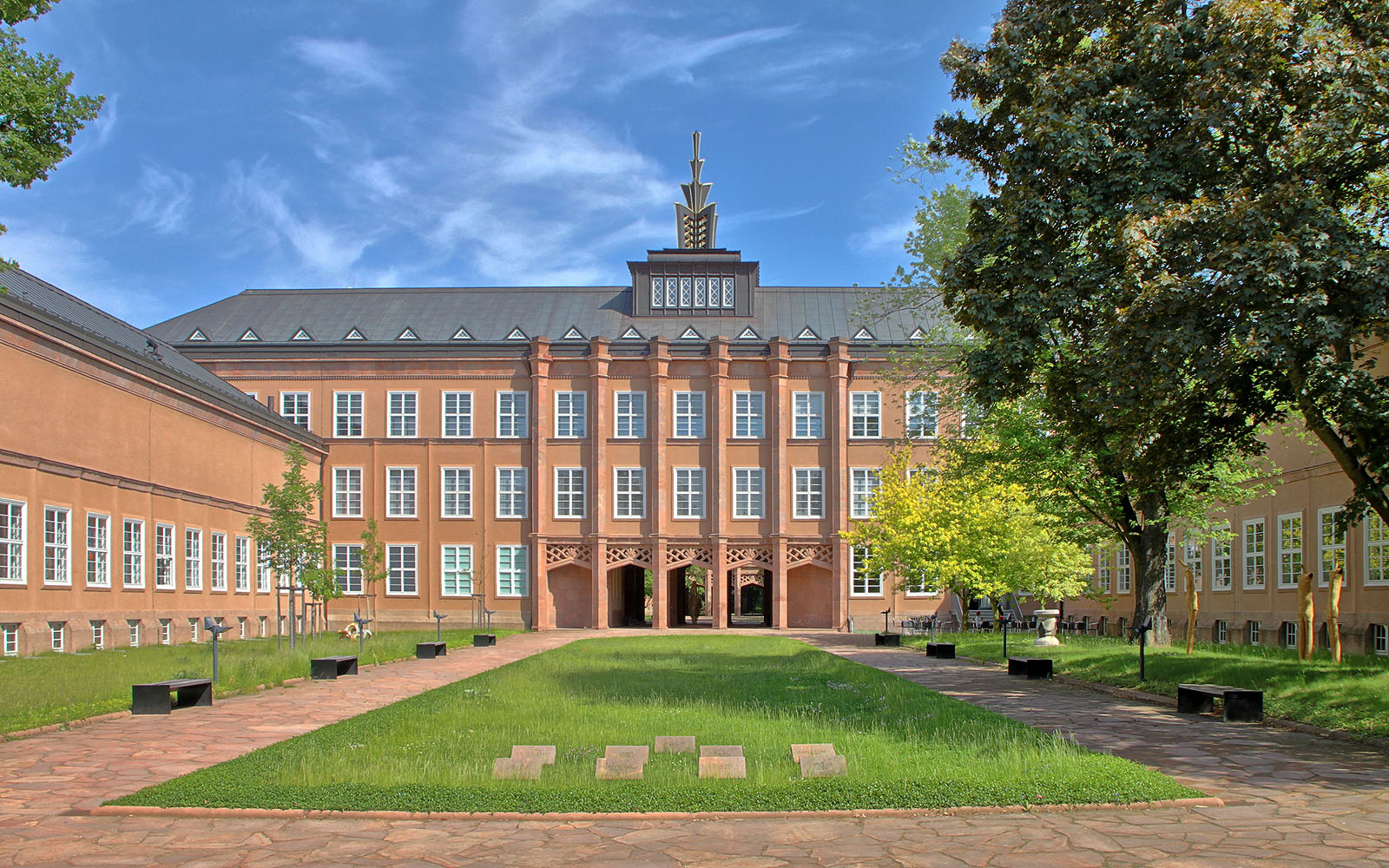
- Established: 1929
- Location: Leipzig, Germany
- Website: Official website

The Museum of Musical Instruments of the University of Leipzig (German: Musikinstrumentenmuseum der Universität Leipzig) is a museum in Leipzig, Germany. It is located on Johannisplatz, near the city centre. The museum belongs to the University of Leipzig and is also part of the Grassi Museum, whose other members are the Museum of Ethnography and the Museum of Applied Arts.

It is one of the largest music instrument museums in Europe, alongside those of Brussels and of Paris. Its collection of around 10,000 objects includes valuable instruments from Europe and beyond, as well as music-related items from the Renaissance, the Baroque, and Bach's Leipzig period.

== History ==
In 1886 the Dutchman Paul de Wit opened a museum of historic musical instruments in Leipzig, but he sold the collection to the paper merchant Wilhelm Heyer in 1905. The "Wilhelm Heyer Museum of Music History" opened in 1913, containing De Wit's collection alongside that of the Florentine Baron Alessandro Kraus and keyboard instruments from the Prussian manufacturer Ibach. The collection was bought by the University of Leipzig in 1926, paid for partly by the State of Saxony and partly by the publisher C.F. Peters, and was opened in the New Grassi Museum in 1929.

Parts of the collection were removed for safekeeping during World War II, but a large number of the remaining items were destroyed during a bomb raid on the building in 1943, including the Ibach pianos, the archive and the library. After the war it transpired that the items which had been removed were also significantly damaged or lost, owing to improper storage or theft.

Starting in the 1950s, the museum was gradually rebuilt and reopened to the public. The collection was expanded anew over the following decades, through purchases and donations. All or part of the De Wit, Heyer, Kraus and Ibach collections still survive.

The museum is a member of the Konferenz Nationaler Kultureinrichtungen, a union of more than twenty cultural institutions in the former East Germany.

== Exhibition ==
The permanent exhibition presents the major eras of musical history (in particular that of Leipzig) and instrument technology. The oldest exhibits date from the 16th century. The exhibition is chronologically ordered and divided into 13 sections. Besides those mentioned above, the most important collections include bowed, wind and percussion instruments, piano rolls, the collection of Friedrich von Amerling, and a 1931 theatre organ. The museum also contains a sound laboratory where musical instruments can be tested out.

== University connections ==
The museum has been part of the University of Leipzig since 1929, and includes a teaching collection and a study collection. It also holds teaching events for students of Leipzig University and the University of Music and Theatre Leipzig.

== See also ==
- List of music museums
