= Museum of Applied Arts =

Museum of Applied Arts may refer to:

- Leipzig Museum of Applied Arts, Germany
- Museum of Applied Arts (Belgrade), Serbia
- Museum of Applied Arts (Budapest), Hungary
- Museum of Applied Arts (Helsinki), Finland
- Museum für angewandte Kunst Frankfurt, Germany
- Museum für Angewandte Kunst (Cologne), Germany
- Museum für angewandte Kunst Wien, Austria
- Stieglitz Museum of Applied Arts (Saint Petersburg), Russia
