= Hubert Ritter =

German architect (1886–1967)

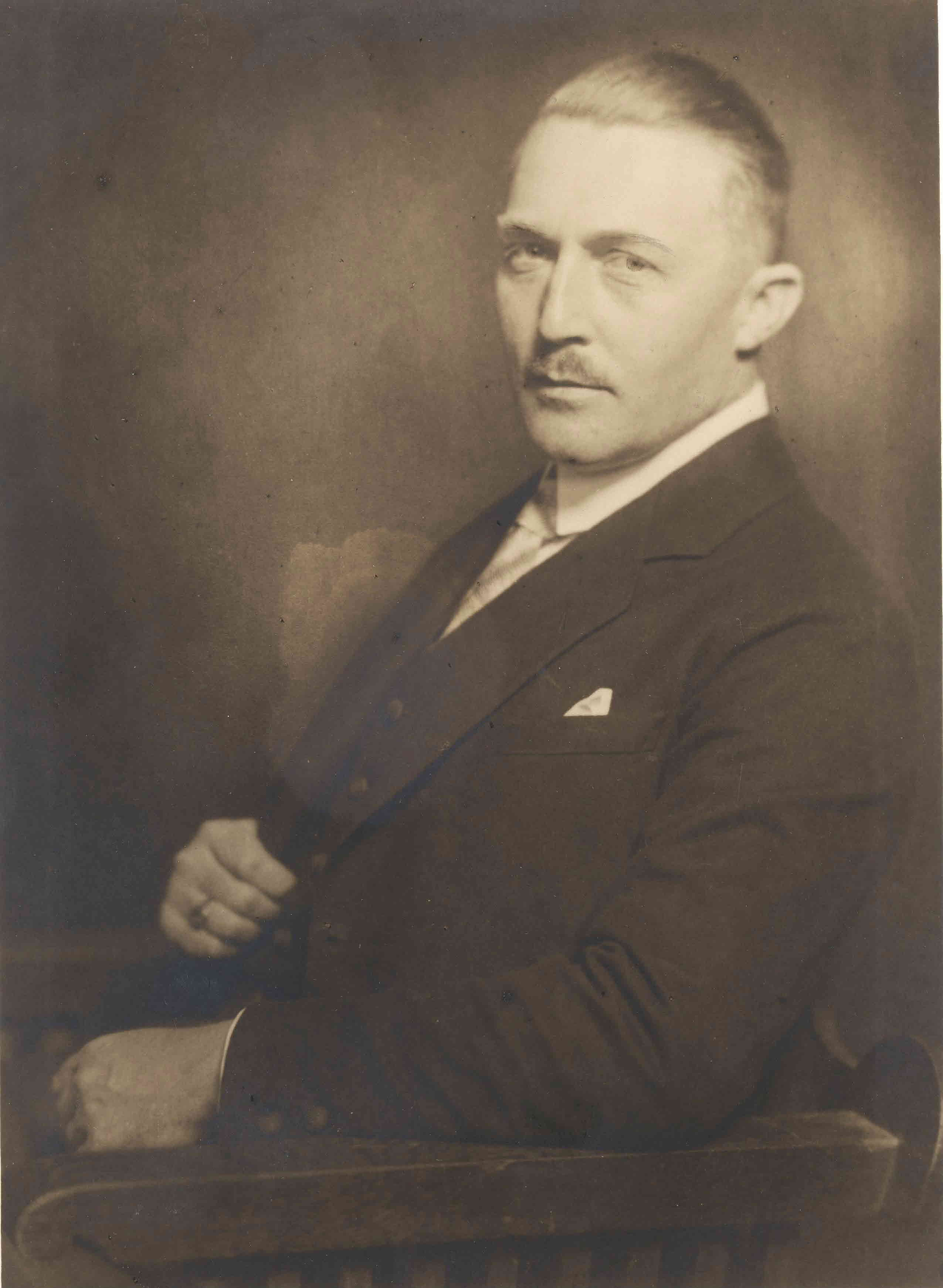
- Hubert Ritter (around 1925)
- Born: 17 March 1886; Nuremberg, Germany
- Died: 25 May 1967 (aged 81); Munich, Germany
- Occupation: Architect

Hubert Hans Ritter (17 March 1886 – 25 May 1967) was a German architect, urban planner and building official.

== Life ==
Hubert Ritter came from a Nuremberg family of artists on his father's side, his grandfather was the painter and engraver Lorenz Ritter, his father the painter Paul Ritter the Younger. Ritter's maternal grandfather was the psychiatrist Bernhard von Gudden, who drowned in Lake Starnberg with Ludwig II of Bavaria.

After the death of the father in 1888, the mother moved to Munich with her two children. There Hubert Ritter attended the humanistic Wilhelmsgymnasium after Grundschule an der Herrnstraße, where he graduated from high school in 1905 with "very good".

Ritter studied architecture at the Technical University of Munich. On the recommendation of his teacher Friedrich von Thiersch, he joined the academic architects' association in Munich as a student. He passed his main diploma examination in 1909 "with distinction". In the same year he became engaged to Margarethe Krauß, the daughter of the director of a mortgage bank, whom he married in the summer of 1911 in the Munich St. Boniface's Abbey. In the summer of 1909, Ritter began working in Thiersch's Frankfurt office, where he worked on the planning of the Festhalle Frankfurt and the expansion of the Kurhaus in Wiesbaden.

To prepare for the state examination, he had to switch to the local building commission and the supreme building authority in Munich as a trainee. He also designed the building for a puppet theater in Munich. After the approval of the Supreme Building Authority, he was allowed to open a private office alongside his official work. There he carried out his first major commission in Munich at the end of 1910, a development plan (Bebauungsplan). In April 1911, Ritter made his first trip to Italy. In the summer of 1912 his eldest son Hubert jr. born. Also in 1912 he passed the second Staatsexamen onto government architect (Regierungsbaumeister) with grade 1. He then worked in the district building department of the government of Upper Bavaria.

From 1913 to 1924 he worked as a master builder in the municipal building administration of the city of Cologne. One of his first jobs there was planning the conversion of the Gürzenich, and that's when he got in touch with Konrad Adenauer, who was in charge of the city's finance at the time, who was enthusiastic about Ritter’s financial structuring of the building complex and persuaded his uncle, Cologne's Mayor Max Wallraf, to entrust Ritter with the renovation of the Cologne City Hall, which lasted until mid-1916. On 27 March 1914 Ritter's daughter Lieselotte was born. In 1917, Ritter took over the management of the building department of the war office in Koblenz. On 24 August 1918, the daughter Martha was born, and on 10 February 1922, the eight-month-old daughter Emma died of pneumonia.

In January 1923, Ritter was appointed building supervisor (Baurat) for lifetime. The youngest son, Hans Georg, was born on 27 July 1924. During this time, Ritter wanted to write a dissertation on the topic "The Cologne traffic problems". The rector of the university and the head of the transport department had already given their approval when the then mayor Adenauer, at the instigation of the head of the city expansion office, prohibited this project. As a result, Ritter applied for the vacancies of the city planning officer in Nuremberg and in Leipzig. Since Leipzig reacted first, he introduced himself there and finally took up his duties in Leipzig on 21 November 1924. One of his first tasks was the creation of a general development plan. For this purpose, he had an aerial plan made up of 52 panels on a scale of 1:5000, which covered a total area of 409 km^{2} (158 sq mi) with a maximum error limit of 1 mm (0.039 in) per panel. In 1925, Ritter's family also moved from Cologne to Leipzig.

After staying briefly in Südstraße (today Karl-Liebknecht-Straße), they moved into the ground floor of a house newly built by the architect Riedel at Rückertstraße 18. In Leipzig, Ritter initiated the “Siedlungswoche” (Settlement week) that took place in March 1927. There, representatives from the cities of Amsterdam, Berlin, Hamburg, Karlsruhe, Cologne, Leipzig, London, Vienna, Zürich and cities of the USA discussed modern housing and settlement construction. At this time, Ritter became a member of the Reichsforschungsgesellschaft für Wirtschaftlichkeit im Bau- und Wohnungswesen (Reich Research Society for Economic Efficiency in Building and Housing). There he was a member of the committee for steel construction methods as well as Walter Gropius.

Shortly before the end of Ritter's electoral term in November 1930, the SPD, KPD and NSDAP demanded that the position of the city planning officer be advertised, and a hate campaign against him unexpectedly broke out. The NSDAP agitated against him using a poster, the SPD opposed Ritter's re-election in newspaper articles. In the city council meeting in December 1930, in which there are said to have been tumultuous scenes, he was not re-elected by a vote of 34 to 24. Moritz Wolf from Hindenburg (today: Zabrze) in Upper Silesia was elected city planning officer for the next six years.

The Leipzig university clinic district was also part of Ritter’s general development plan of 1924, so that he had to get in touch with the heads of these clinics at the time and from 1927 he also took part in the congresses of the International Hospital Society. So in 1931 he got into hospital construction as a freelance architect. His first free assignment was the completion of the new building for the St. Elisabeth Hospital in Leipzig. Ritter was finally awarded 1932 by the Technical University of Hanover with his work The hospital construction of the present at home and abroad. Economics, organization and technology with distinction for Dr.-Ing. PhD. He was then on the committee of the Deutscher Städtetag working as an appraiser.

After 1936, following a decree by the Saxon Gauleiter Martin Mutschmann, Ritter no longer received any public contracts. In 1940, Ritter who was commissioned to draw up the general development plan for the city of Kraków, probably through the mediation of a friend from university.

In the fall of 1941 he was offered the post of the city planning officer in Luxembourg City, with the task of drawing up the general development plan.

On 4 June 1945, Ritter obtained one of the first US permits in Bad Ems in order to work as a former Leipzig city planning officer in the reconstruction of the hospitals, but the Leipzig city administration was not interested in this. When Leipzig then went over to the Soviet occupation zone of Germany, the occupying power obliged him to build Russian military hospitals. After Ritter's urban planning proposals did not meet with interest in Leipzig and his preliminary planning for a hotel at the main train station with the words "The form you proposed in your sketch will not be used under any circumstances, because we want to see realized the cultural heritage and not formalistic forms in our buildings." had been rejected, he decided to return to his children in Munich on 26 October 1952. There he worked in the office of his son Hans Ritter, primarily with the reconstruction of hospitals, such as the Rechts der Isar Hospital, the University Clinic in Cologne or, in 1956, the extension of the St. Elisabeth Hospital in Straubing. His last work was the preliminary project for the St. Elisabeth Hospital in Bad Kissingen.

Hubert Ritter died of heart failure in 1967 shortly after he was 81 years old.

== Works ==
=== Buildings and designs ===
in Munich:

- 1910: Kasperltheater Birkenmeyer
- 1910–1911: Residential buildings in Widenmayerstrasse
- 1911–1912: Residential complex on Winzerstrasse
- 1912: Residential building at the corner of Nymphenburger Strasse and Landshuter Allee

in Cologne:

- 1913–1916: Conversion of Cologne City Hall
- 1920: City Council Hall in the Spanish building of Cologne City Hall
- 1922–1923: Volksschule at the Sülzgürtel (later: „Theodor-Heuss-Realschule“)
- 1922–1923: Women's old people's home, Jakobstrasse
- 1923: Factory of automobiles Scheele

in Leipzig:

- 1925–1929: New Grassi Museum, Johannisplatz 5–11 (preliminary urban design and overall management; architects: Carl William Zweck, Hans Voigt
- 1925: Gross meat market hall at the municipal cattle and slaughterhouse (with Carl James Bühring; demolished)
- 1925–1926: Planetarium (destroyed)
- 1925–1926: Conversion including shortening by 7 m (23 ft) of the 65 m (213 ft) tall water tower built in 1907/1908, Tauchaer Strasse 14 (together with Carl James Bühring)
- 1926: Housing development with 216 type apartments, Mockauer Straße 32-76, Friedrichshafner Strasse 69, 70, Gontardweg 137 (because of their porphyry-colored plaster popularly called "Red Front")
- 1926–1927: Boiler house of the children's clinic, Eilenburger Strasse
- 1927: Pillar hall in the Grassi Museum
- 1927: Dermatological Clinic of the St. Jakob Municipal Hospital, Liebigstrasse 19–21
- 1927: Planning of the "Leipzig school type"
- 1928–1929: 31. Volksschule (today: Vocational School Center 1), Crednerstrasse 1 and 55. Volksschule, Ratzelstraße 26
- 1928–1929: IV. Höhere Mädchenschule „Max-Klinger-Schule“, Karl-Heine-Strasse 22, (today: Schule am Palmengarten)
- 1927–1930: Grossmarkthalle, An den Tierkliniken 40 (engineer: Franz Dischinger)
- 1928–1930: Westbad in Leipzig-Lindenau, Odermannstrasse 15
- 1929: Conversion of the Main Fire Station, Goerdelerring 7
- 1929–1930: Plague house (quarantine station) for the St. Jacob Hospital, Philipp-Rosenthal-Strasse (demolished after 2006)
- 1929–1930: Siedlung „Rundling“ in Leipzig-Lößnig, Siegfriedplatz 1–16, Nibelungenring 1–93
- 1930: Residential complex Rosenowstraße 31–57 in Mockau (street side with odd house numbers) built in the style of Neues Bauen
- 1930–1931: Hospital St. Elisabeth in Leipzig-Connewitz, Biedermannstrasse 84 (construction supervision based on plans by the architect Carl Fischer)
Buildings by Hubert Ritter

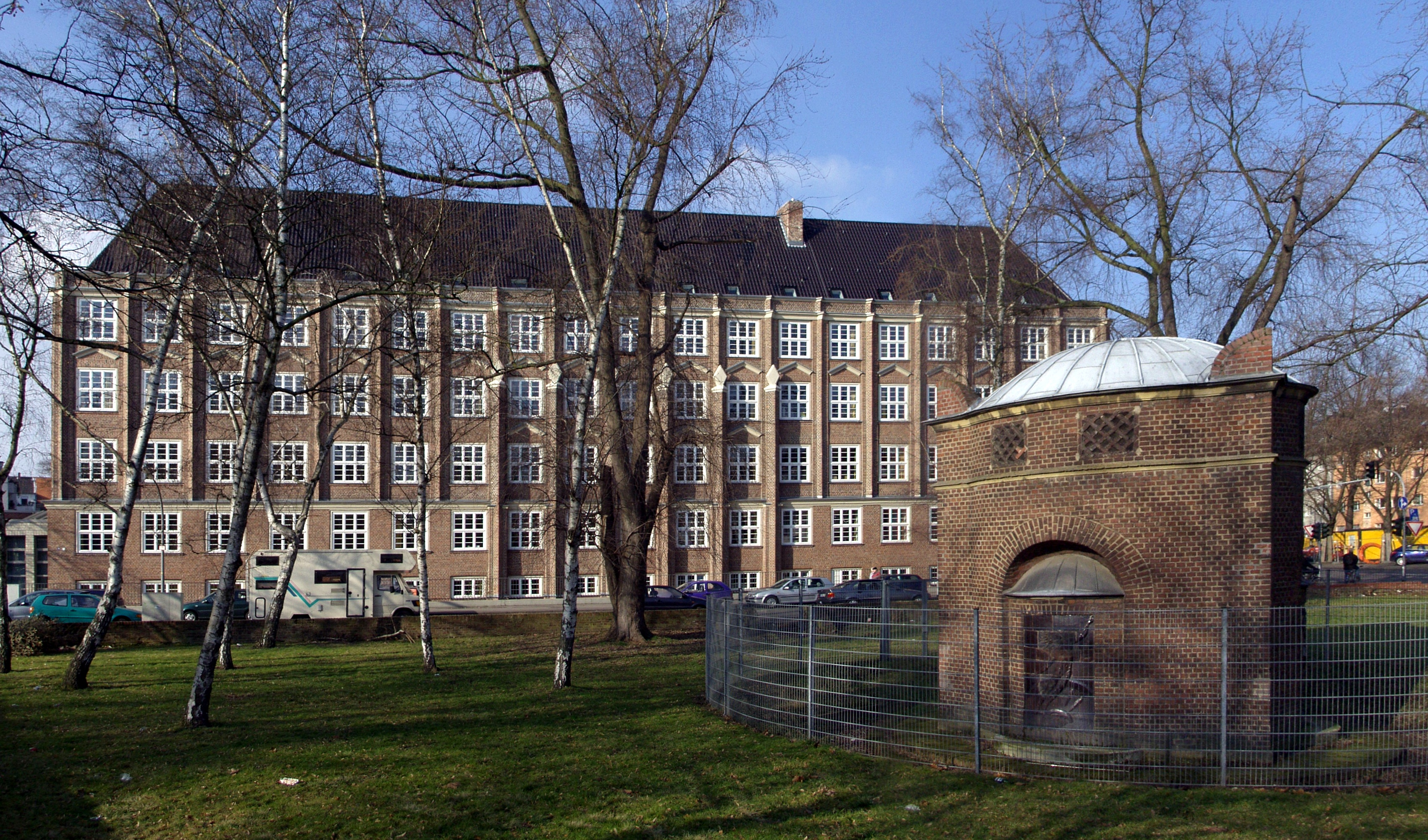
Cologne: Theodor-Heuss-Realschule

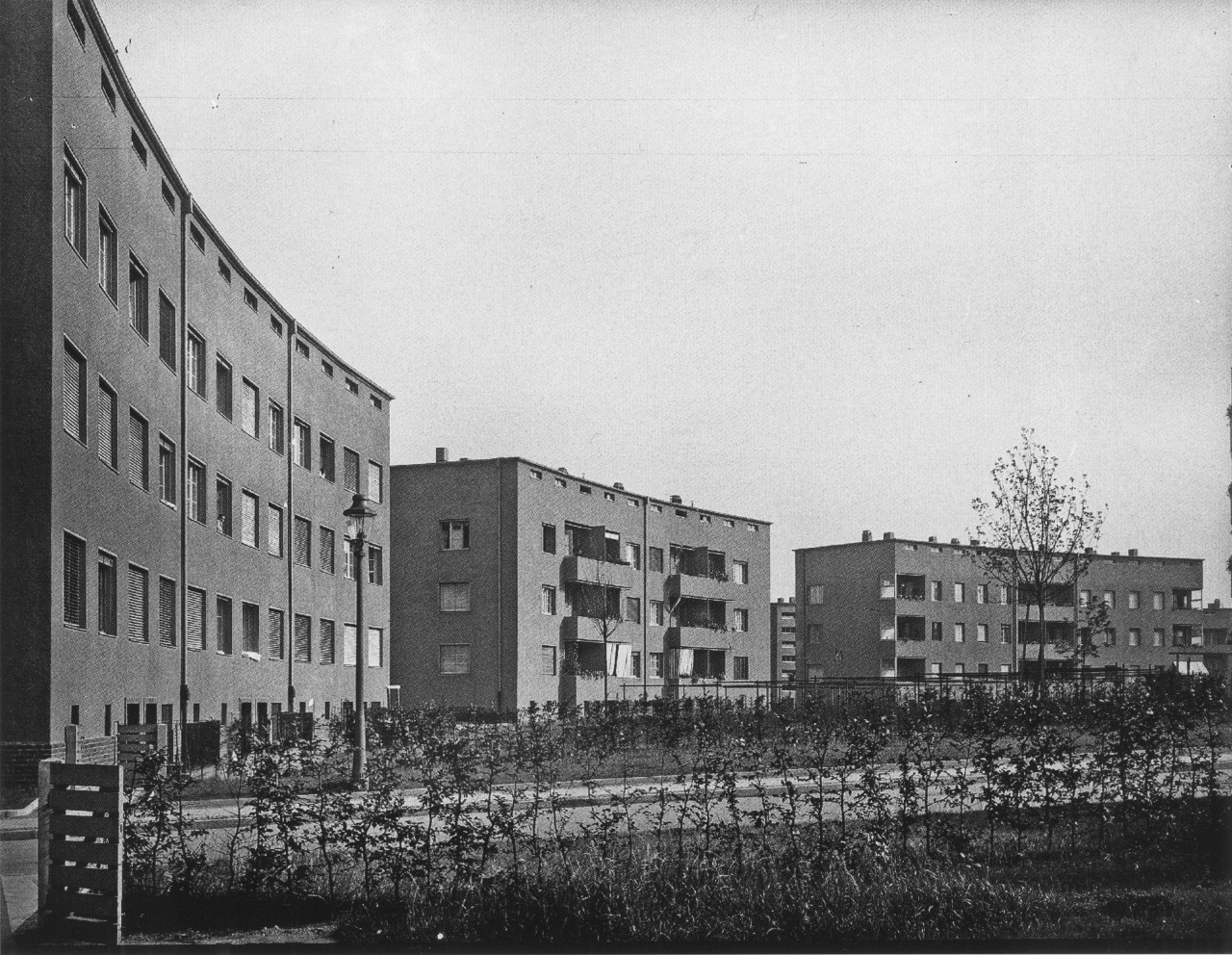
Leipzig: Rundling (1930)

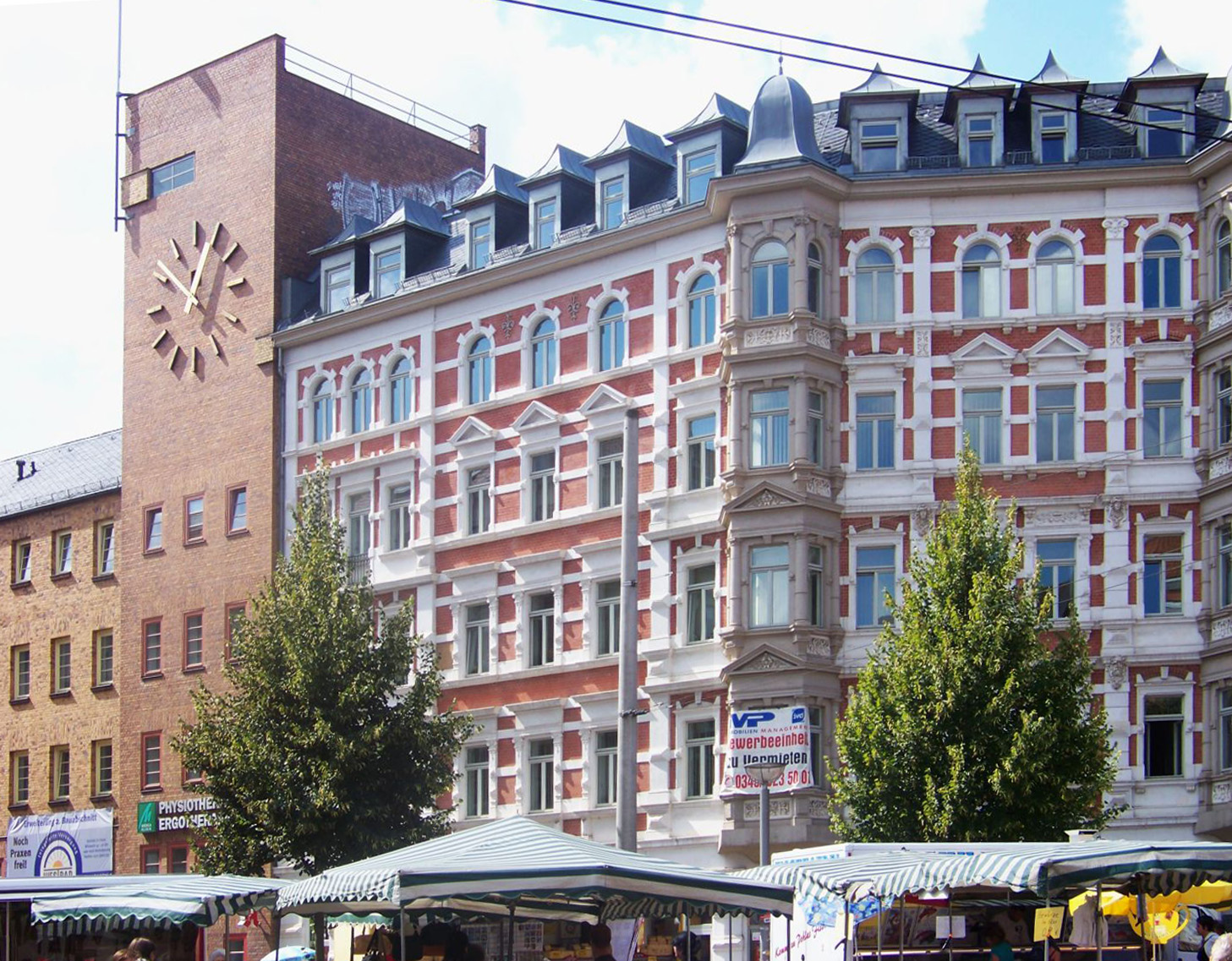
Leipzig: Westbad

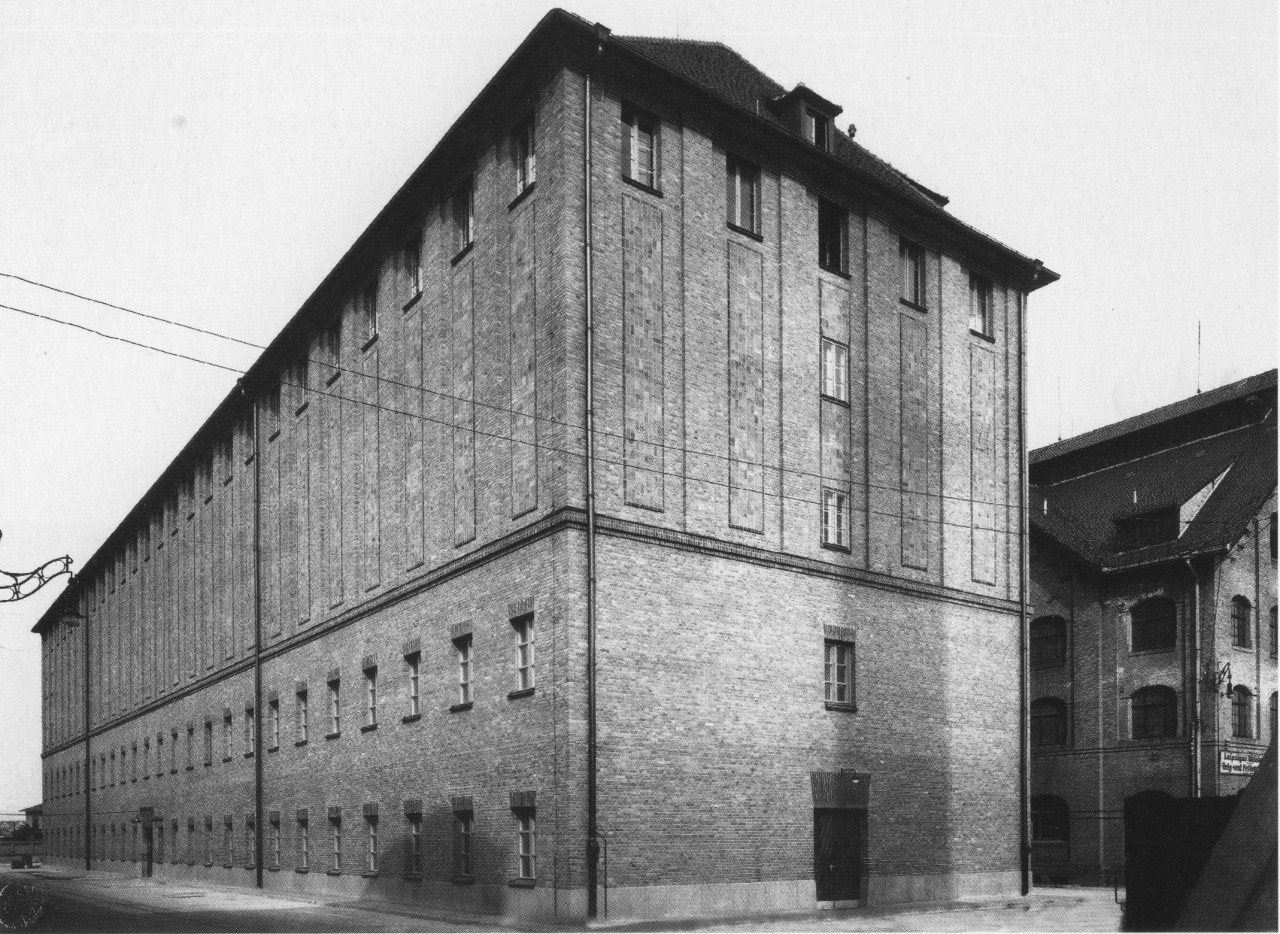
Leipzig: Hall of the Meat Market (1926)

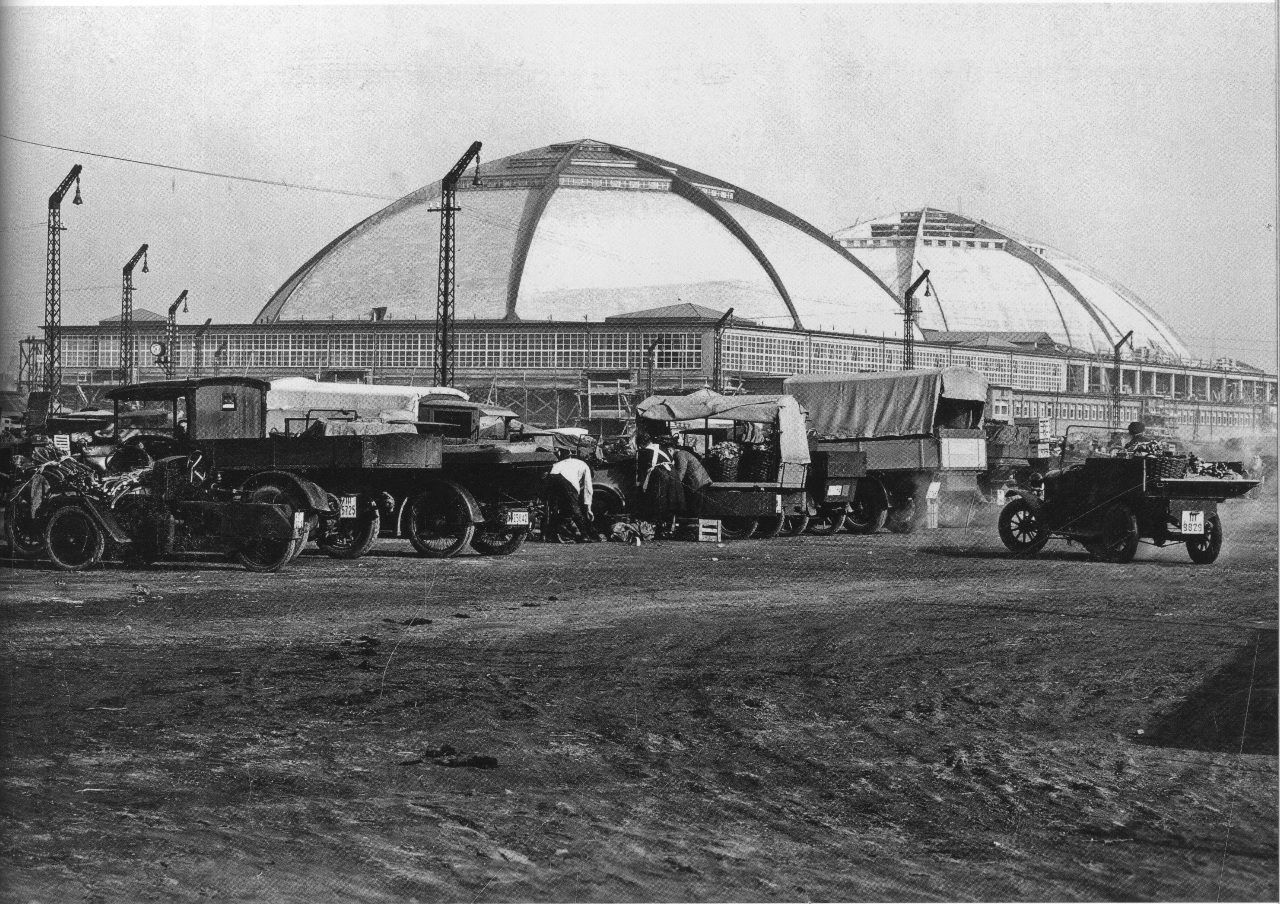
Leipzig: Grossmarkthalle (1929)

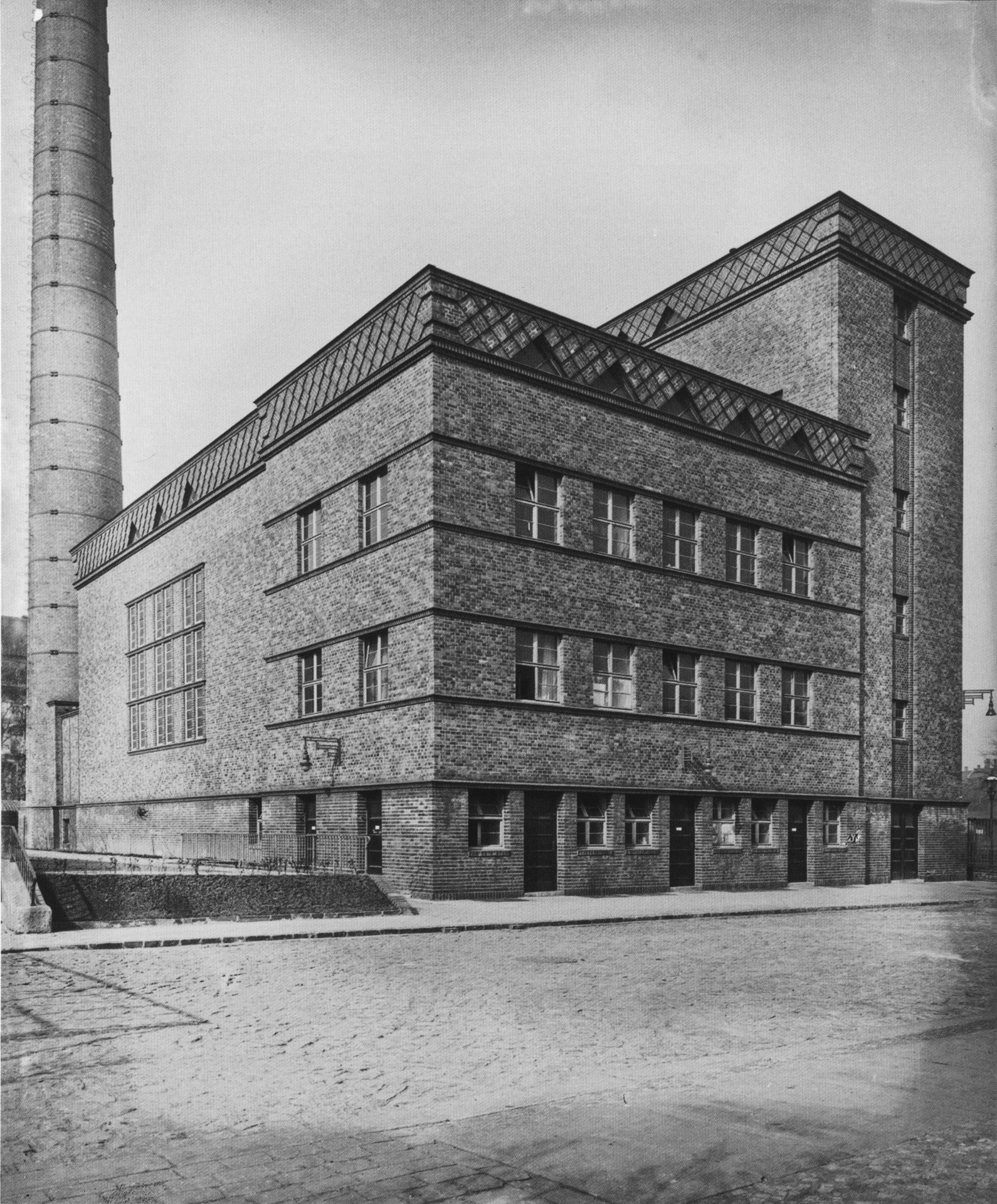
Leipzig: Boiler House of the Children's Clinic (1927)

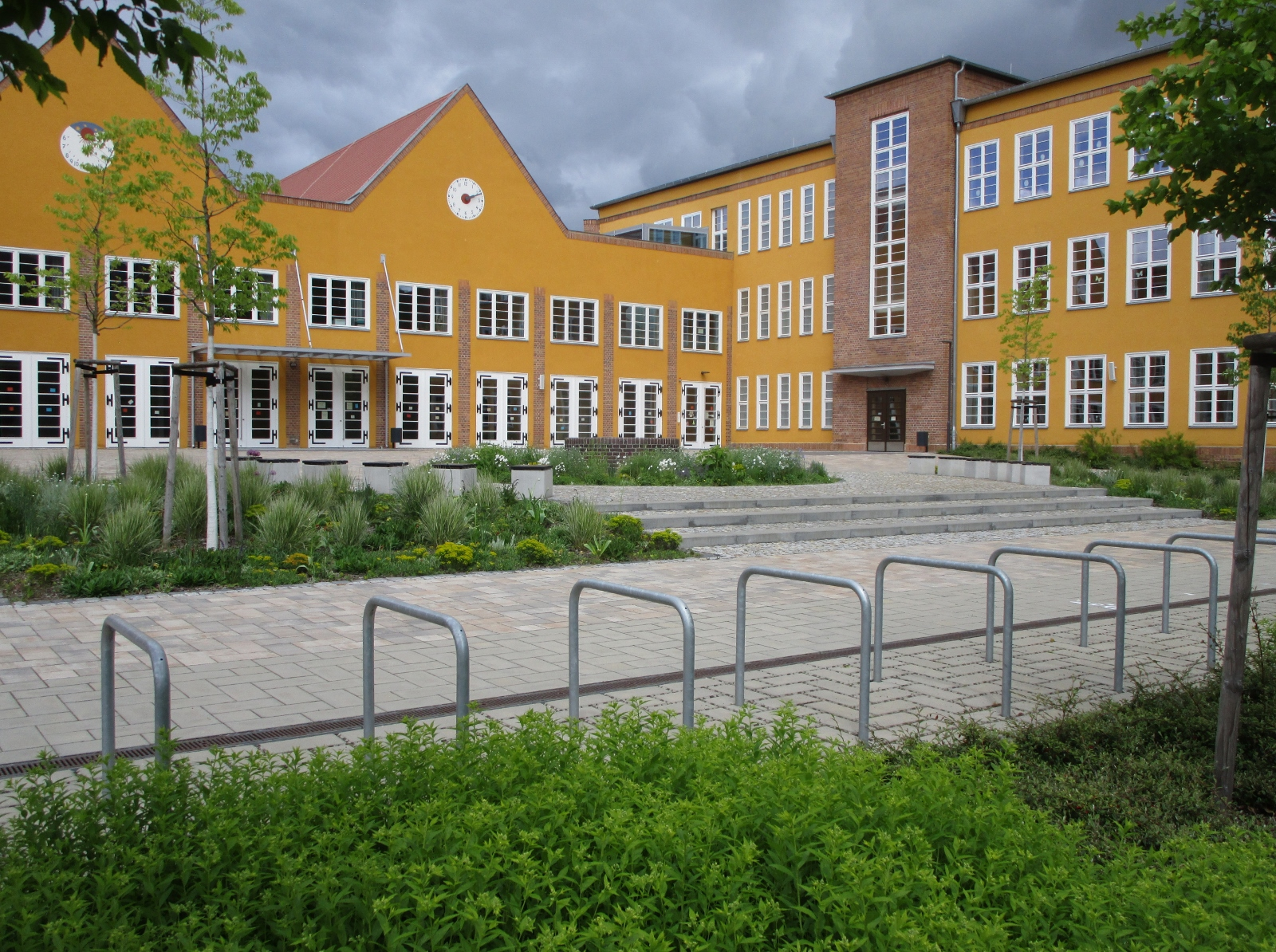
Leipzig, 55th school, Ratzelstrasse

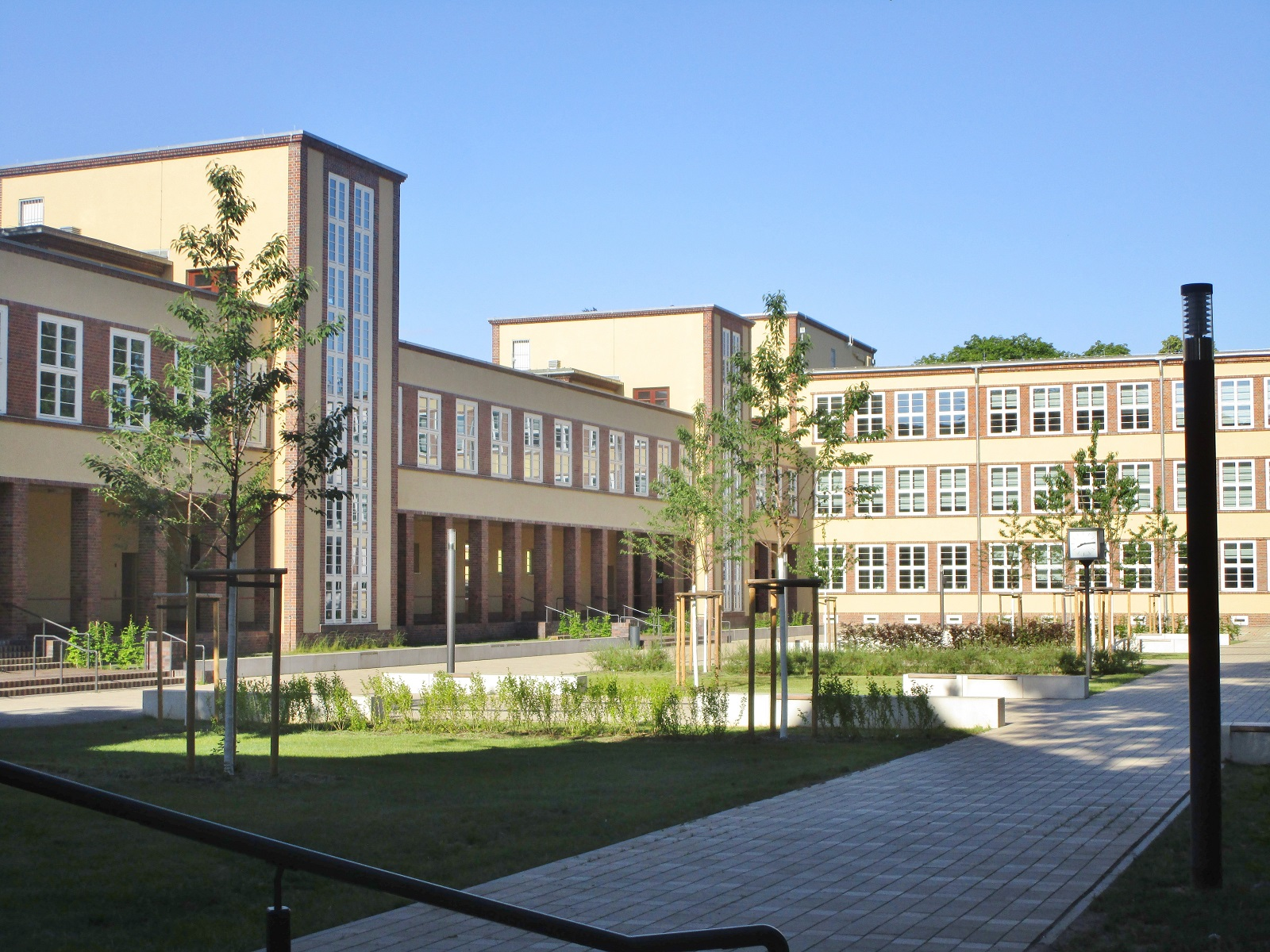
Leipzig: Schule am Palmengarten

== Miscellaneous ==
Ritter's work was part of the architecture event in the art competition at the 1928 Summer Olympics.

== Writings ==
- Kölner Bauprobleme. Gürzenich, Heumarkt, Neubau d. Kölner Rathauses, Dom-Umbauung. Hoursch & Bechstedt, Köln 1924.
- Neue Stadtbaukunst. Leipzig. Friedrich Ernst Hübsch Verlag, Berlin, Leipzig, Wien, 1927.
- Wohnung, Wirtschaft, Gestaltung. Ein Querschnitt durch die Leipziger Siedlungswoche März 1927 und dem anschließenden Lehrgang über das deutsche Siedlungswesen in Stadt und Land. F. E. Hübsch, Berlin 1928.
- Der Krankenhausbau der Gegenwart im In- und Ausland. Wirtschaft, Organisation und Technik. J. Hoffmann, Stuttgart 1932.

== Literature ==
- Sächsisches Staatsministerium des Innern (ed.): Hubert Ritter und die Baukunst der zwanziger Jahre in Leipzig (= Schriftenreihe für Baukultur, Architektur, Denkmalpflege, Reihe A, Band 1). Staatsministerium des Innern, Dresden 1993, ISBN 3-930380-00-5.
- «Eine Wohnung für alle», Geschichte des kommunalen Wohnungsbaus in Leipzig 1900—2000. Leipzig, Pro Leipzig e.V., 2000. — S. 52-70. — ISBN 3-9807201-1-X
- Guy Thewes, City Planning as an Instrument of the National Socialist "Germanization" Policy: Hubert Ritter's Development Plan for Luxembourg, in: Endangered Cities: Military Power and Urban Societies in the Era of the World Wars, ed. by Marcus Funck and Roger Chickering, Brill Academic Publishers 2004, ISBN 0-391-04196-7, pp. 161–176
- Leonhardt, Peter (2007). Moderne in Leipzig. Architektur und Städtebau 1918-1933. Leipzig: Pro Leipzig. ISBN 978-3-936508-29-1.
- Stefan Heinz, Der andere Ritter - Über den wichtigen Leipziger Baurat in den Jahren nach 1933. In: Leipziger Blätter 68 (2016), p. 19–21. Article about Ritter in the years after 1933 (in German)
- Wolfram Hagspiel, Lexikon der Kölner Architekten. Vom Mittelalter bis zum 20. Jahrhundert, Böhlau Verlag, Wien / Köln 2022, ISBN 978-3-412-52447-0, p. 168f.
