= Leipzig Museum of Ethnography =

Museum in Leipzig, Germany

Coordinates: 51°20′13″N 12°23′18″E

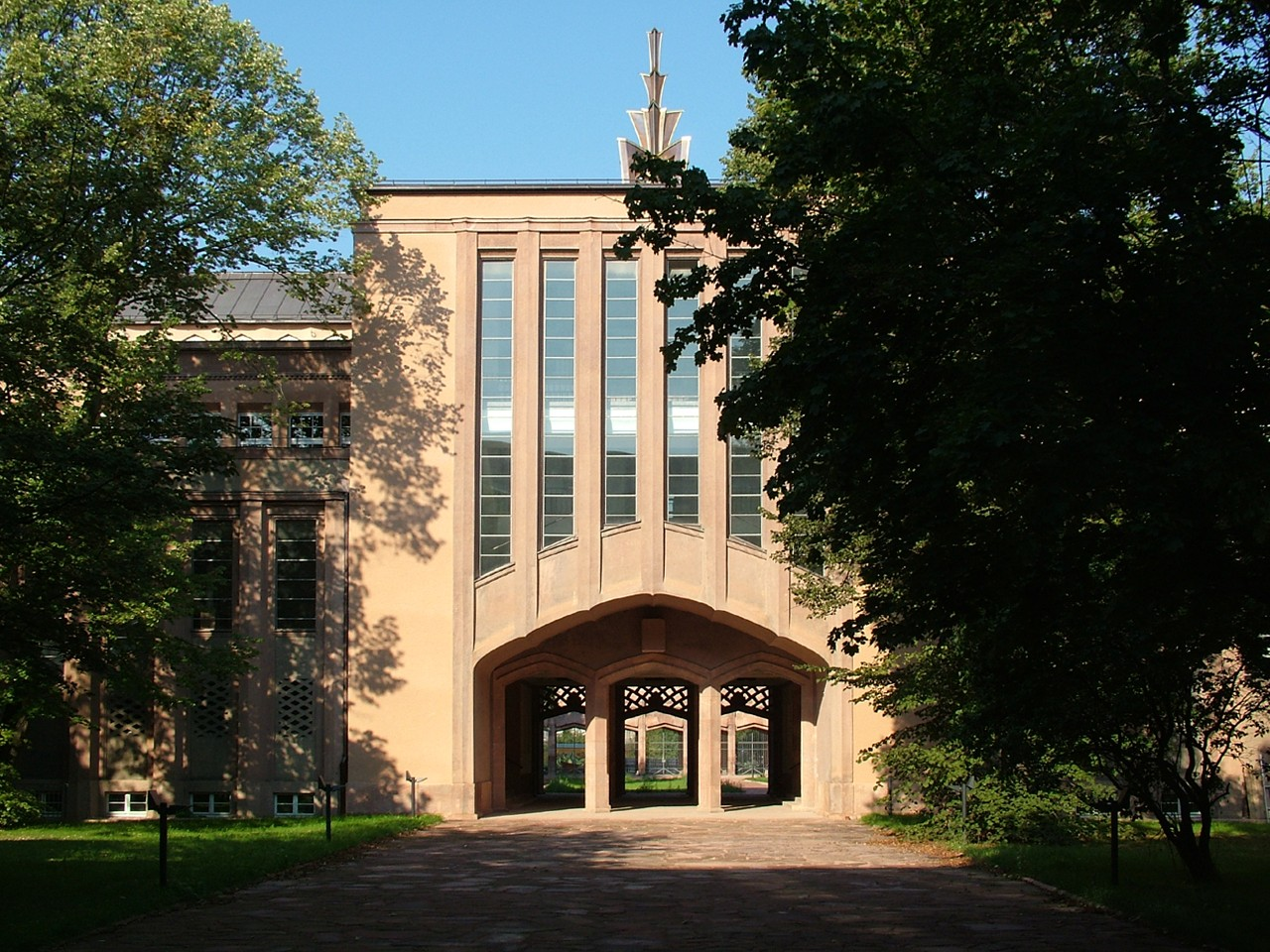
The New Grassi Museum, second courtyard.

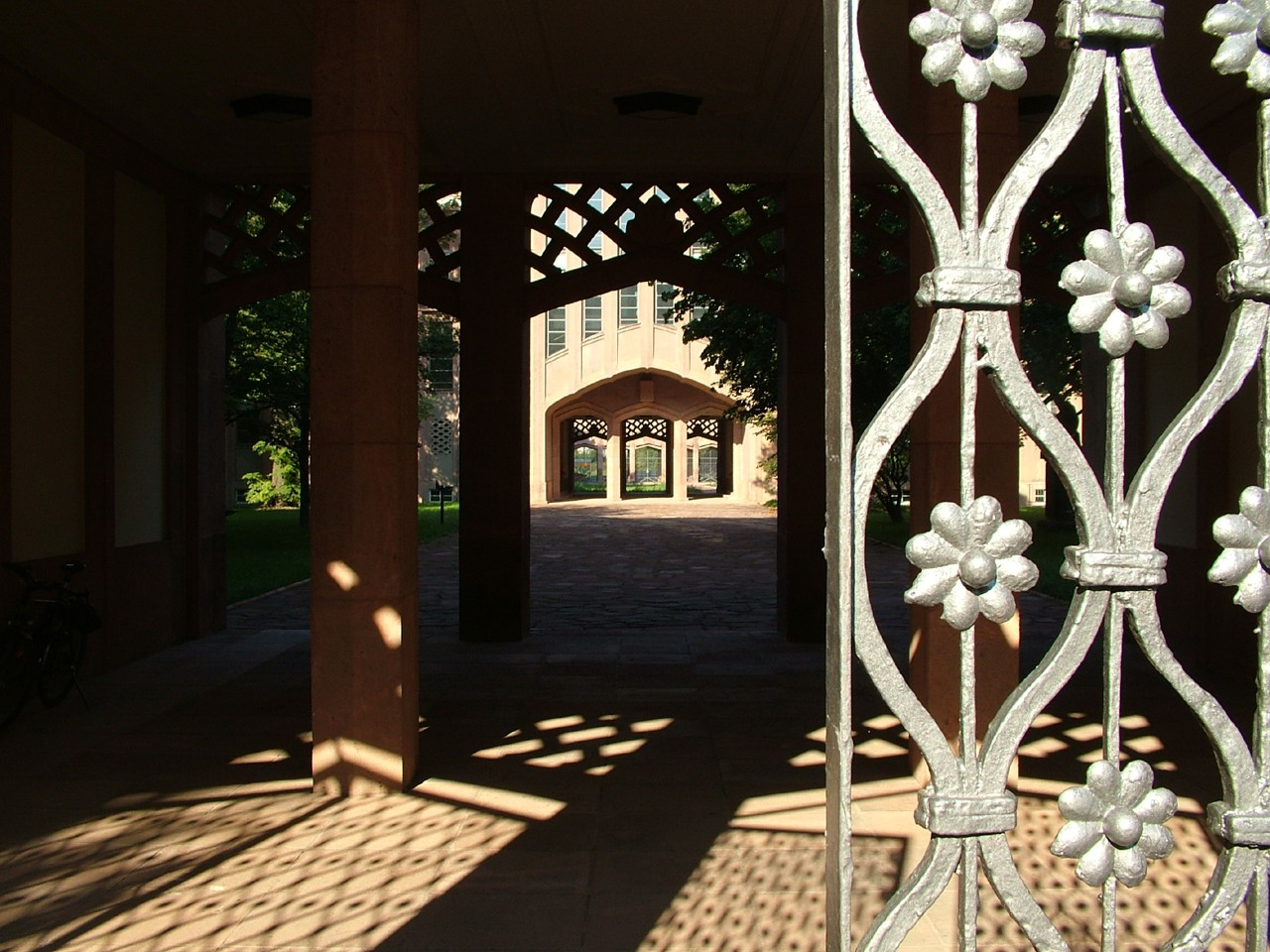
The New Grassi Museum, as seen from the Johannis Cemetery.

The Leipzig Museum of Ethnography (German: Museum für Völkerkunde zu Leipzig) is a large ethnographic museum in Leipzig, Germany, also known as the Grassi Museum of Ethnology. Today it is part of the Grassi Museum, an institution which also includes the Museum of Applied Arts and the Museum of Musical Instruments, based in a large building on the Johannisplatz.

The Leipzig Museum of Ethnography is one of three museums in the Saxon State Ethnographical Collections which belong to the Dresden State Art Collections.

== History ==
The museum traces its origins to the historian, librarian and court counsellor Gustav Klemm, whose cultural historical collection found a permanent home in the newly founded museum in 1869, shortly after his death. At first it was provisionally kept in former chemical laboratories in Leipzig. The collection was expanded in the following decades, and exhibitions were held in various buildings across the city, organised by the Association of the Museum of Ethnography. In 1895 the collection moved into the Old Grassi Museum on the Königsplatz, built over three years specifically for this purpose, though now home to the municipal library. The city of Leipzig took over the museum in 1904. In 1929 it moved into the New Grassi Museum on the Johannisplatz, whose construction had begun in 1925.

The museum closed at the outbreak of World War II. The building was severely hit by a bombing raid in 1943, which destroyed 30,000 objects. Rebuilding began in 1947, with the first permanent exhibitions reopened in 1954. Damage to the central heating forced the closure of the museum from 1981 to 1985. Since 1991 the museum has been run by the Saxon State Ministry of Science and Art. In 1994 the German postal service issued a memorial stamp to commemorate the museum's 125th anniversary. The New Grassi Museum was renovated from 2000 to 2005, necessitating the closure of the main Ethnography Museum during that time, though a small exhibition was held elsewhere. The museum was gradually reopened from 2005 to 2009.

The museum is a member of the Konferenz Nationaler Kultureinrichtungen, a union of more than twenty cultural institutions in the former East Germany.

In 2004 the museum formed the Saxon State Ethnographical Collections in partnership with the ethnological museums of Dresden and Herrnhut.

In the 21st century, the museum is often referred to as the Grassi Museum of Ethnology in English.

== Collection ==
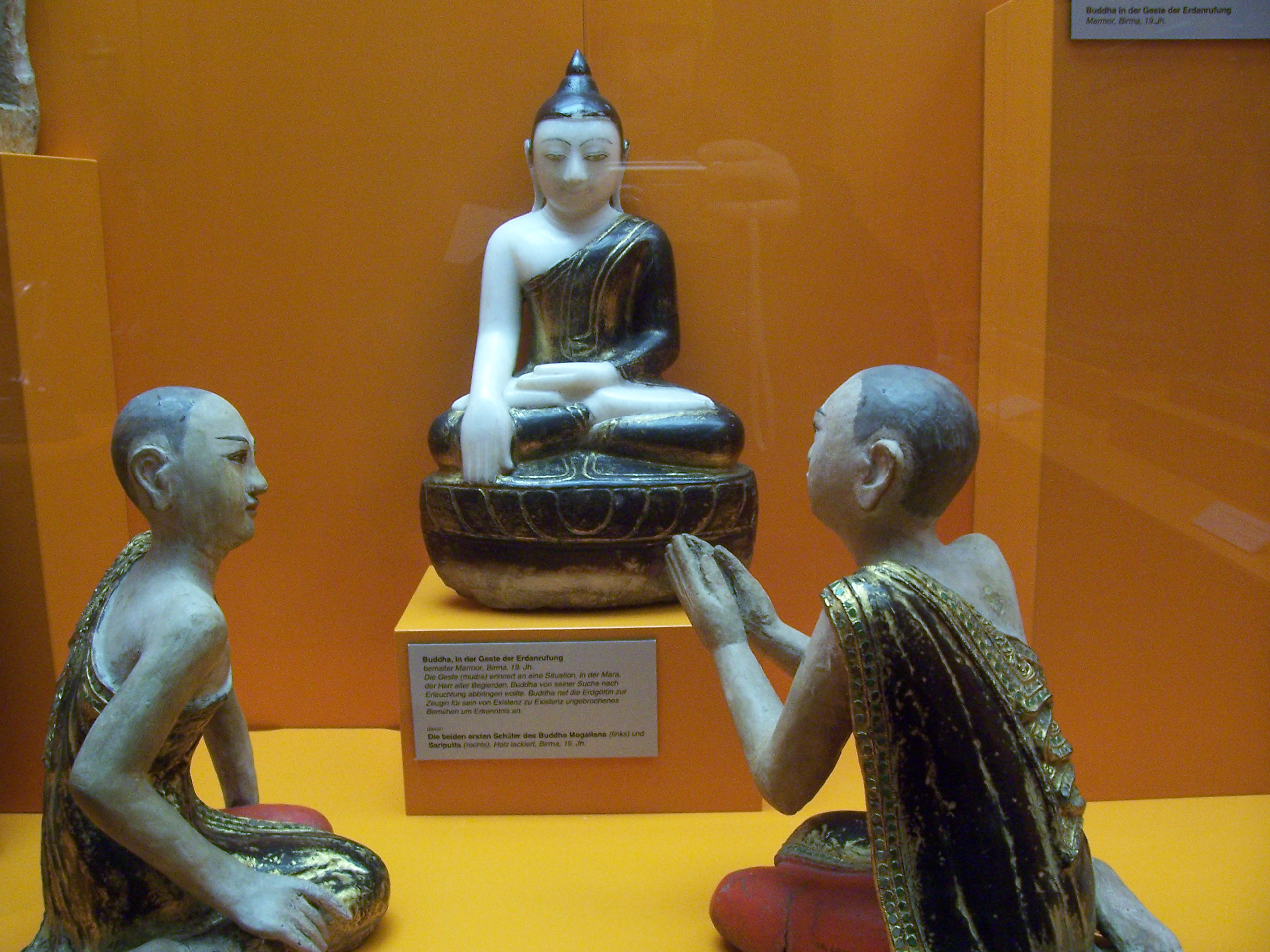
The Buddha with Maudgalyayana and Sariputta.

With over 200,000 objects it is among the largest ethnographic collections in Germany. Items include:

East Asia

Over 30,000 objects, such as:

- The Japanese collection of Karl Rathgen, including tsubas and Japanese woodcuts;
- The collection of Hermann Speck von Sternburg, with Tibetan thangkas and religious sculptures, and Chinese "dragon robes";
- A Taiwanese collection with over 300 artefacts from the island's early inhabitants.

Southeast Asia

11,000 objects, mostly from Indonesia, Thailand and Burma, also including 169 Malaysian artefacts of the Semang and Senoi people; Batak items from Sumatra; Kalimantan and Philippine objects once owned by the Meyer family.

South Asia

Domestic, agricultural and artistic objects from what are now Kerala and Tamil Nadu in south India; Sinhalese items from the east coast and central highlands of Sri Lanka; over 100 theatrical masks (mostly kolam) from the island's south-west coast. Also included are the findings of the explorer Egon Freiherr von Eickstedt, who encountered the Vedda of Sri Lanka, the Sora of east-central India (Orissa), the Andamanese, and the Nicobarese.

Oceania

Around 20,000 objects from Melanesia, including the former German South Sea Protectorate; Fijian objects purchased in 1885 from the Museum Godeffroy.

Australia

Items from the east coast of Queensland; a collection of shields from a rainforest region near a goldfield, assembled in the 19th century during the start of the Gold Rush; Arrernte and Loritja items from Central Australia; a Tiwi collection; some stone artefacts from Tasmania.

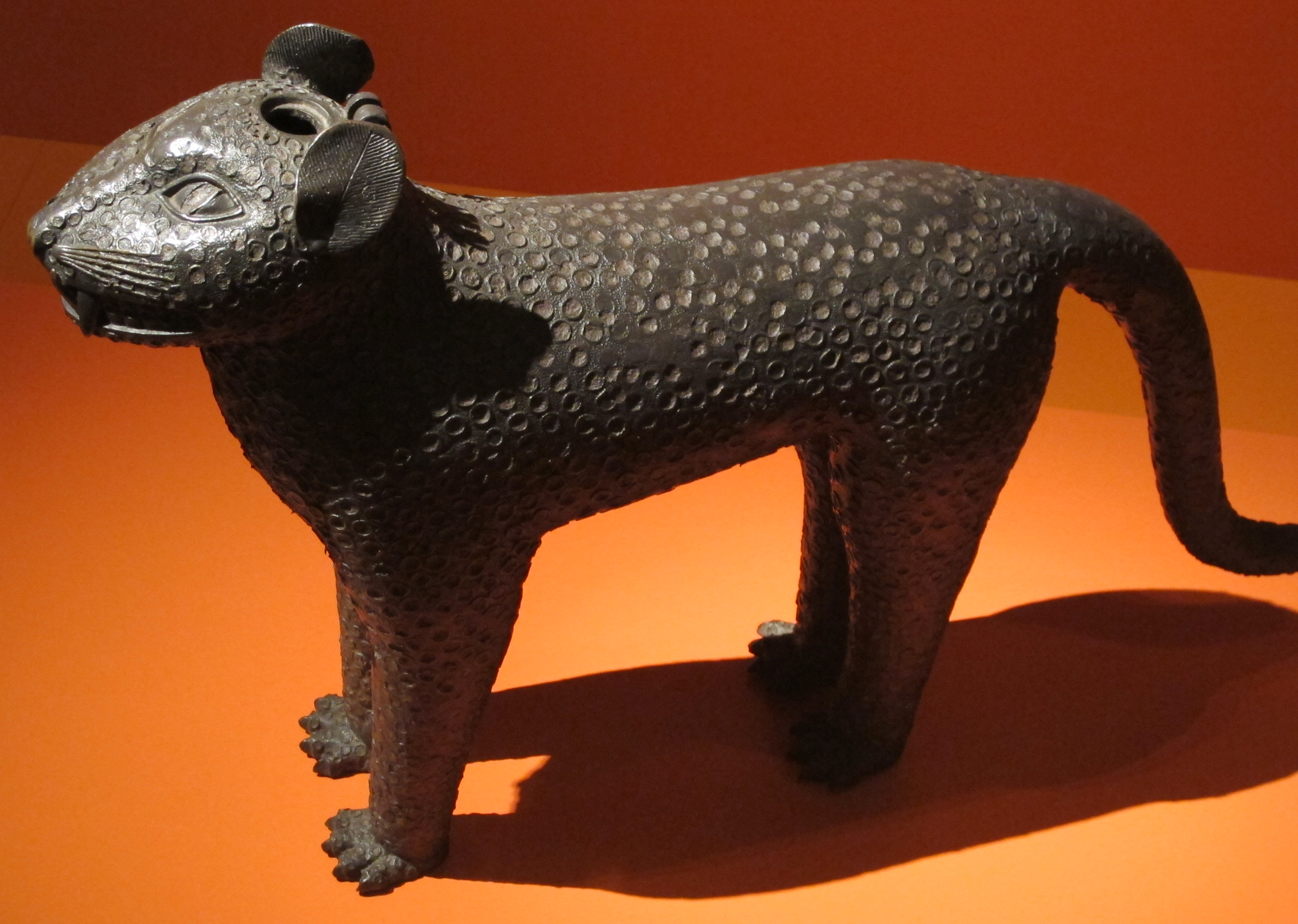
Benin bronze leopard from the 18th century

Others

One highlight from Northern Asia is a complete Evenk shaman's costume. There are also large African, American, Near Eastern and European collections.
