= Rundling (Leipzig) =

Housing estate in Leipzig, Germany

Coordinates: 51.296214°N 12.393511°E

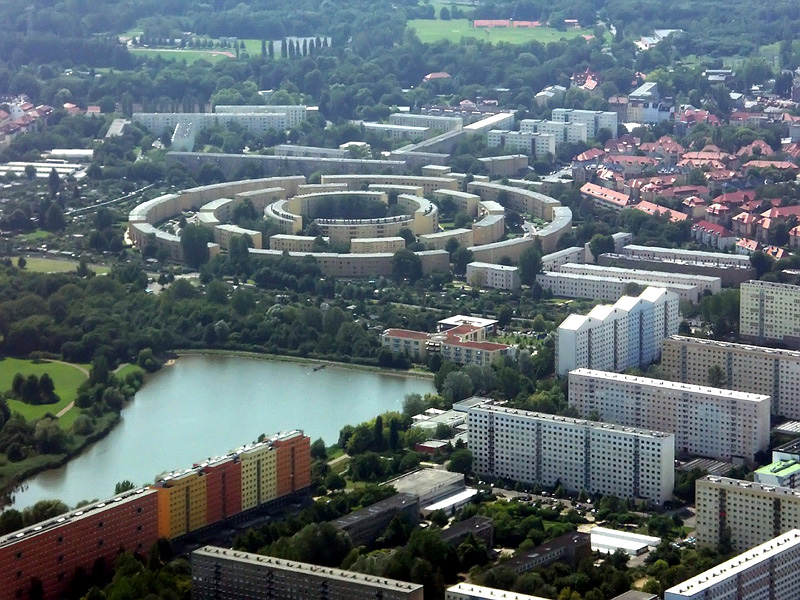
Aerial view (2008)

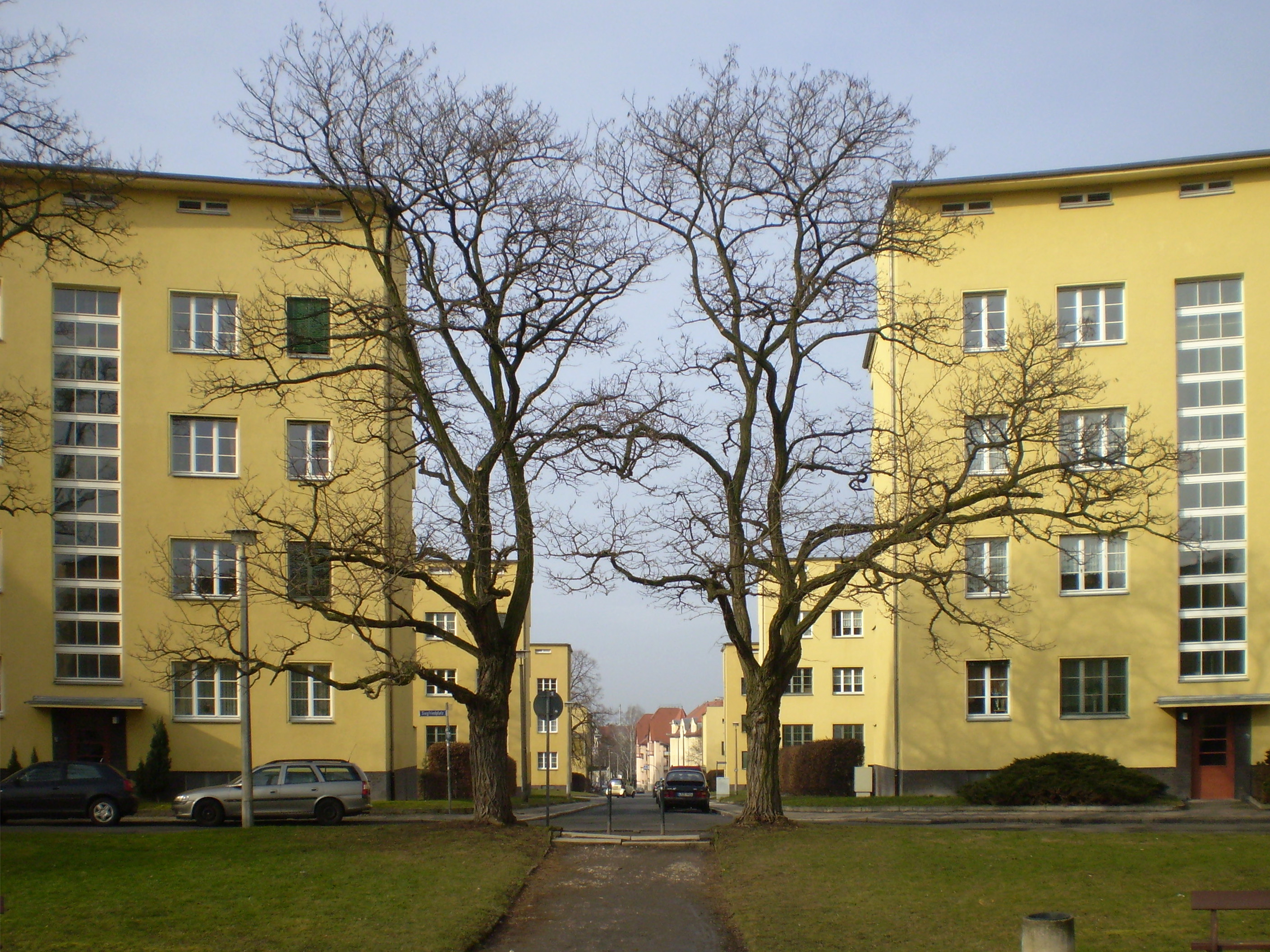
The western axis (2009)

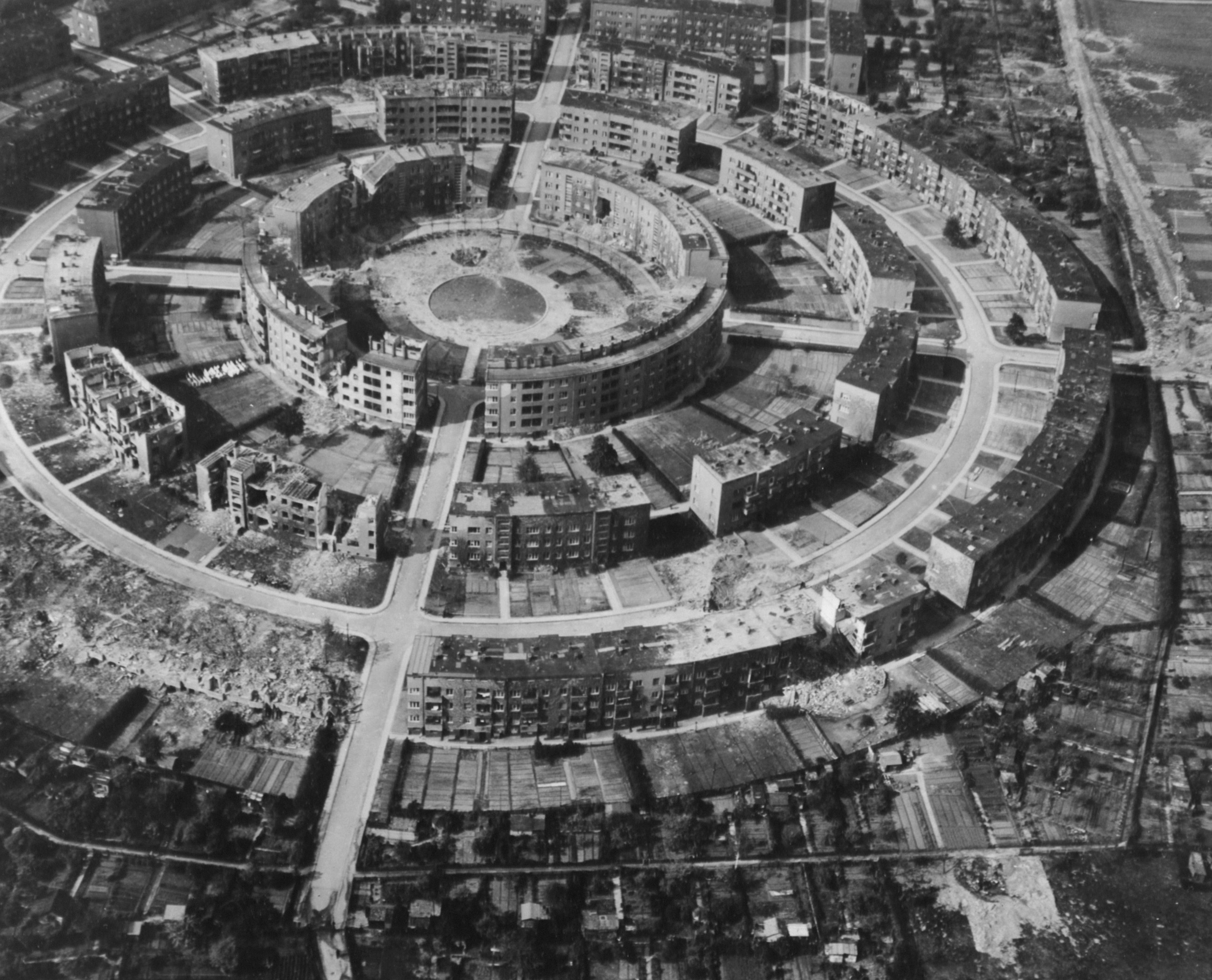
Aerial photo 1945

The Rundling, also called "Nibelungensiedlung", is a circular housing estate in the southern part of Leipzig in the Lößnig neighborhood.

At a time of great housing shortage, the housing complex was built in 1929/30 by the Leipzig architect and city planning officer Hubert Ritter. Ritter built 24 houses in a row construction on a flat hill on what was then the outskirts of the city, arranged in the form of three concentric rings. The outer ring has a diameter of 300 meters (985 ft.). Ritter emphasized the hilltop location by designing the inner ring to have four floors instead of three. Two main axes perpendicular to each other and some side entrances open up the area for traffic. The western entrance is emphasized by two front buildings with neighborhood shops on the ground floor areas. The houses in the two outer rings are accessed from the circular Nibelungenring between them, while those in the inner ring are accessed from the central Siegfriedplatz.

The buildings were designed in the New Objectivity style. According to the architectural historian Winfried Nerdinger, the Rundling is a "symbol of the ideals of the Neues Bauen style of the Weimar Republic". In the city's housing committee, there was controversy over flat and steep roofs, with Leipzig's Mayor Karl Rothe among the critics of the flat roof. Hubert Ritter was only able to convince the committee of the design at the next meeting by proving that the flat roof was cheaper than the steep roof.

624 apartments were created with eleven differently tailored floor plans of different sizes and always designed with the aspect of optimal lighting conditions in mind, for example no living rooms facing north. The Siegfriedplatz in the center of the complex, planned by the city garden director Nikolaus Molzen (1881–1954), received a large paddling pool for the children of the settlement. According to the original planning, a church or other special building was to be erected here.

The Rundling suffered heavy damage during World War II. The paddling pool was gutted after the war and initially used for gardening, then a bed area was created and the pool was abandoned. In 1965/66 the buildings were partially rebuilt. During the comprehensive renovation of the listed complex from 1993 until 1997, five blocks destroyed in the war were rebuilt. The Leipziger Wohnungs- und Baugesellschaft, the municipal real estate company of the city of Leipzig, was awarded the Deutscher Bauherrenpreis for this redevelopment.

== Literature ==
- Pro Leipzig e.V. und Leipziger Wohnungs- und Baugesellschaft mbH, ed. (2000), "Die Nibelungensiedlung", "Eine Wohnung für alle". Geschichte des Kommunalen Wohnungsbaus in Leipzig 1900-2000, Leipzig: Pro Leipzig, pp. 59f, ISBN 3-9807201-1-X
- Horst Riedel: Rundling Lößnig In: Stadtlexikon Leipzig von A bis Z. PRO LEIPZIG, Leipzig 2012, ISBN 978-3-936508-82-6 p,. 326 f. (in German)
- Peter Leonhardt, Moderne in Leipzig. Architektur und Städtebau 1918 bis 1933, Pro Leipzig, Leipzig 2007, ISBN 978-3-936508-29-1, pp. 52–54, in German
