= Grundschule an der Herrnstraße =

Building in Munich, Germany

Coordinates: 48.136599°N 11.581371°E

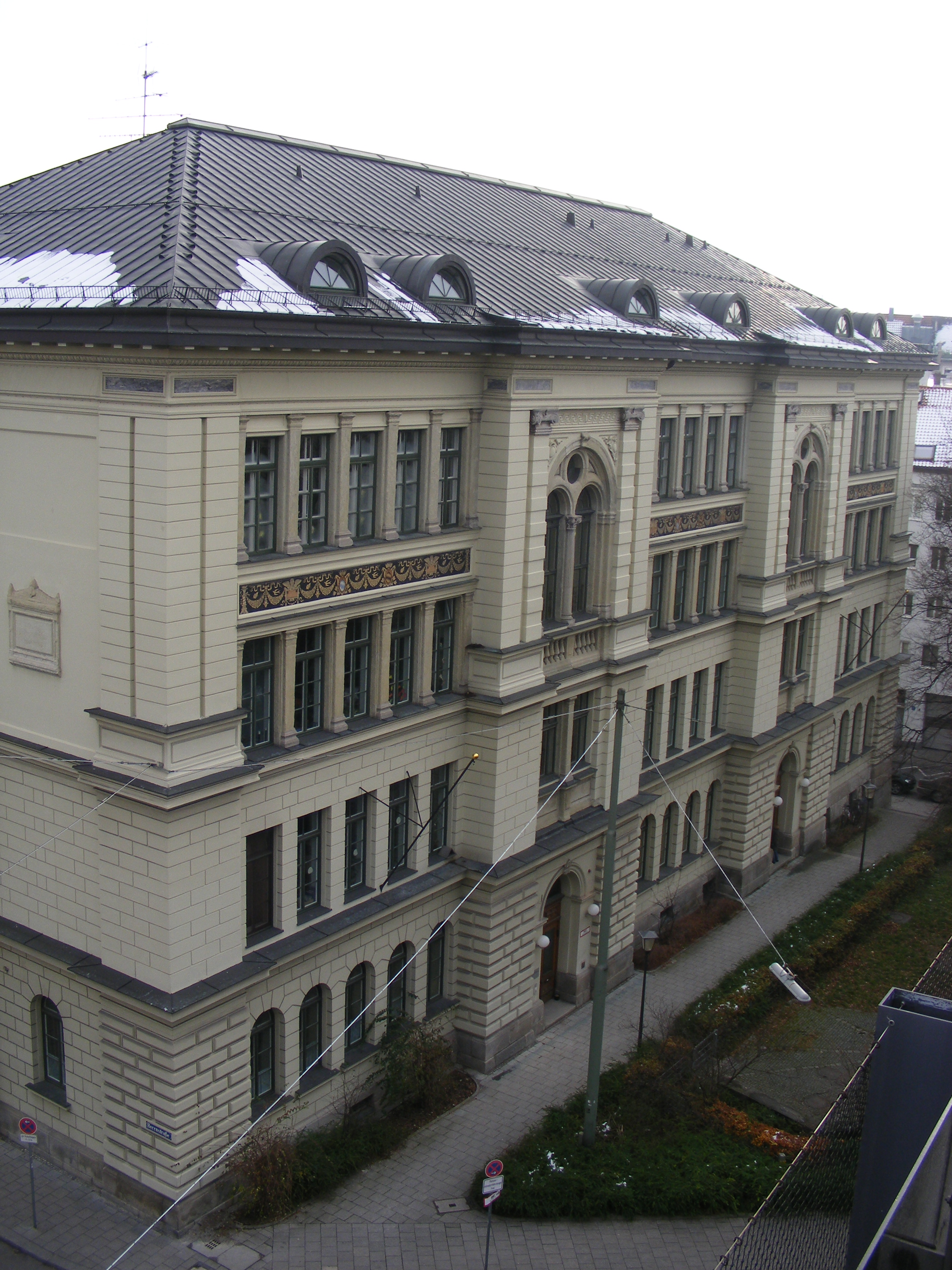
Front view of the school (2007)

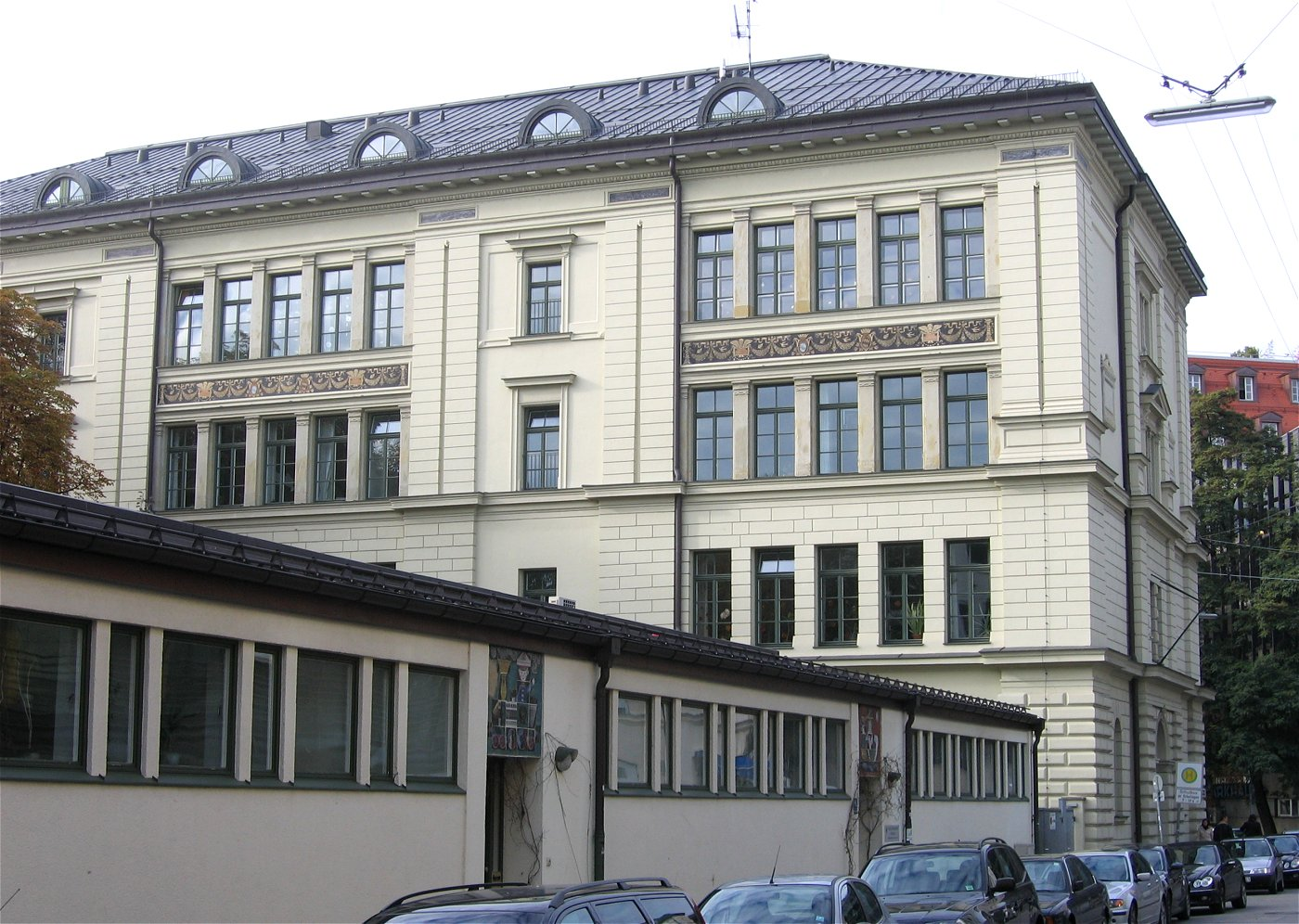
Rear view (2007)

Grundschule an der Herrnstraße (Public school on Herrnstraße) was founded in 1882. The school building is one of the oldest still intact Volksschule (public school building) in Munich and, at the same time, one of the oldest school buildings in the city. It is located in the northeastern Graggenauviertel of the old town.

== History ==
The school was opened in 1882, in the middle of the old town as the second Protestant public school in Munich after the, Herzog-Wilhelm School on Glockenbach, built in 1848 by Frank Jakob Kreuter. The school survived the Second World War unscathed, although half of the houses in the city center were bombed.

After the Second World War, Catholic students were also allowed to attend school. The first 40 Deutsche Mark were handed over there to the citizens of Munich after the currency reform in 1948. In the post-war period, up to 70 students were taught there in one classroom in shifts.

Since 1969, the school houses the mainstream school, the Grundschule an der Herrnstraße and a special school, today's Special Needs Education Center Munich. The city hoard and full-time childcare were added later. The municipal kindergarten is located on the long side of the playground in the one-storey post-war pavilion. Since 2005, the special needs educational counseling center is also in the Herrnstraße 21.

The elementary school is next to the Sinai-elementary school in the Jewish Community Center, the only one of this kind of school in the old town center. Although the number of pupils in this district has declined sharply, it has been possible to suspend the process of dissolution of the elementary school which has been initiated due to long-term unsuccessful student numbers, since there were sufficient pupils in the school year 2005/06.

== Well-known former students ==
- Andreas Baader
- Rudolph Moshammer
- Hubert Ritter
- Karl Valentin
- Konstantin Wecker
