= Konferenz Nationaler Kultureinrichtungen =

The Konferenz Nationaler Kultureinrichtungen (KNK) or Conference of National Cultural Institutions is a union of more than twenty cultural organizations in the former East Germany. It was established in 2002 in Halle.

It includes the following organizations:

- Prussian Palaces and Gardens Foundation Berlin-Brandenburg
- Kulturstiftung Dessau-Wörlitz
- Muskau Park and Schloss Branitz
- Wartburg Eisenach
- Staatliche Kunstsammlungen Dresden
- Klassik Stiftung Weimar
- Staatliches Museum Schwerin
- Bauhaus Dessau
- Kurt Weill Centre, Dessau
- Leipzig Museum of Applied Arts
- Museum der bildenden Künste, Leipzig
- Kunstmuseum Moritzburg Halle (Saale)
- Museum Lyonel Feininger, Quedlinburg
- Kunstsammlungen Chemnitz
- Lindenau Museum Altenburg
- Luthergedenkstätten in Sachsen-Anhalt
- Francke Foundations, Halle (Saale)
- Senckenberg Naturhistorische Sammlungen Dresden
- Staatliche Ethnographische Sammlungen Sachsen
- Leipzig Museum of Ethnography
- Museum of Musical Instruments of the University of Leipzig
- German Hygiene Museum, Dresden
- Ocean Museum Germany, Stralsund
- Bach-Archiv Leipzig
- Handel House, Halle (Saale)
