= Leipzig Museum of Applied Arts =

Building in Leipzig, Saxony, Germany

Coordinates: 51°20′13″N 12°23′18″E

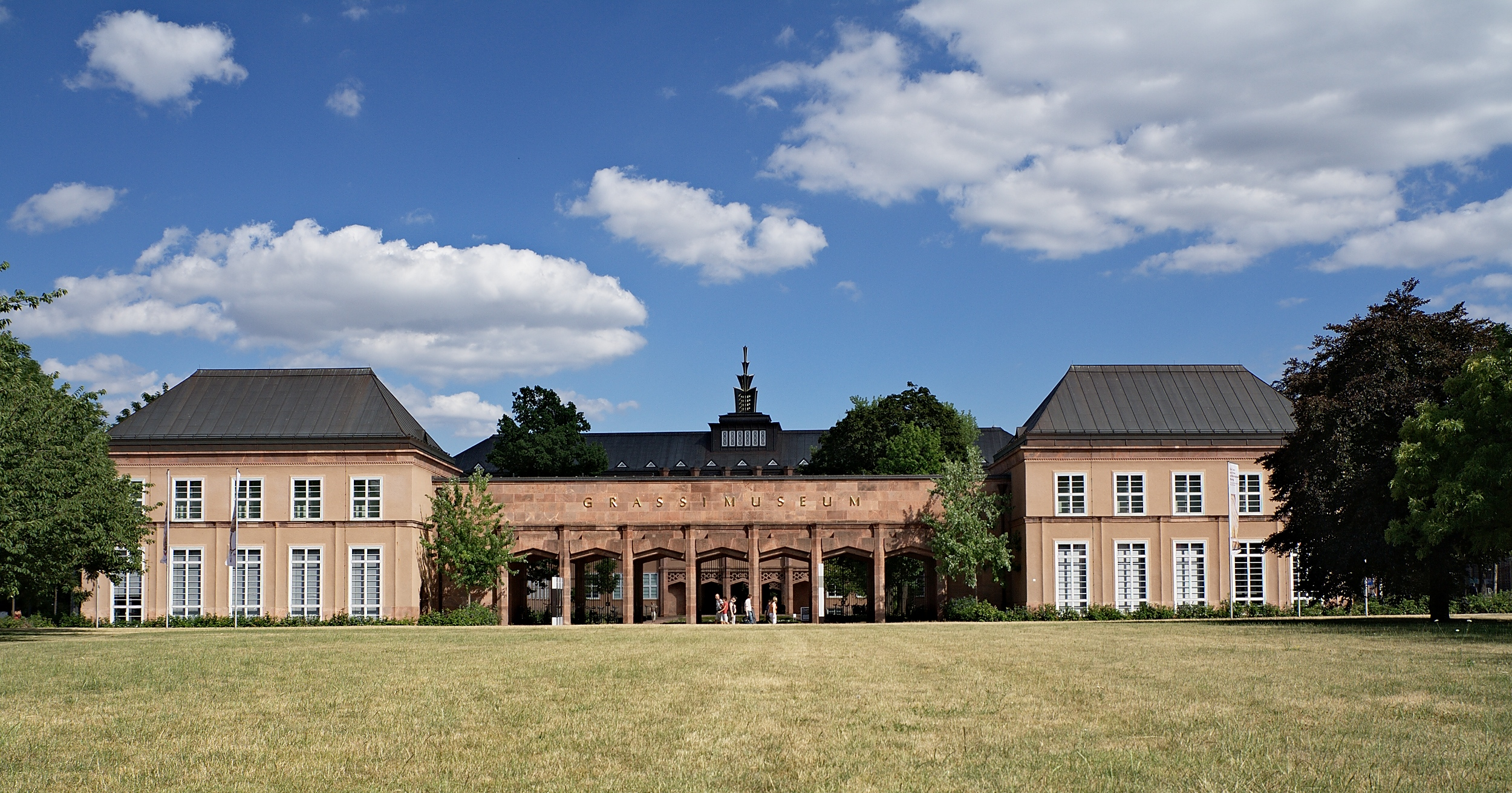
The Grassimuseum

The Museum of Applied Arts (German: Museum für Angewandte Kunst) is a museum in Leipzig, Germany. It is the second oldest museum of decorative arts in the country, founded just six years after the Kunstgewerbemuseum Berlin. Today it is part of the Grassi Museum, an institution which also includes the Museum of Ethnography and the Museum of Musical Instruments, based in a large building on the Johannisplatz.

== Collections ==
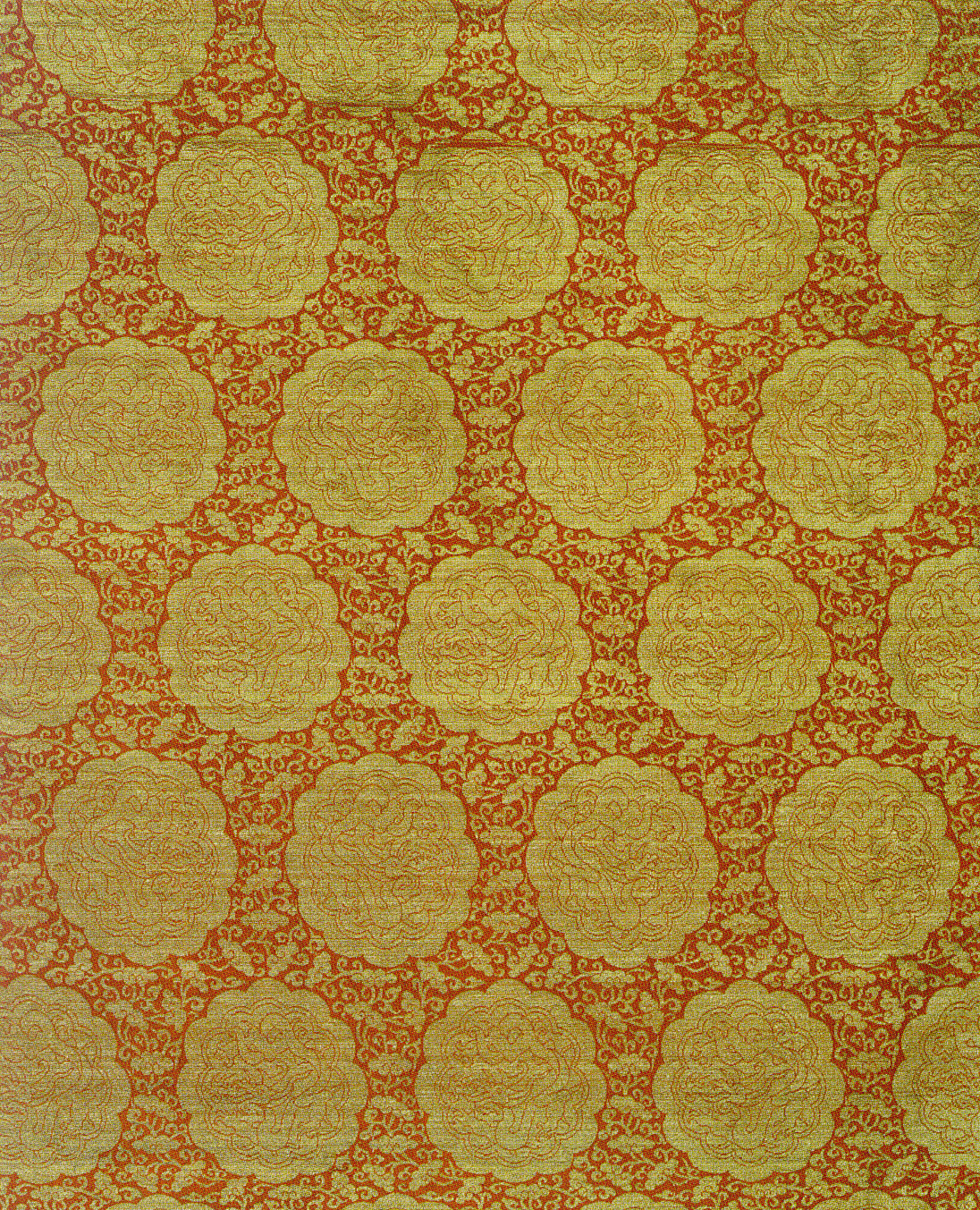
Piece of silk, Eastern Iran, late 13th or early 14th century.

The museum owns around 90,000 items, of European and non-European origin, featuring decorative art from all eras since antiquity. The collection is particularly strong on exhibits from the 1920s and '30s. The items include ceramics, textiles, glassware, metalwork, sculpture, furniture and coinage.

More than 2,000 items are on permanent display, currently split between two exhibitions: "From Antiquity to Historism" and "Asian Art". A third exhibition, "From Art Nouveau to the Present Day", is scheduled to open in late 2011. There are also special temporary exhibitions.

One highlight of the museum is the "Roman Hall", with panels salvaged from a palace in Eythra, near Leipzig, which was demolished to make way for coal mining.

There is also a graphics collection with over 50,000 works, a photographic archive of 75,000 items, and a library with around 60,000 titles.

== History ==
The museum was founded in 1874 as the Kunstgewerbemuseum (Museum of Arts and Crafts). It moved into its present location, the New Grassi Building, in 1926. Numerous exhibits were destroyed by bombs during World War II.

Between 1981 and 1994, no permanent exhibition was possible because of damage to the building. The Grassi Museum was refurbished from 2001 to 2006. The Museum of Applied Arts received its present name in 2005, and the new permanent exhibition opened in 2007.

The museum is one of around 20 so-called "Cultural Lighthouses" in the German government's Blue Book of culturally significant sites in the former East Germany. As such, it is a member of the Konferenz Nationaler Kultureinrichtungen.
