= Eberhard Burger =

German civil engineer

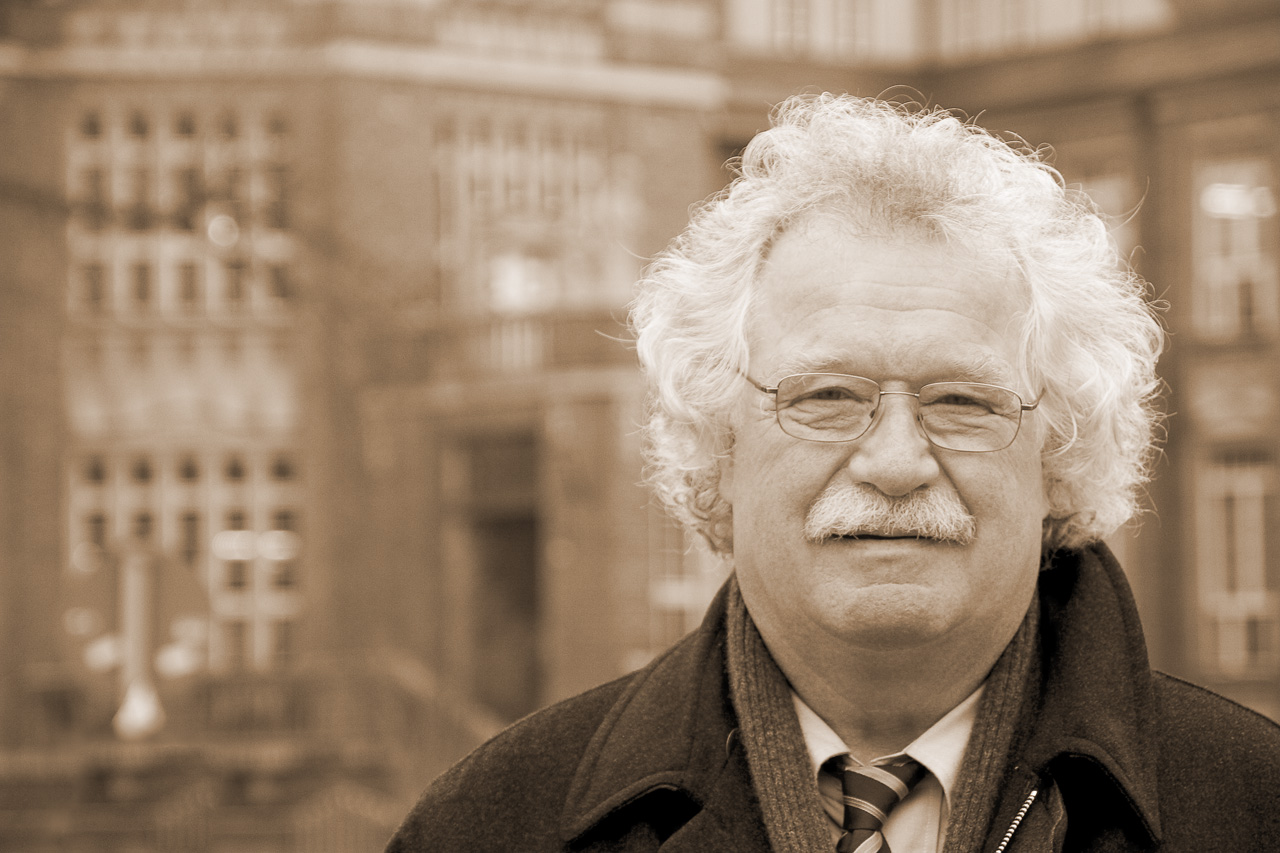
Eberhard Burger in front of the Beyer-Bau of the TU Dresden

Eberhard Burger, OBE (born 26 July 1943 in Berlin) is a German civil engineer. He is particularly active in Dresden, overseeing construction of the new Zionskirche and serving as Director of Construction for the rebuilding of the Frauenkirche from 1996 to 2005 and from 2001 to present as chairman of the Dresden Frauenkirche Foundation (Stiftung Frauenkirche Dresden). He was granted the Großes Bundesverdienstkreuz on 7 September 2007, then made an OBE in November 2007 "in recognition of his contributions to the reconstruction of the Frauenkirche and his significant contribution to the reconciliation of [the British and German] peoples in this project".

== Bibliography ==
- (in German) Eberhard Burger, Jörg Schöner; Die Frauenkirche zu Dresden, 2001, ISBN 3-930382-61-X
