= Augustus Bridge =

Bridge over the river Elbe in Dresden, Germany

Coordinates: 51.0553°N 13.7394°E

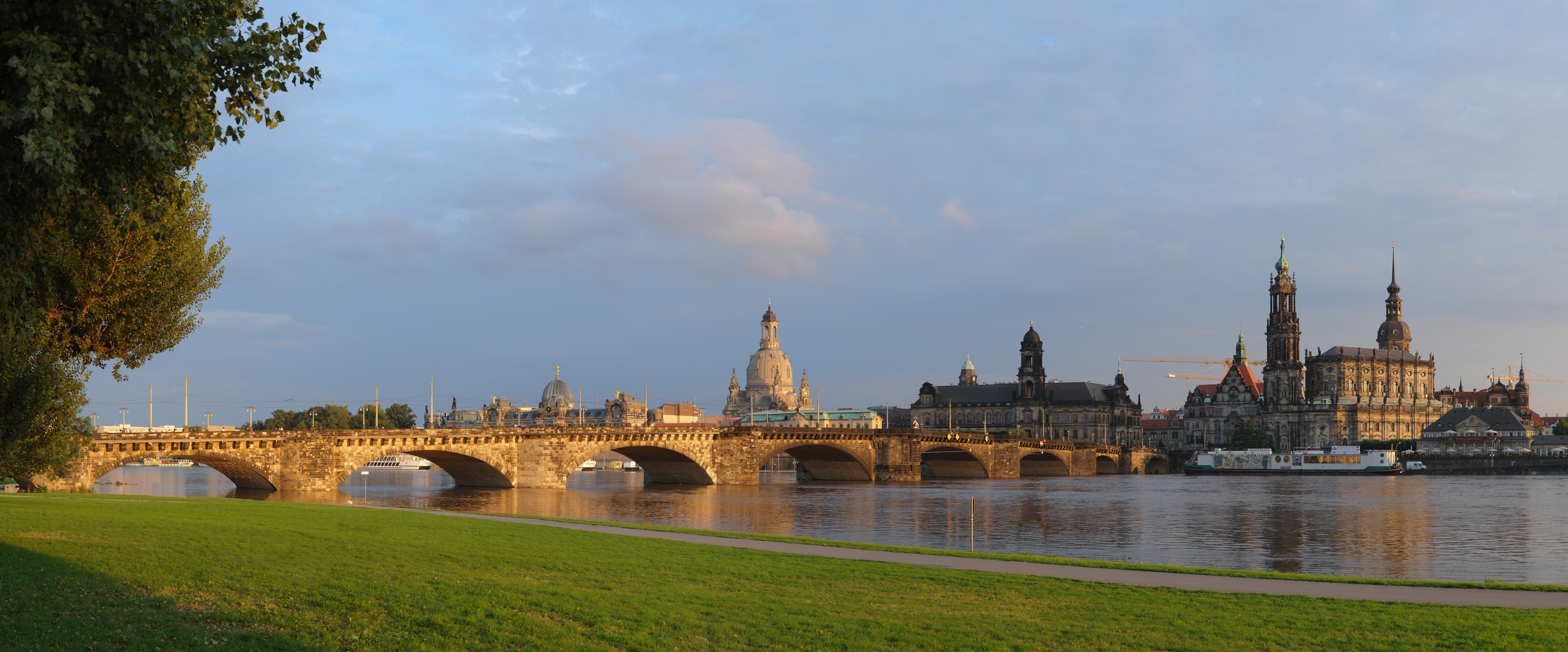
Augustus Bridge and Dresden Altstadt

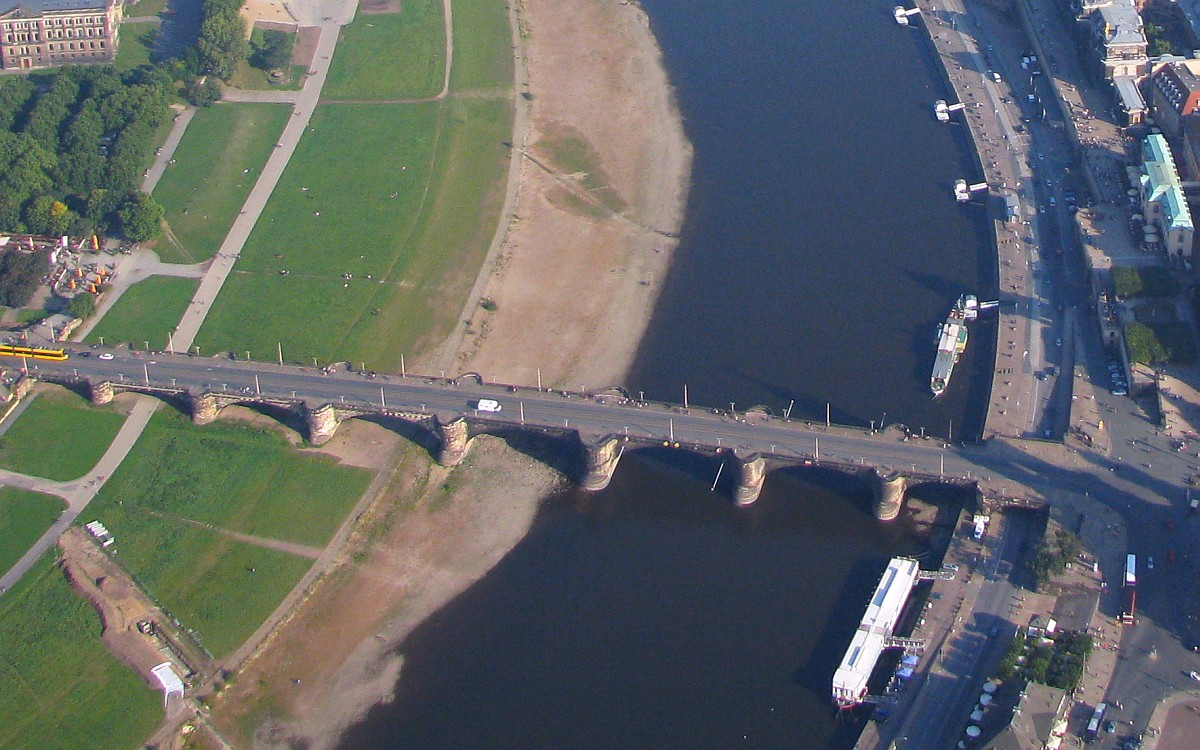
Aerial view of Augustus Bridge

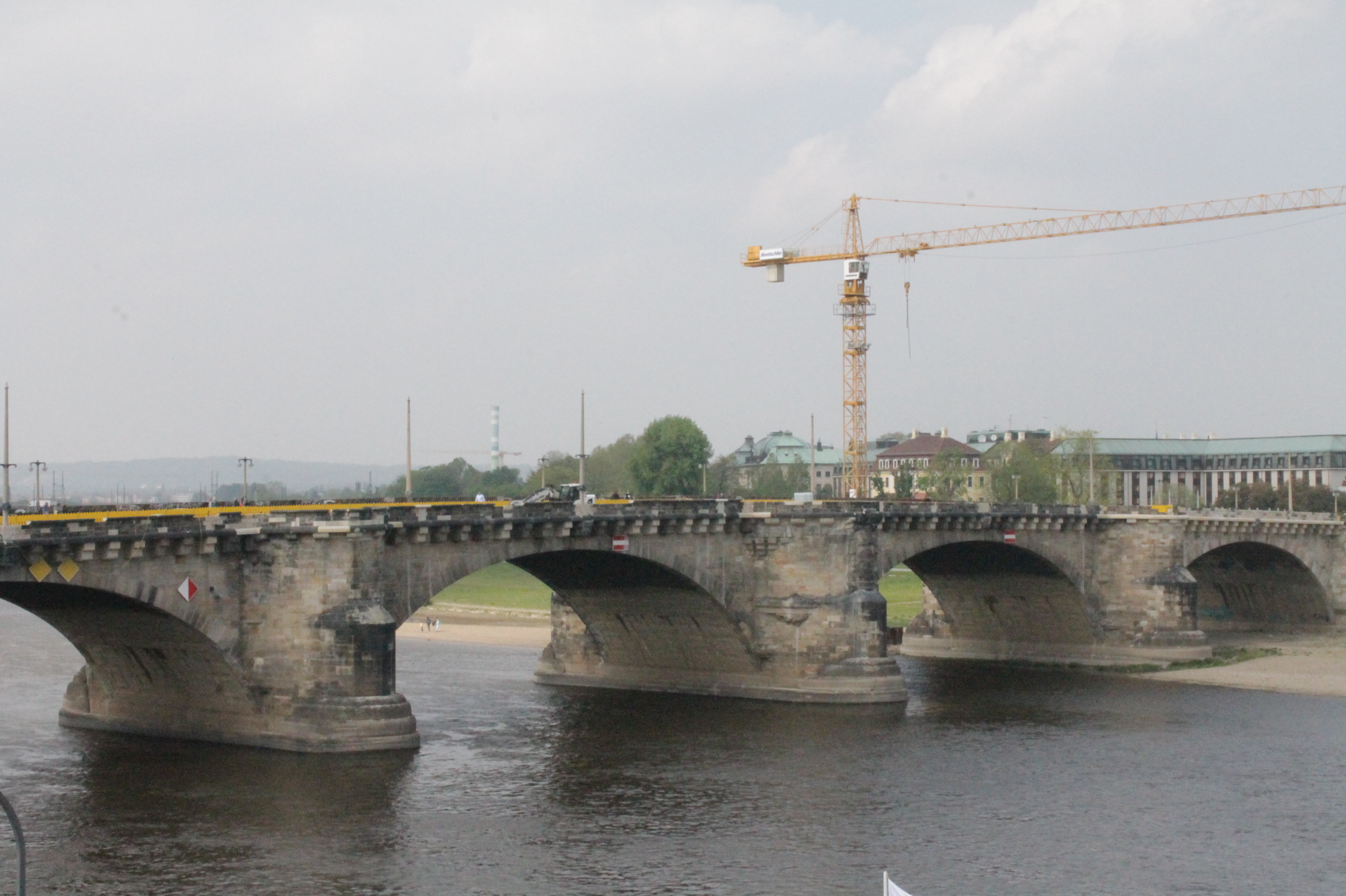
Repairing the Augustusbrucke in Dresden 2019

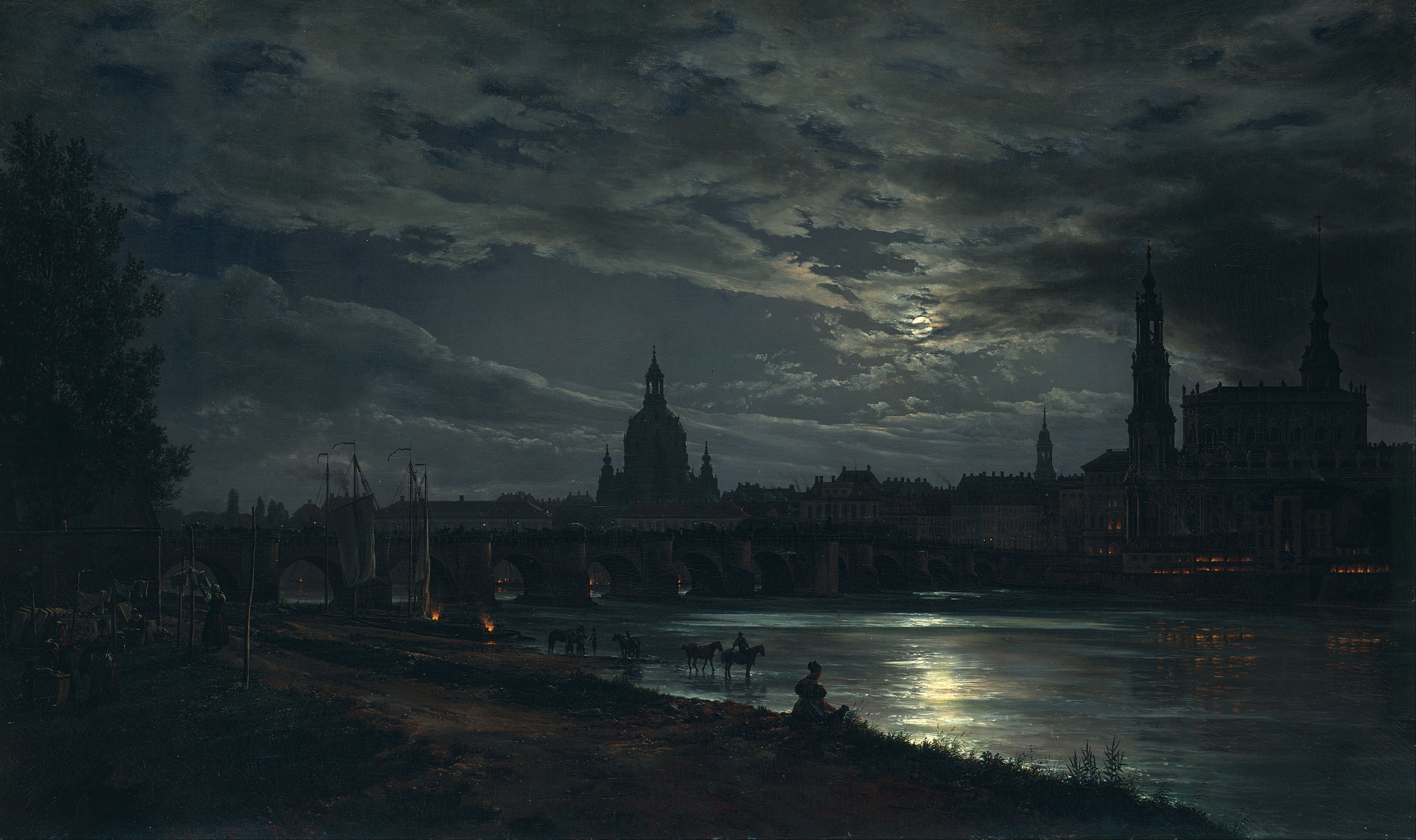
View of Dresden by Moonlight by Johan Christian Dahl, 1839

The Augustus Bridge is a bridge in the city of Dresden, in the state Saxony in Germany.

Crossing the river Elbe, the road bridge connects the Innere Neustadt in the north (right bank) with the historic city centre to the south (left bank).

In 1220, a stone bridge was constructed over the Elbe at the same location as today’s Augustus Bridge. Under Augustus II the Strong, a new sandstone bridge was built with 12 arches between 1727 and 1731. This bridge was replaced by the present, also sandstone, bridge with 9 arches in order to provide a wider opening for river traffic. It was designed by Wilhelm Kreis and Theodor Klette.

Three tram lines of the Dresdner Verkehrsbetriebe pass over the Augustus Bridge.

The current bridge was built between 1907 and 1910.
