= Grant Macdonald =

British silversmith company

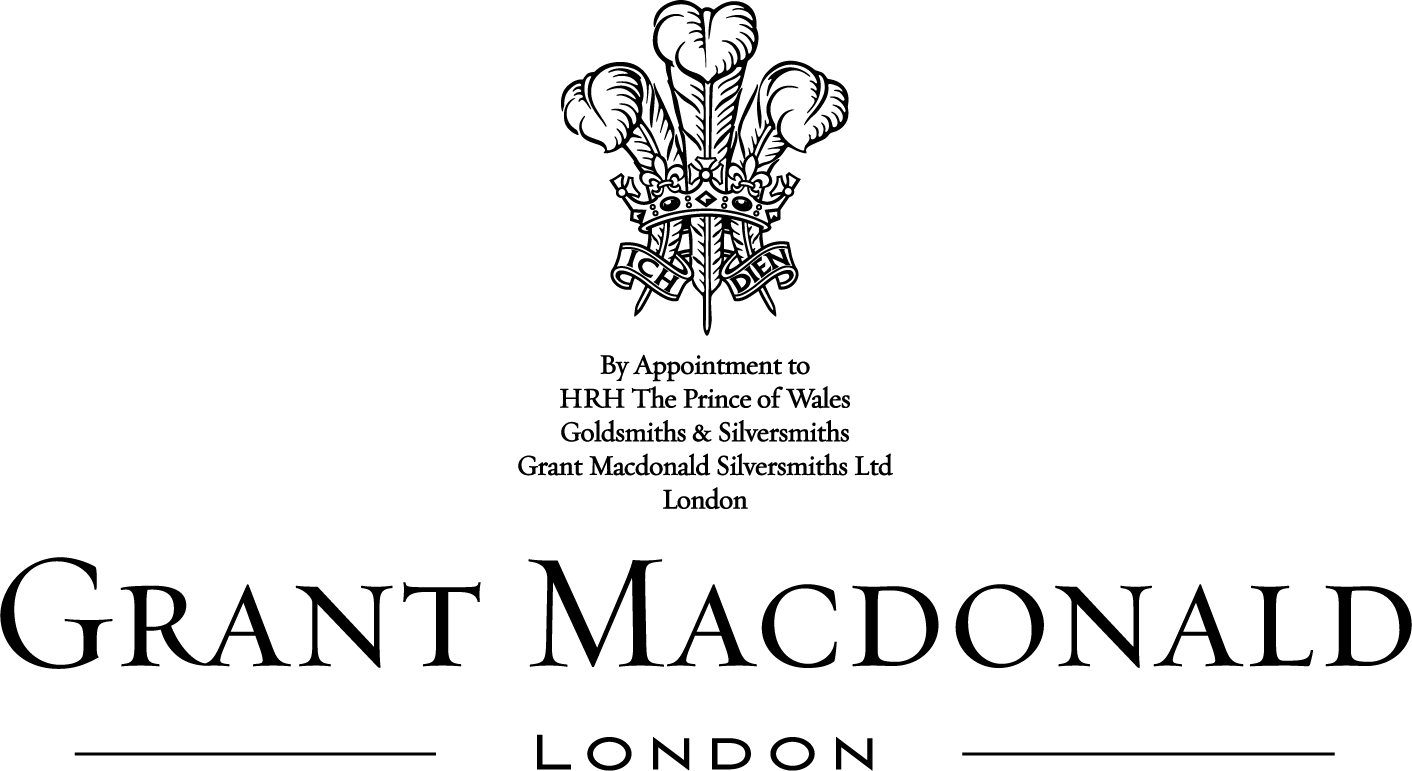
- Type: Privately held company
- Industry: Luxury goods
- Founded: Southwark, London (1969)
- Founder: Grant Macdonald
- Headquarters: London, United Kingdom
- Key people: George Macdonald (managing director)
- Website: grantmacdonald.com

Grant Macdonald is a silversmith and goldsmith company based in London.

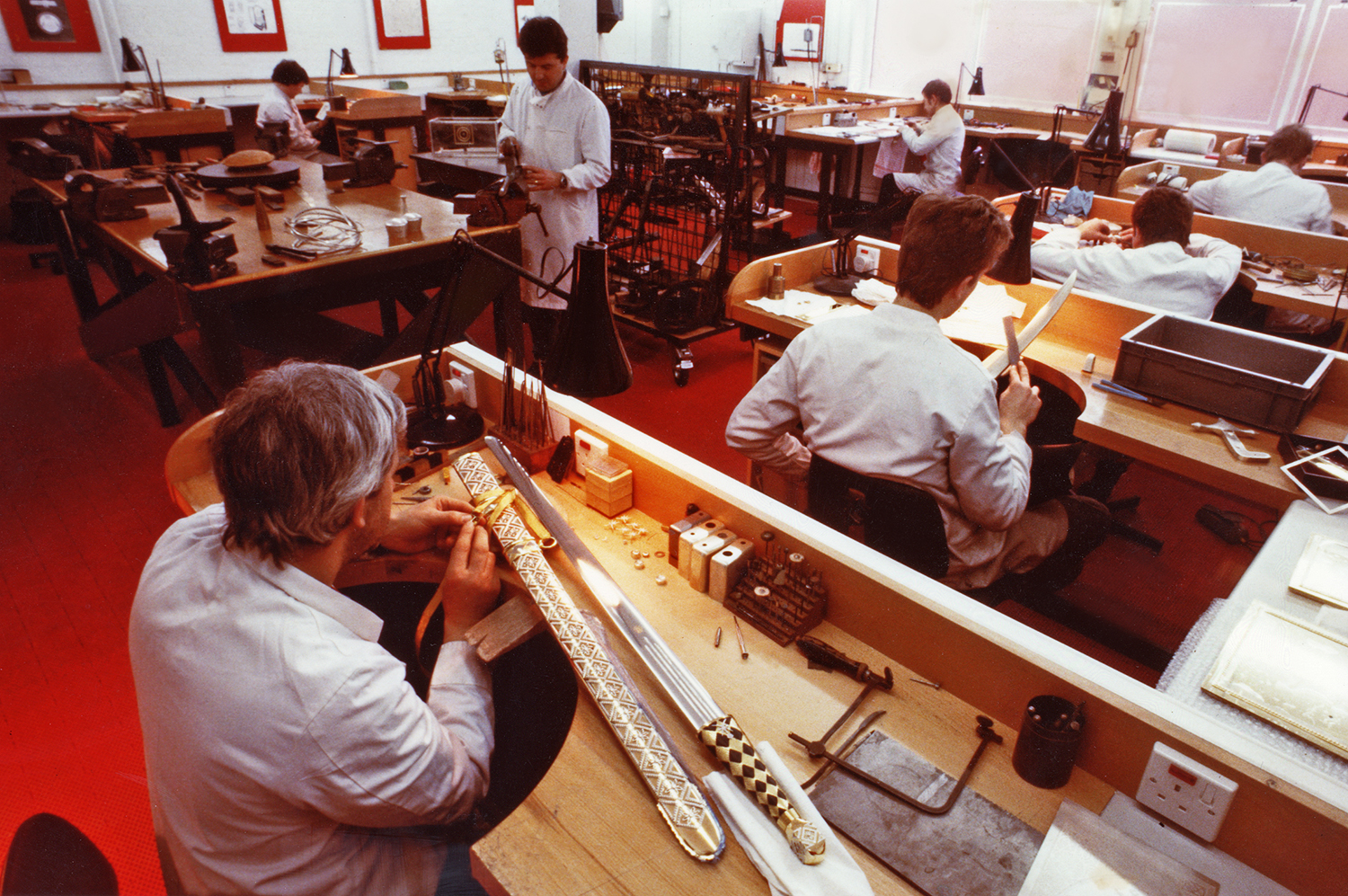
The Grant Macdonald workshop, Bear Lane 1982

== History ==
Founded in 1969 by Grant Macdonald, Grant Macdonald began as a silversmith workshop and became a limited company in 1977. By the early 1980s Grant Macdonald produced many pieces for the Middle Eastern market.

In 1998 they remade the orb and cross for the Dresden Frauenkirche which was installed in 2004. This piece was required to be made using the same materials and making process as the 18th-century original, which was destroyed by Allied bombings during World War II. Master silversmith Alan Smith took on the work of recreating the seven-meter structure, and this was very fitting as his father had been one of the Royal Air Force pilots during the raids.

In 2006, the company received The Queen's Award for Enterprise in recognition of their exports. In 2016 the company was awarded a Royal Warrant from the Prince of Wales as Goldsmiths and Silversmiths.
