= Zionskirche, Dresden =

Church buildings in Saxony, Germany

Coordinates: 51°02′09″N 13°43′02″E

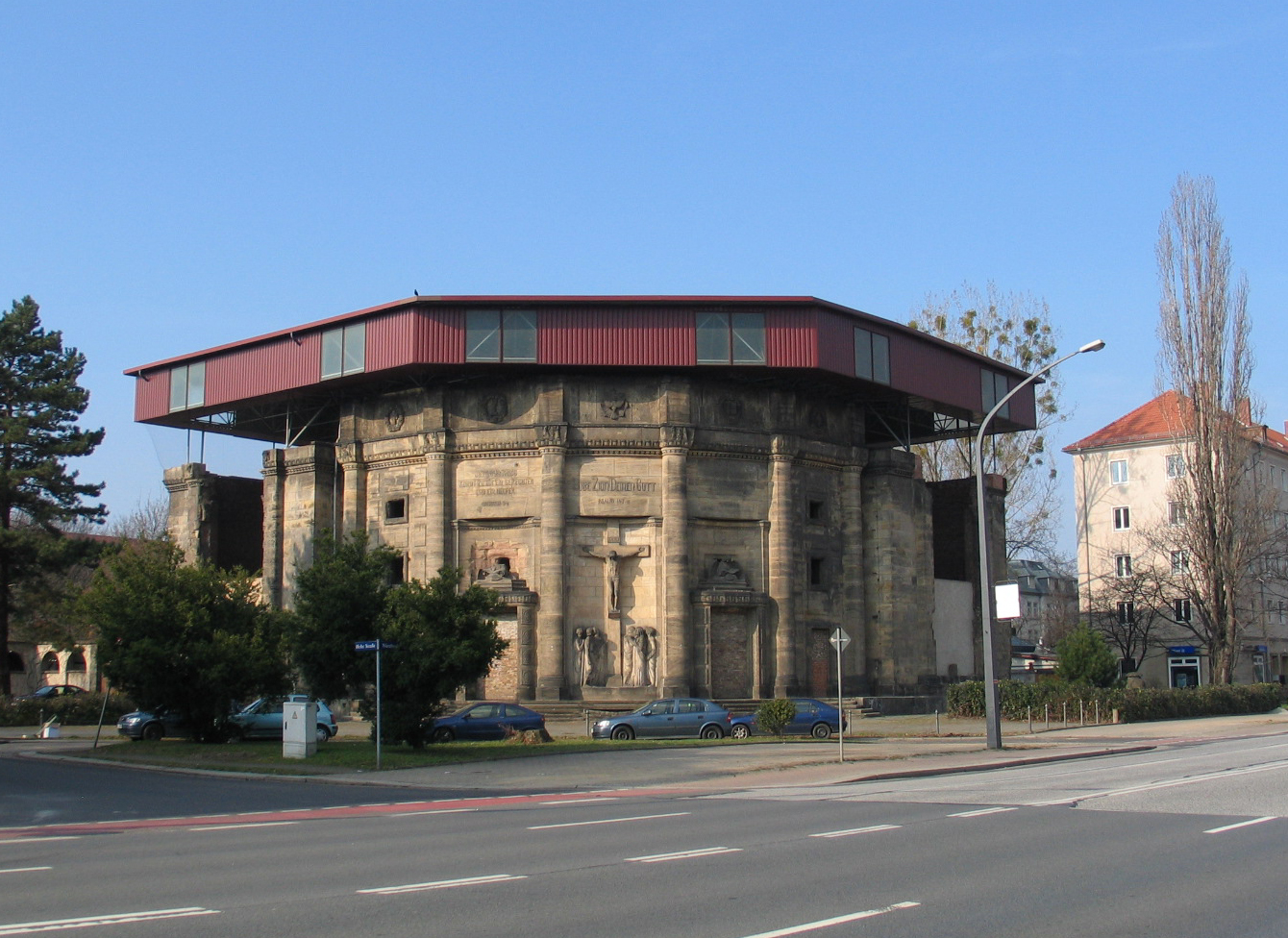
Ruins of the first church.

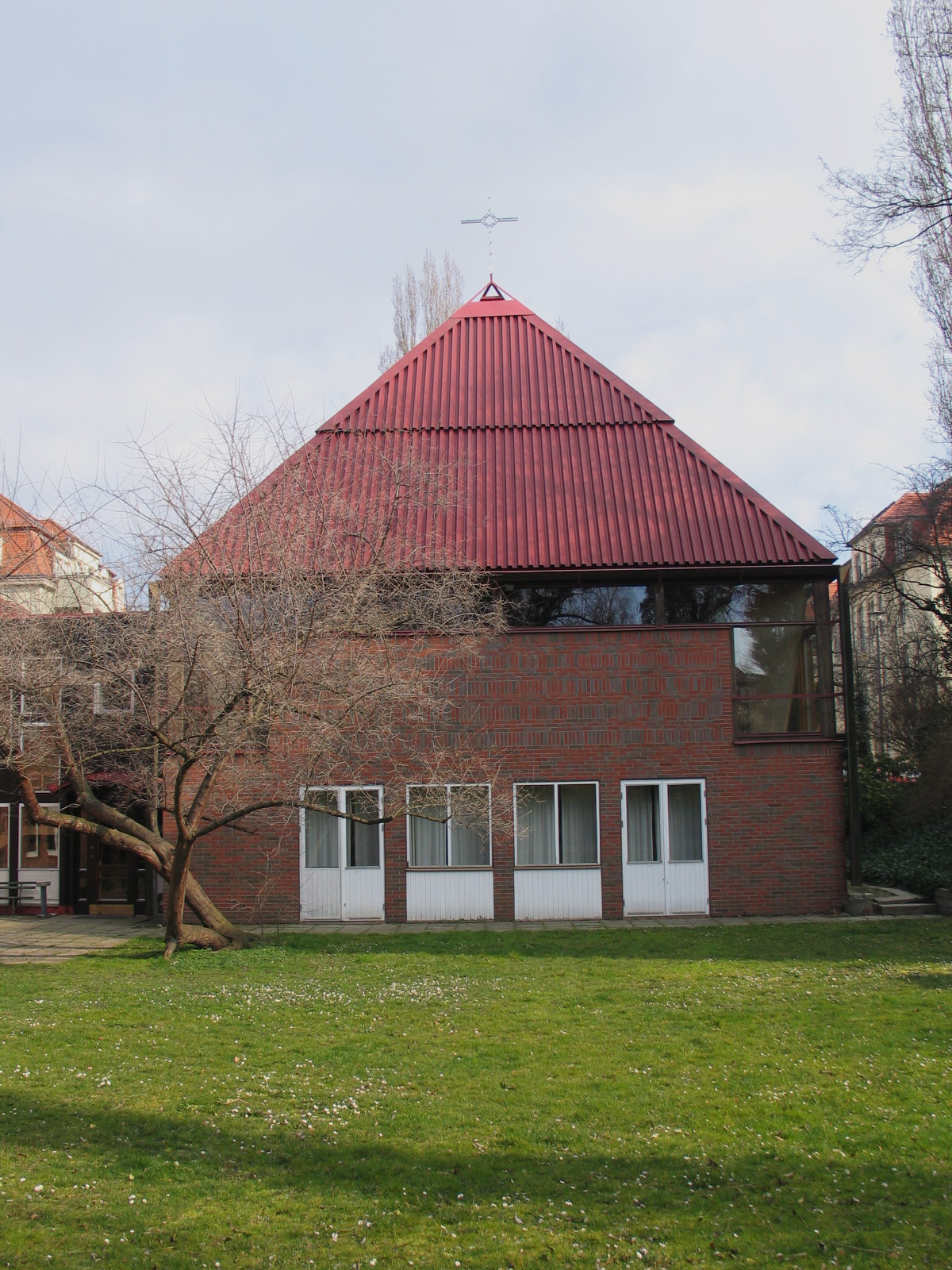
The Neue Zionskirche

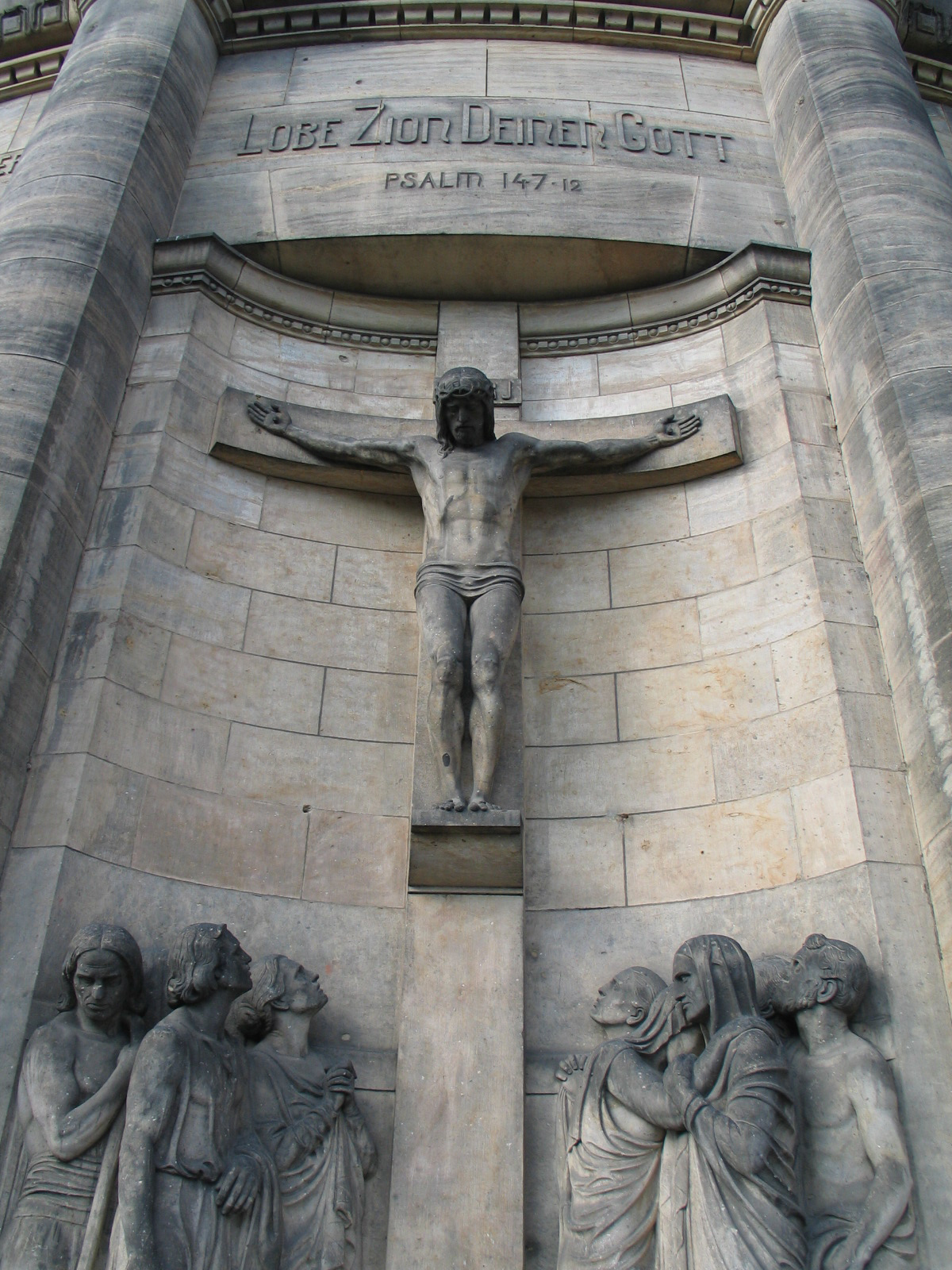
Detail of the Alten Zionskirche: "Praise Thy God, O Zion" (Psalm 147.12)

The Zionskirche is the name given to two Evangelical Lutheran church buildings in the Südvorstadt district of Dresden. The first, the Alte Zionskirche, was built by Schilling & Graebner from 1908 to 1912. This building was hit and badly damaged by fire during the bombing in February 1945. A temporary roof was later added and it is now preserved as a ruin, housing a lapidarium with 3000 sculptures. The parish, meanwhile, was housed in a barracks next to the ruins until the first stone of a new building, the Neue Zionskirche, was laid on Bayreuther Straße on 5 June 1981, as a gift from the Church of Sweden. With its construction overseen by Eberhard Burger, the new building was inaugurated on 31 October 1982.
