= View of Dresden by Moonlight =

Painting by Johan Christian Dahl

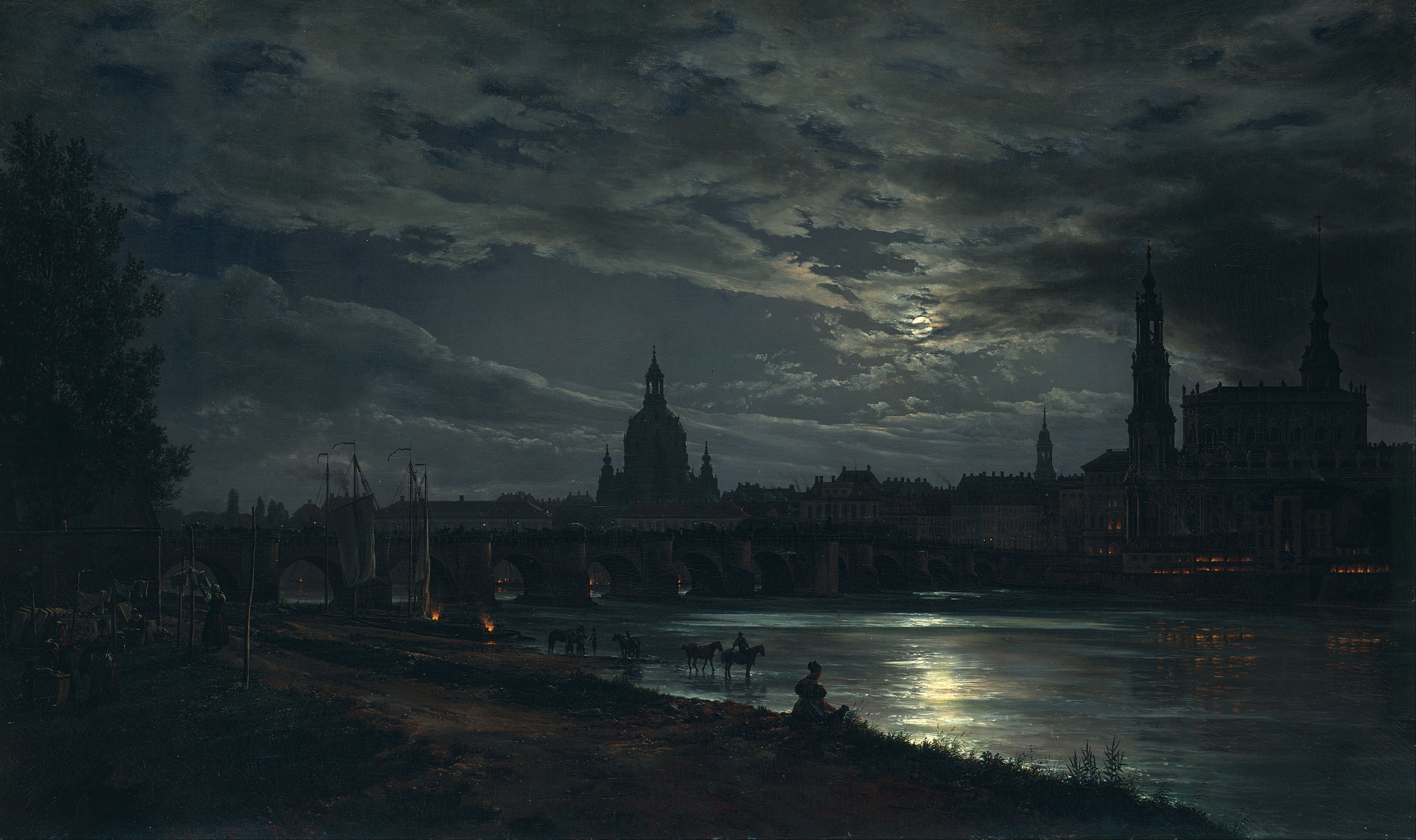
- Artist: Johan Christian Dahl
- Year: 1839
- Type: Oil on canvas, landscape painting
- Dimensions: 78 cm × 130 cm (31 in × 51 in)
- Location: Galerie Neue Meister, Dresden

View of Dresden by Moonlight (German: Blick auf Dresden bei Vollmondschein) is an 1839 landscape painting by the Norwegian artist Johan Christian Dahl. Dahl settled in the Saxon capital Dresden where, along with Caspar David Friedrich, he was known for his romantic landscapes. The night view of the city features a number of notable landmarks silhouetted by the River Elbe including the Frauenkirche, Dresden Cathedral and the Augustus Bridge.

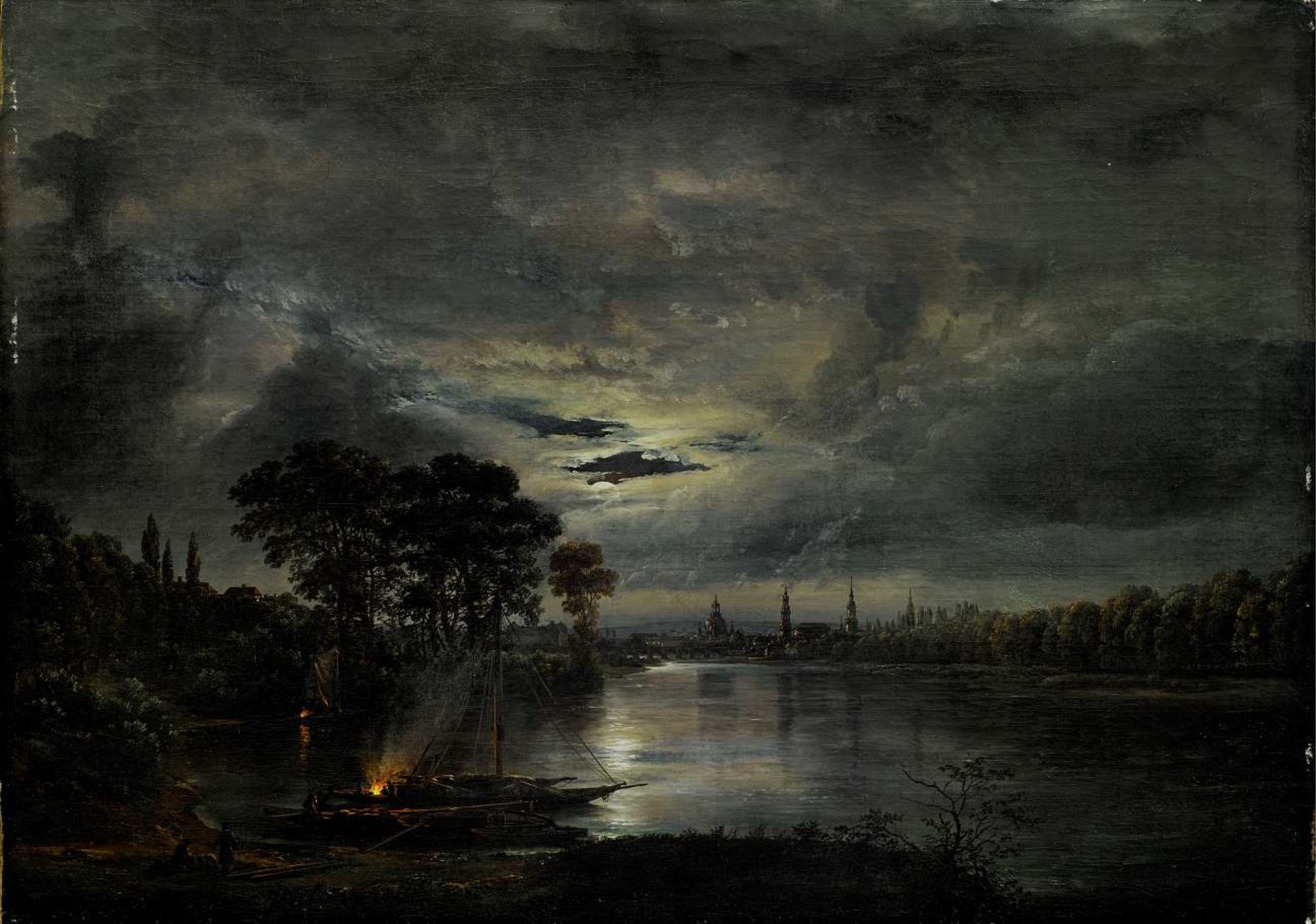
Dresden in the Moonlight, 1823. It presents a more distant view of the city.

The work is today in the collection of the Galerie Neue Meister in Dresden, having been acquired in 1937. Dahl had previously produced an 1823 work Dresden in the Moonlight, now in a private collection.

== Bibliography ==
- Bischoff, Ulrich, Hipp, Elisabeth & Nugent, Jeanne Anne. From Caspar David Friedrich to Gerhard Richter: German Paintings from Dresden. Getty Publications, 2006
- Vaughan, William. German Romantic Painting. Yale University Press, 1994.
- Wolf, Norbert. Painting of the Romantic Era. Taschen, 1999.
