= Stiftung Frauenkirche Dresden =

German foundation

Coordinates: 51.052132°N 13.742968°E

The Stiftung Frauenkirche Dresden is a legally capable foundation under civil law in Dresden established on 28 June 1994. Its purpose was initially the reconstruction of the Dresden Frauenkirche according to George Bähr's historical model. Since the completion of the work and the church consecration on the eve of Reformation Festival in 2005, the focus of the foundation's work has been on the preservation of the building and its use for church services and as a venue for holding symposia, lectures, concerts and exhibitions. The Frauenkirche is intended to serve as a landmark for tolerance and peace among peoples and religions.

The foundation is based in a commercial building at Georg-Treu-Platz 3 between the Albertinum, the Kunstakademie and the Coselpalais facing the Frauenkirche. In 2019, the foundation had 35 full-time employees. About ten times as many volunteers help shape life in the Frauenkirche.

The foundation is supported in its work by the Society for the Promotion of the Frauenkirche Dresden e. V., founded in 2003. It continues the work of the "Society for the Promotion of the Reconstruction of the Frauenkirche Dresden e. V.", which arose from a citizens' initiative in the autumn of 1989.

== History ==
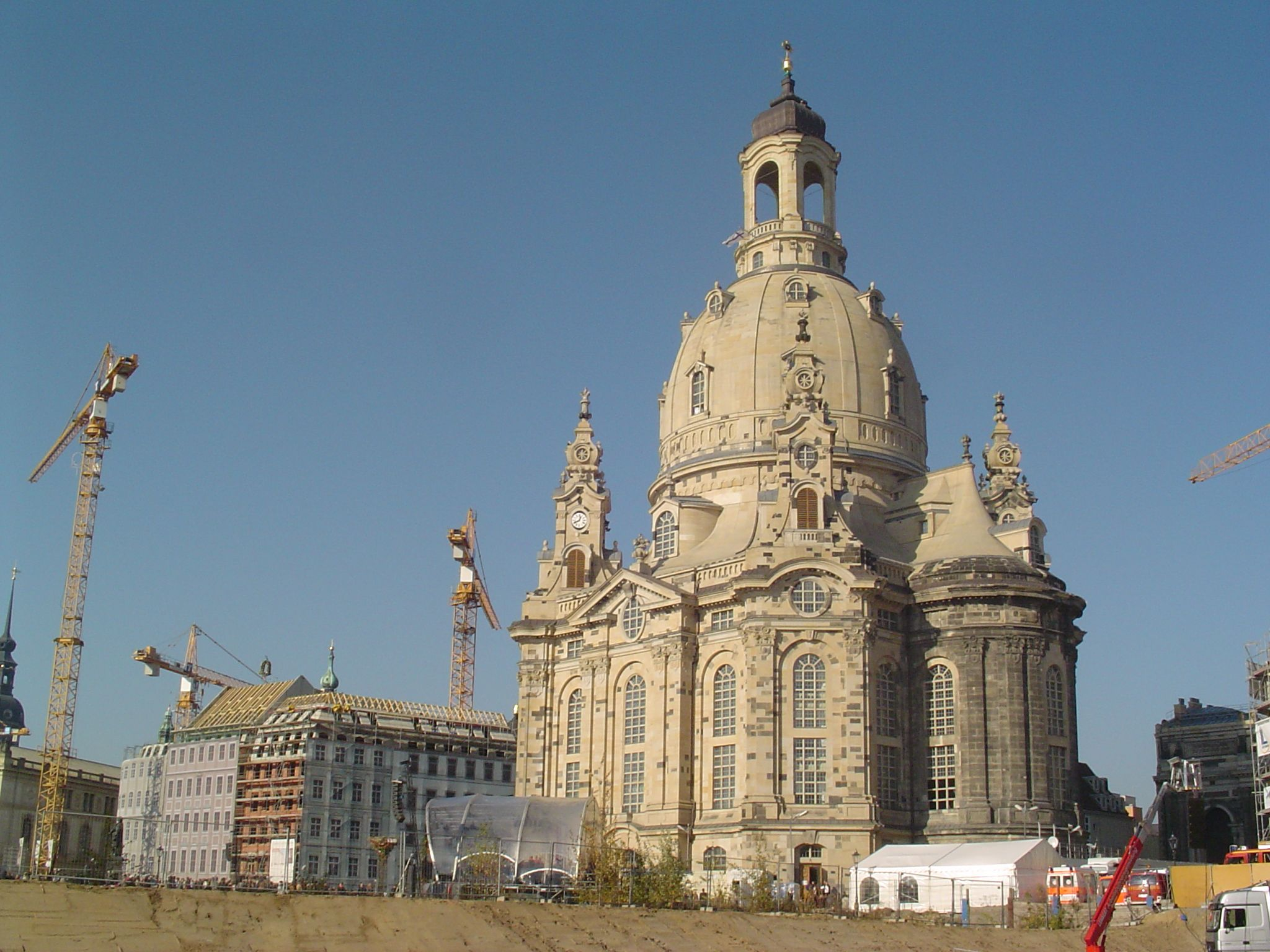
The Frauenkirche on 30 October 2005, the day it was consecrated again after reconstruction.

After the Peaceful Revolution in the GDR in autumn 1989, the opportunity arose to think realistically about the reconstruction of the Frauenkirche, which had been destroyed in the Second World War. To this end, on 12 February 1990, the day before the 45th anniversary of the beginning of the devastating air raids on Dresden, the call from Dresden went out to the world. Already at that time, it was planned to finance the reconstruction through donations, not least in order to set a Commemoration of 13 February 1945 in Dresden. In order to coordinate this task, the Landeskirche and the Fördergesellschaft established the predecessor of today's foundation under the same name as the "Stiftung Frauenkirche Dresden e. V." in November 1991 in accordance with the law on associations.

In order to meet the growing tasks, the Evangelical Lutheran Church of Saxony, the Free State of Saxony and the city of Dresden transferred the association into a foundation under civil law in June 1994. They further transferred to the foundation an endowment capital of initially six million German marks, the donations collected for the purpose of the reconstruction until then, and the 99-year leasehold estate to the property of the Frauenkirche. In the statutes, the three founders left open the possibility for the Federal Republic of Germany to join the circle of founders.

The bank manager Bernhard Walter, who came to Dresden for the Dresdner Bank in autumn 1989 and took a clear stand on the reconstruction of the Frauenkirche after being called away from Dresden, was chairman of the Foundation Council from the time the foundation was established until his death in January 2015. With the initiative of the "Aktion Stifterbrief", he contributed significantly to the financing of the reconstruction. Around 70 million euros were raised in this way, which corresponds to two-thirds of the total privately raised donations. Also associated with the Stifterbrief is one of the most famous decisions of the Federal Court of Justice on foundation law. The sole heir of a founder who died in 1998 successfully sued for the compulsory portion after her father had given the foundation around 4.7 million marks in 1995 and 1997 and another 300,000 marks in his will.

== Foundation bodies ==
In order to fulfil the foundation's purpose, the foundation is divided into three organs: Management, Foundation Council and Foundation board of trustees.

The executive board manages the foundation's assets, conducts the day-to-day business and represents the foundation in and out of court. It consists of one to three members who work full-time and are appointed by the Foundation Council. Members are appointed for a maximum of five years; reappointment is possible.

The Foundation Council is the supervisory body. It is responsible for monitoring the activities of the foundation, in particular the management. The Foundation Council may dismiss members of the management. The annual budgets to be prepared by the management shall be subject to the approval of the Foundation Council. The honorary board of trustees consists of six members who are appointed for five years and may not belong to any of the other organs of the foundation. Each founder sends one member, the other three members are sent by the board of trustees, which also appoints the chairman of the Foundation Council and its deputy.

The board of trustees represents the foundation and can decide on fundamental matters of the foundation alone. By means of a resolution, it can also decide on all matters of the foundation and thus implement the will of the founders. It consists of six members born by virtue of their office and up to nine elected members. Elected members are elected by the entire board of trustees for a term of five years. The board of trustees may not overrule the entirety of the born members. The chairman of the board of trustees shall be the Landesbischof of the Evangelical-Lutheran Church of Saxony (EvLKS).

== Staffing ==
=== Members of the board of trustees ===
Born members of the board of trustees are (as of 2022):

- Tobias Bilz (regional bishop of the EvLKS, also chairman)
- Hans-Peter Vollbach (president of the Evangelical Lutheran Regional Church Office of Saxony)
- Olaf Scholz (Chancellor of the Federal Republic of Germany)
- Michael Kretschmer (Prime Minister of the Free State of Saxony)
- Christian Behr (superintendent of the Dresden Mitte church district of the EvLKS)
- Dirk Hilbert (Lord Mayor of the State Capital Dresden)

Chosen members (as of 2022):

- Thomas Bellut (director of Zweites Deutsches Fernsehen)
- Christopher Cocksworth (Bishop of Coventry; see Coventry Cross of Nails)
- Helmut Schleweis (president of the Deutscher Sparkassen- und Giroverband)
- Klaus Rosenfeld (Chief Executive Officer of the Schaeffler AG)
- Dirk Syndram (deputy director general of the Landtag of the Free State of Saxony)

=== Members of the Foundation Council ===
Members of the Foundation Council are (as of 2021):

- Joachim Hoof, chairman of the foundation board (chairman of the Ostsächsische Sparkasse Dresden)
- Matthias Rößler, vice-chairman of the foundation board (president of the Landtag of the Free State of Saxony)
- Annekatrin Klepsch (Assistant City Councillor for Culture and Tourism of the State Capital Dresden)
- Klaus Schurig (Oberlandeskirchenrat)
- Martina de Maizière (board member of the Foundation Art and Music for Dresden as well as founding member and board member of the Förderverein Kulturhauptstadt Dresden 2025 e.V.)
- RA Otto Stolberg-Stolberg (chairman of the Society for the Promotion of the Frauenkirche Dresden)

=== Management ===
Since May 2020, Maria Noth, who has worked for the foundation since 2018, has been its managing director. Another executive director since May 2021 is Markus Engelhardt, one of the two pastors of the church.
