= George Bähr =

German architect

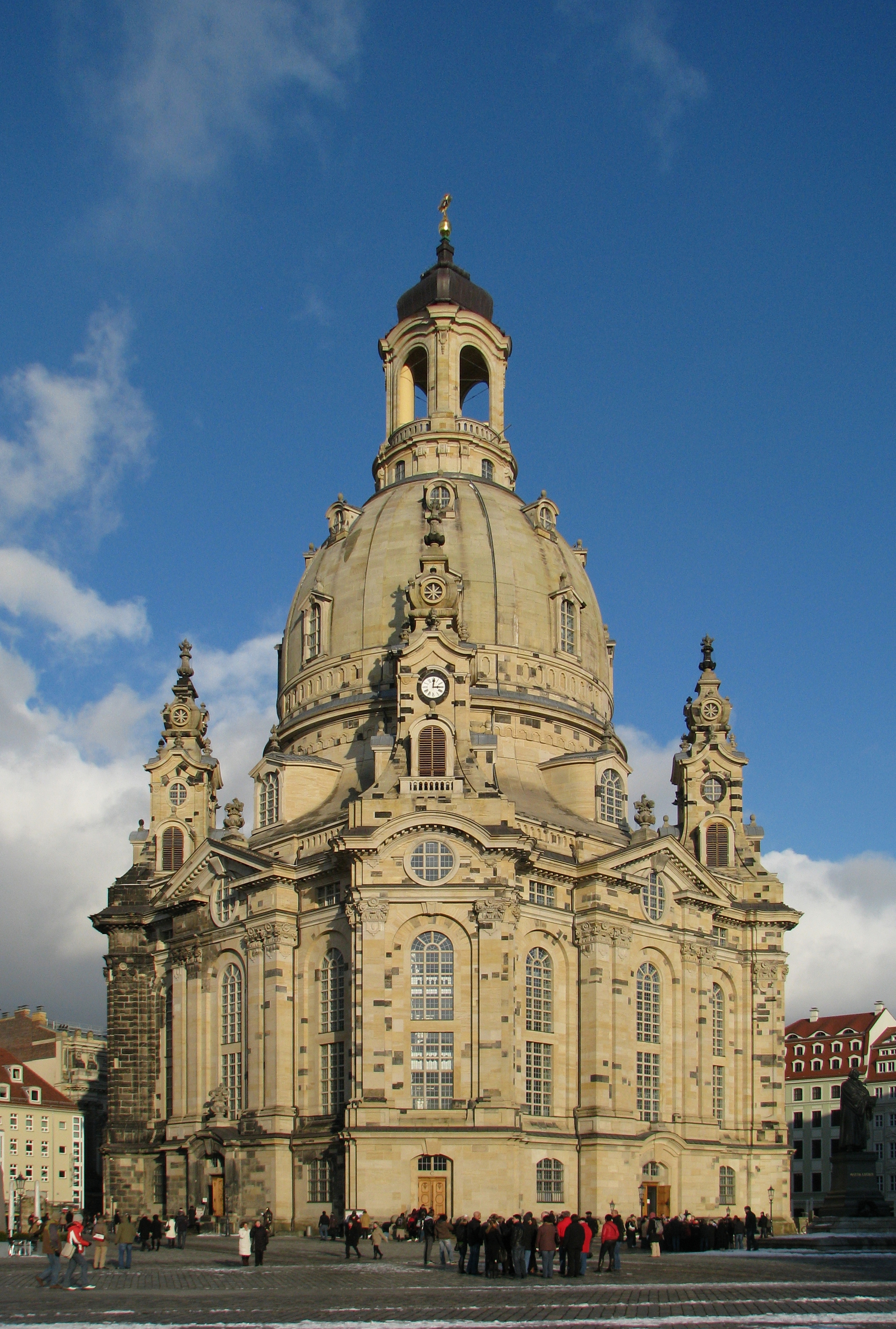
Frauenkirche, Dresden

George Bähr (15 March 1666 – 16 March 1738) was a German architect.

== Life ==
George Bähr was born into a poor family in Fürstenwalde (now a part of Geising, Saxony), the son of a weaver. The village priest, however, helped pay for his education, and Bähr was able to become a carpenter's apprentice in Lauenstein, Saxony.

In 1690, Bähr went to Dresden to start work as a carpenter. His dream was to go to Italy and see the famous buildings there, so in his spare time he studied mechanics, calling himself both an artist and a mechanic, and designing not only castles and palaces but also sketches of organs.

In 1705, aged 39, Bahr was named Dresden's City Master Carpenter, although he did not even have a master carpenter's certificate. One of Bähr's main goals was to modernise the city's churches. He believed that the existing buildings did no justice to Protestant church services in particular.

His first building was the Loschwitz Church, a building in the shape of a stretched-out octagon, completed in 1708.

The Dresden Waisenhauskirche (Orphanage Church) was built around 1710, followed by the Dreifaltigkeitskirche (Trinity Church) in Schmiedeberg, in the Ore Mountains, 1713–1716. Between 1719 and 1726 the church in Forchheim was built, as well as more in Königstein, Hohnstein and Kesselsdorf (all in Saxony) and a considerable amount of housing in Dresden.

But Bähr is most famous for designing the Frauenkirche in Dresden. He was given the task in 1722; in 1726, the design was approved and work began. From 1730, Bähr became the first in Germany to go by the title of “Architect”.

Whilst working on the Frauenkirche, Bähr also oversaw the building of the Dreikönigskirche in Dresden's Neustadt area, designed by Matthäus Daniel Pöppelmann.

George Bähr did not live to see the Frauenkirche completed – he died in Dresden, aged 72, and was buried in the church's vaults. In 2004, a memorial was built to him in the castle at Lauenstein, where he learned his trade.

== DNA Analysis ==
In 2018, researchers from the University of Tuebingen and the Max Planck Institute for the Science of Human History in Jena analyzed the genome of George Bähr. They found that he most likely had light skin pigmentation, brown eyes and is of central European origin.

== Gallery ==
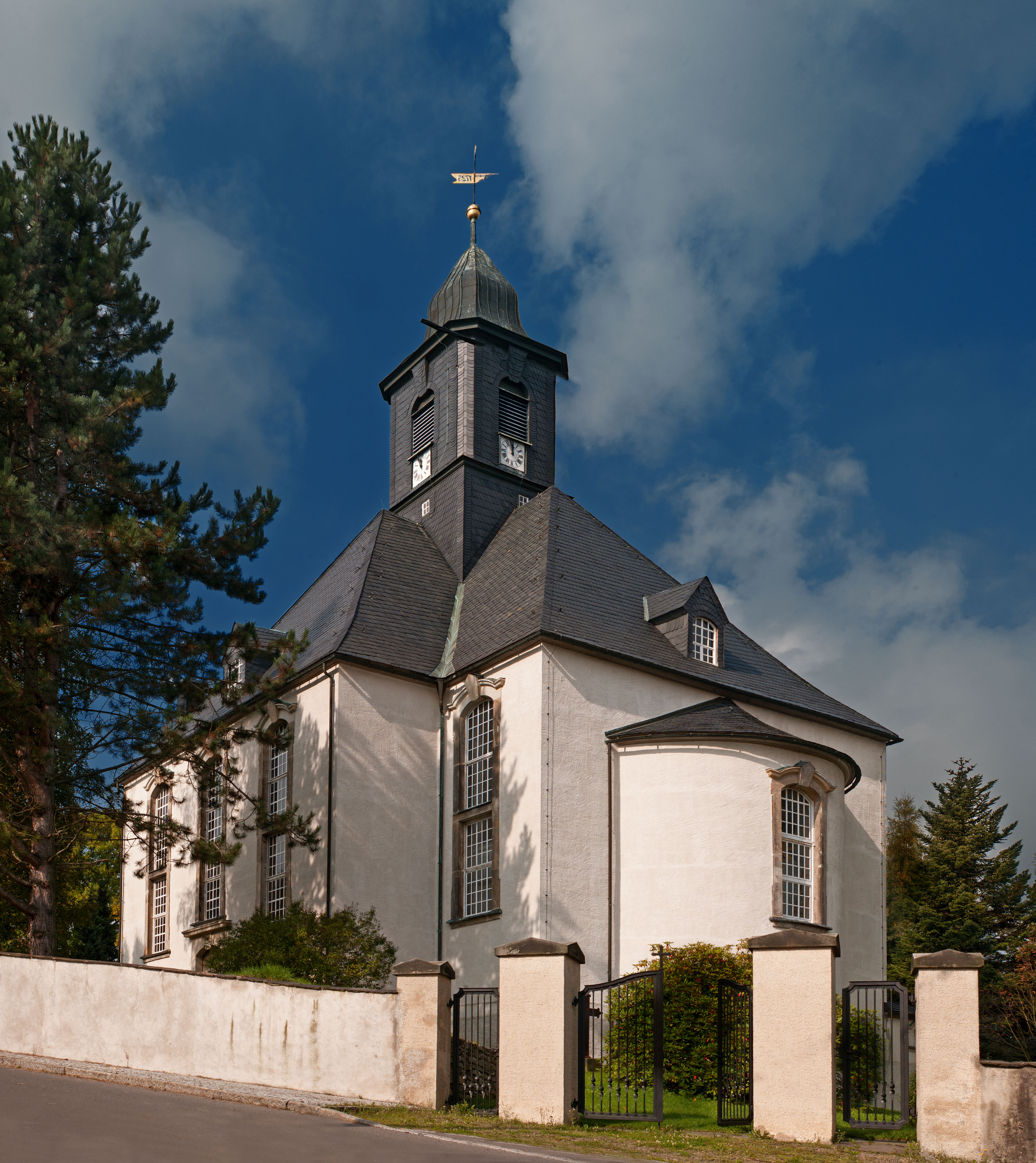
Village Church in Forchheim

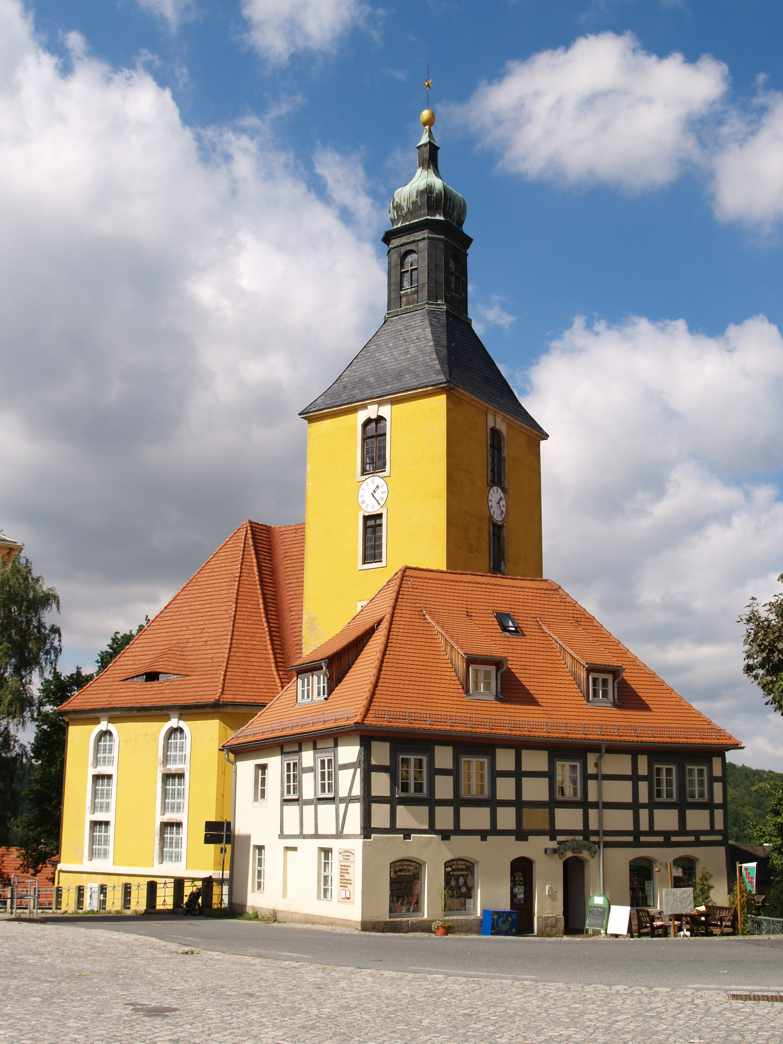
Stadtkirche in Hohnstein

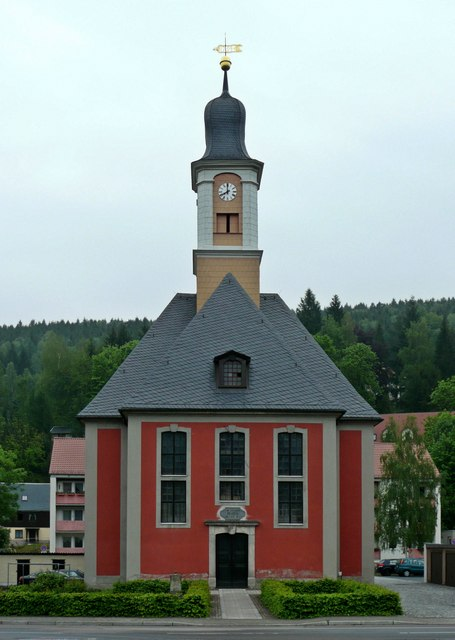
Dreifaltigkeitskirche in Schmiedeberg

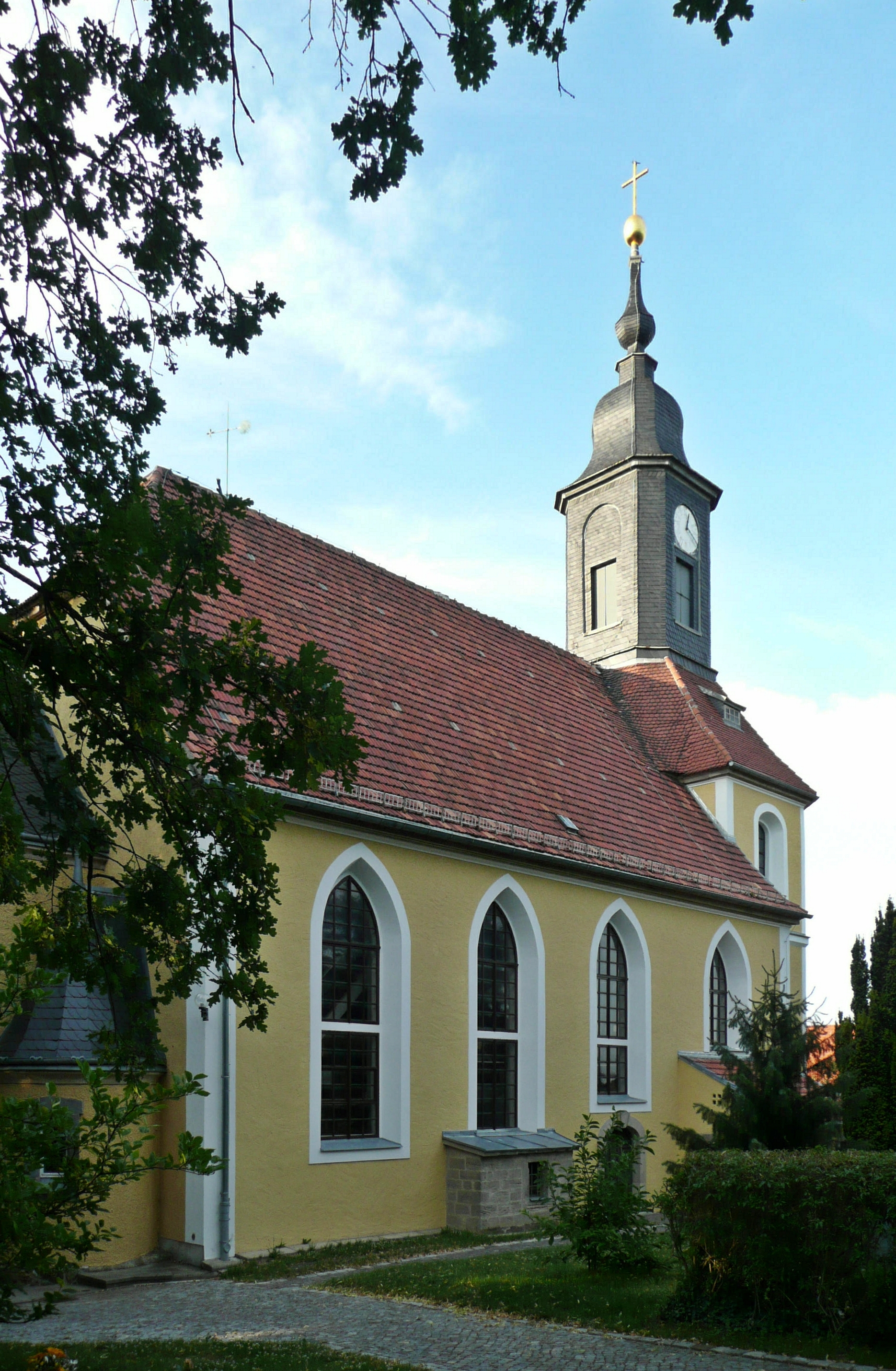
Church in Kesselsdorf

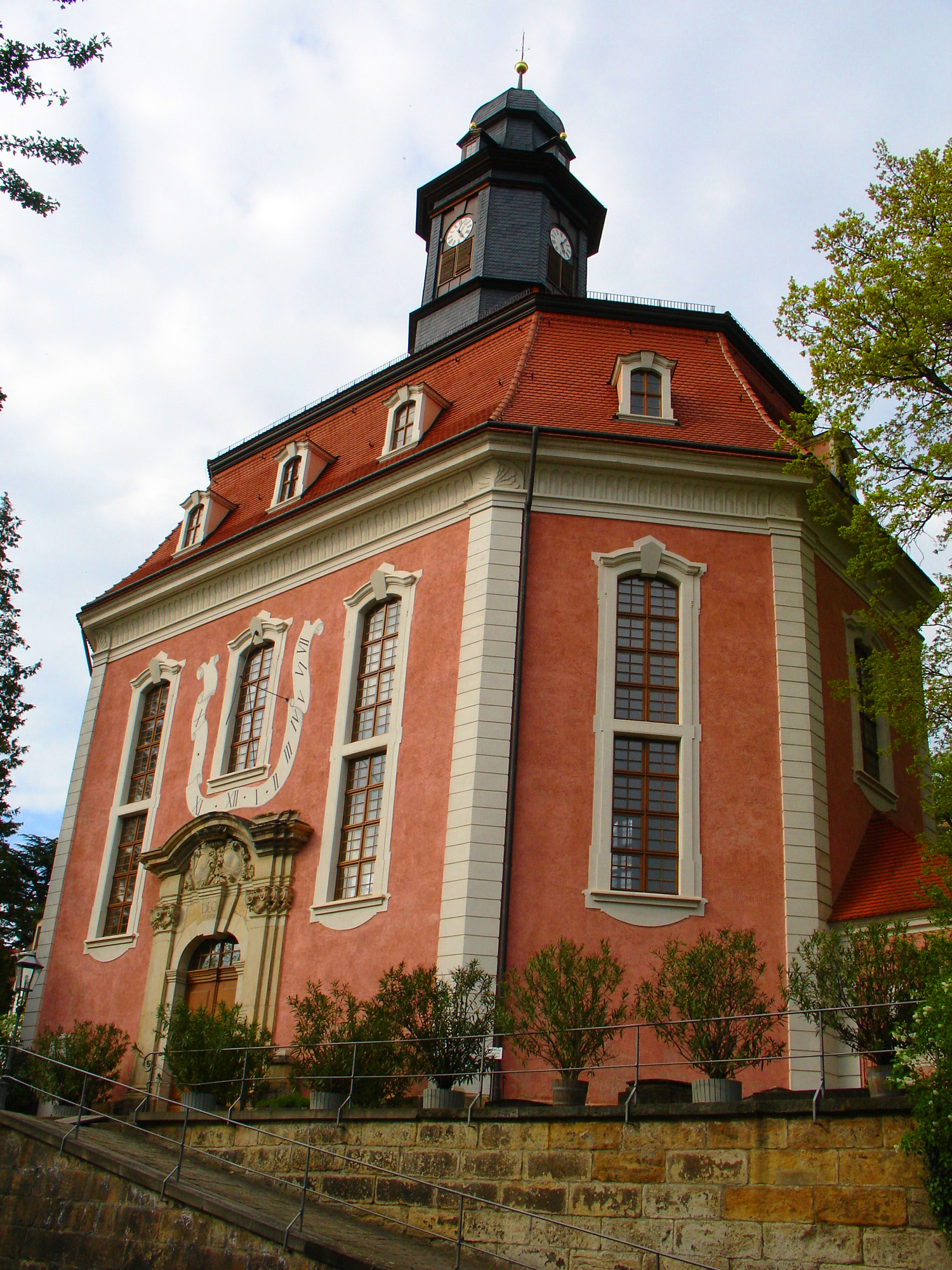
Church in Loschwitz
