= Frauenkirchhof (Dresden) =

Oldest known cemetery in Dresden

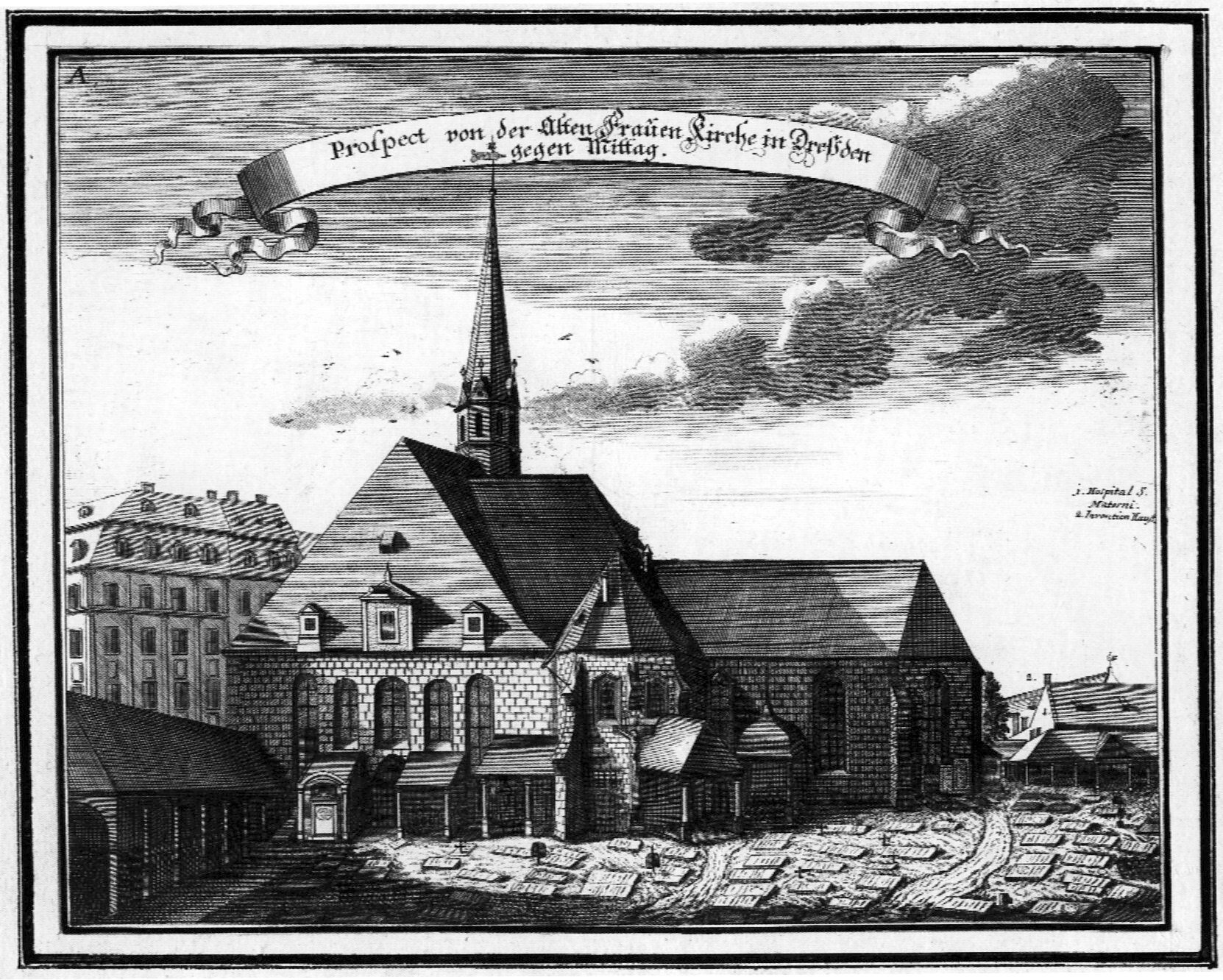
- The old Frauenkirche with its churchyard; candle arches can be seen in the foreground on the left
- Interactive map of Frauenkirchhof

Details
- Location: Dresden
- Country: Germany
- Coordinates: 51°3′6.82″N 13°44′30.02″E

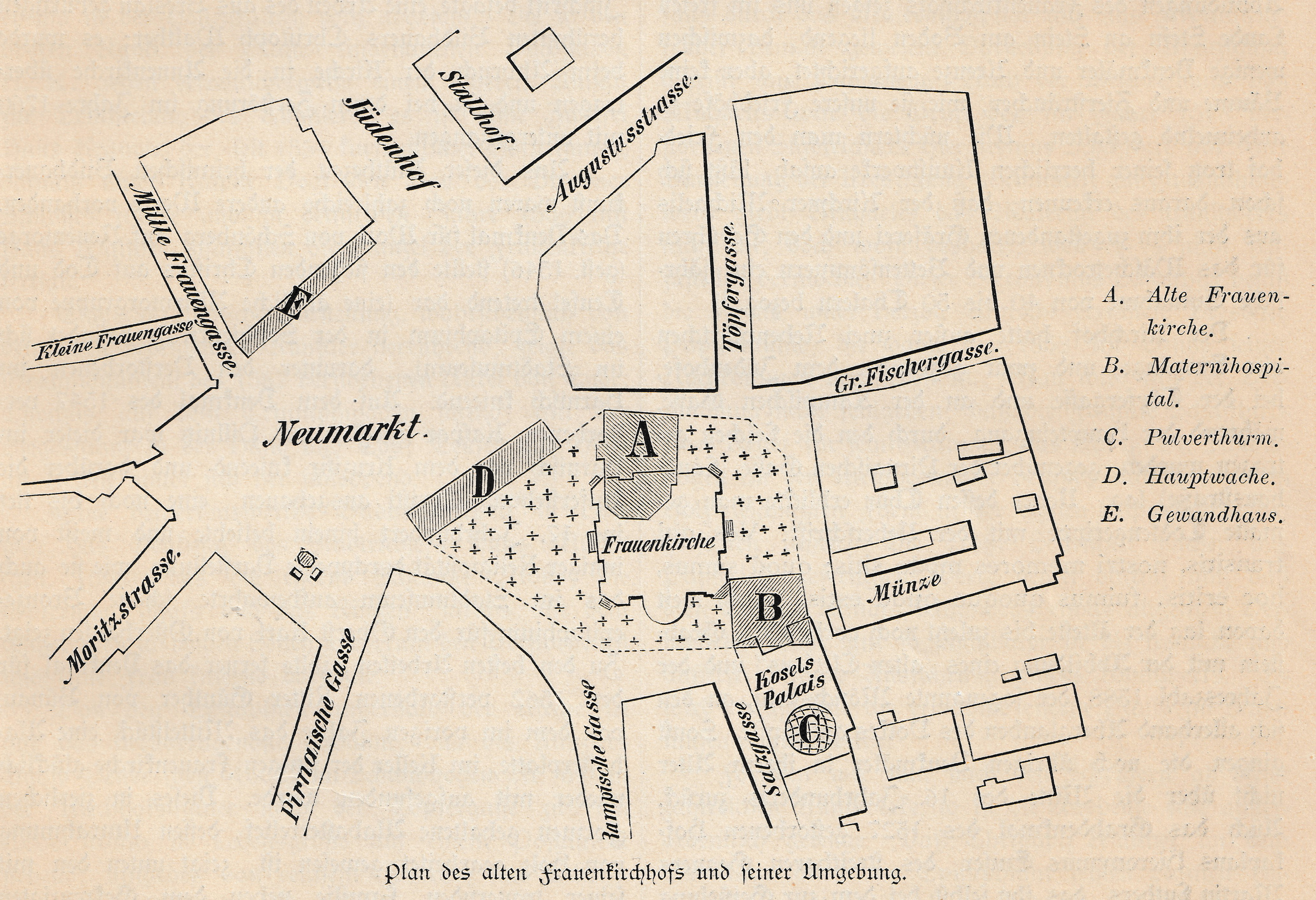
Site plan sketch by Otto Richter (archivist), 1894

The Frauenkirchhof was the oldest known cemetery in Dresden. It had existed since the first building of the Frauenkirche, which is dated to the 10th or 11th century. Until the 16th century, the Frauenkirchhof was the main burial place for the inhabitants of Dresden, who often buried their dead in the cemetery for several generations due to large family graves. The richly decorated and painted Schwibbogengräber were of particular art-historical value. Due to new buildings at the Frauenkirche, the cemetery was initially reduced in size several times and finally secularized by 1727 despite protests from the population in the course of the construction of the new Frauenkirche built by George Bähr. Epitaphs and gravestones have been preserved from the cemetery. Archaeological excavations since the 1980s have unearthed grave goods, including several funeral crowns.

== History ==
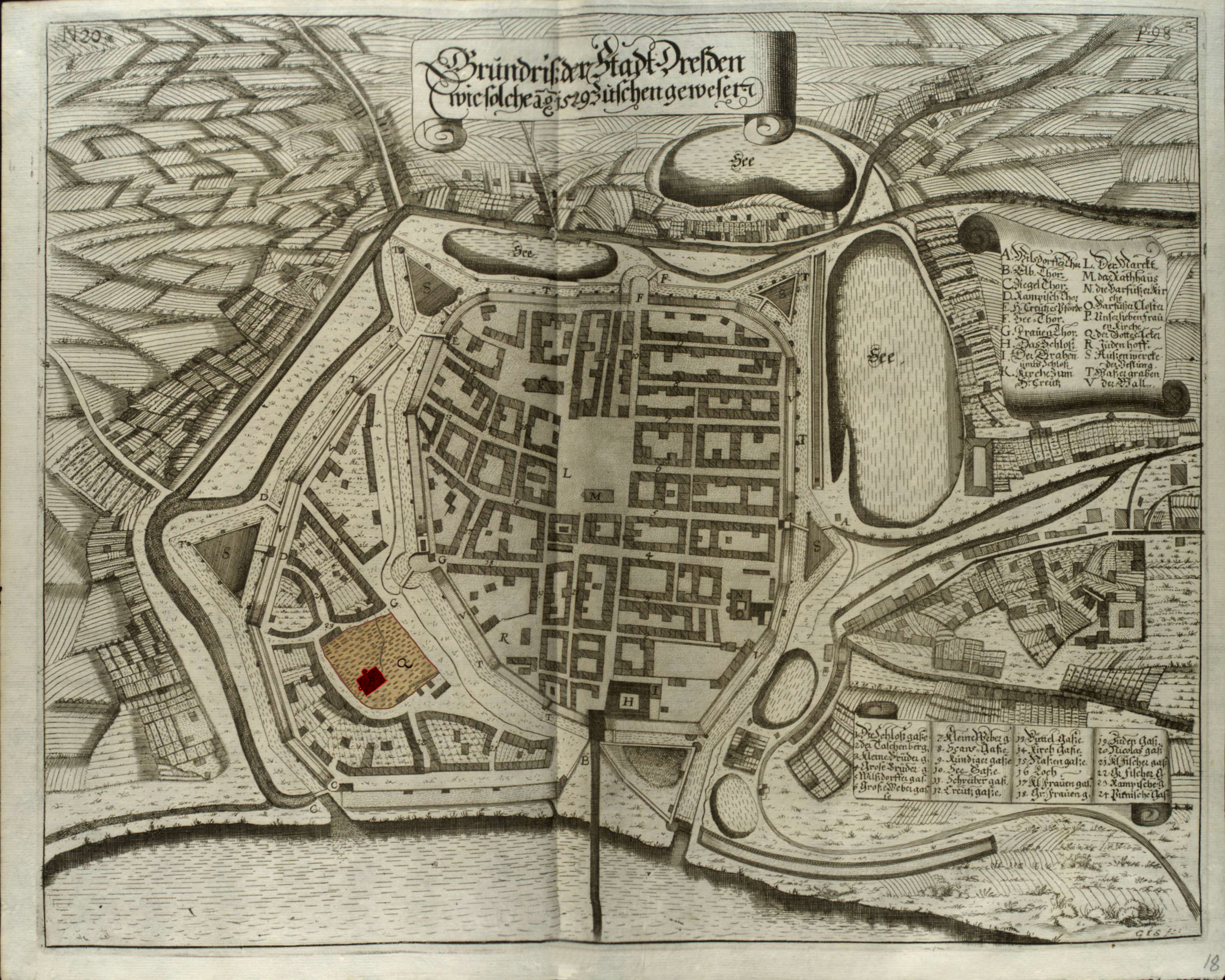
Church and churchyard (colored in) around 1529, softened map (with the old Elbe bridge at the bottom)

=== Until the beginning of the 18th century ===
Since the construction of the first Frauenkirche, which research places at the end of the 10th or the beginning of the 11th century,. The churchyard was used as a burial ground. Excavations carried out in 1987 on the former Frauenkirchhof uncovered grave remains probably from the 11th or early 12th century.

In the late Middle Ages, the Frauenkirche increasingly lost its importance as a city church to the Kreuzkirche, but enjoyed the highest reputation as a burial place; no cemetery could be built around the Kreuzkirche for reasons of space and burials inside the Kreuzkirche were also forbidden, as the church was to be kept "pure" as a place of assembly. Otherwise, in the late Middle Ages, only monasteries and hospitals were allowed to bury their dead in their own churchyard - apart from the Frauenkirchhof, only the Cemetery of the Bartholomäushospital existed at this time. Other permanent cemeteries, such as the Annen- and the Johanniskirchhof, were only established in the second half of the 16th century. While funeral services in Dresden were held in the Kreuzkirche, the funeral procession always followed through the city to the Frauenkirche, where the short burial ceremony took place. After the Reformation in 1539, the Frauenkirche and its churchyard were used exclusively for funerals for 20 years.

The Frauenkirchhof was enclosed by buildings on all sides from the middle of the 16th century. It was first reduced in size by the development of the area between Augustusstraße, Töpfergasse, An der Frauenkirche and Neumarkt. The church was no longer surrounded by the churchyard, but was located directly next to a row of houses to the west. The churchyard was also reduced in size towards Neumarkt. The churchyard was given a wall in 1561. The churchyard could now be entered via four entrances: From Pirnaische Gasse at Neumarkt, from where the bodies were also brought to the churchyard, from Jüdenhof, from Töpfergasse and from Rampische Gasse. Two side gates connected the Maternihospital and the Kirchnerwohnung with the cemetery.

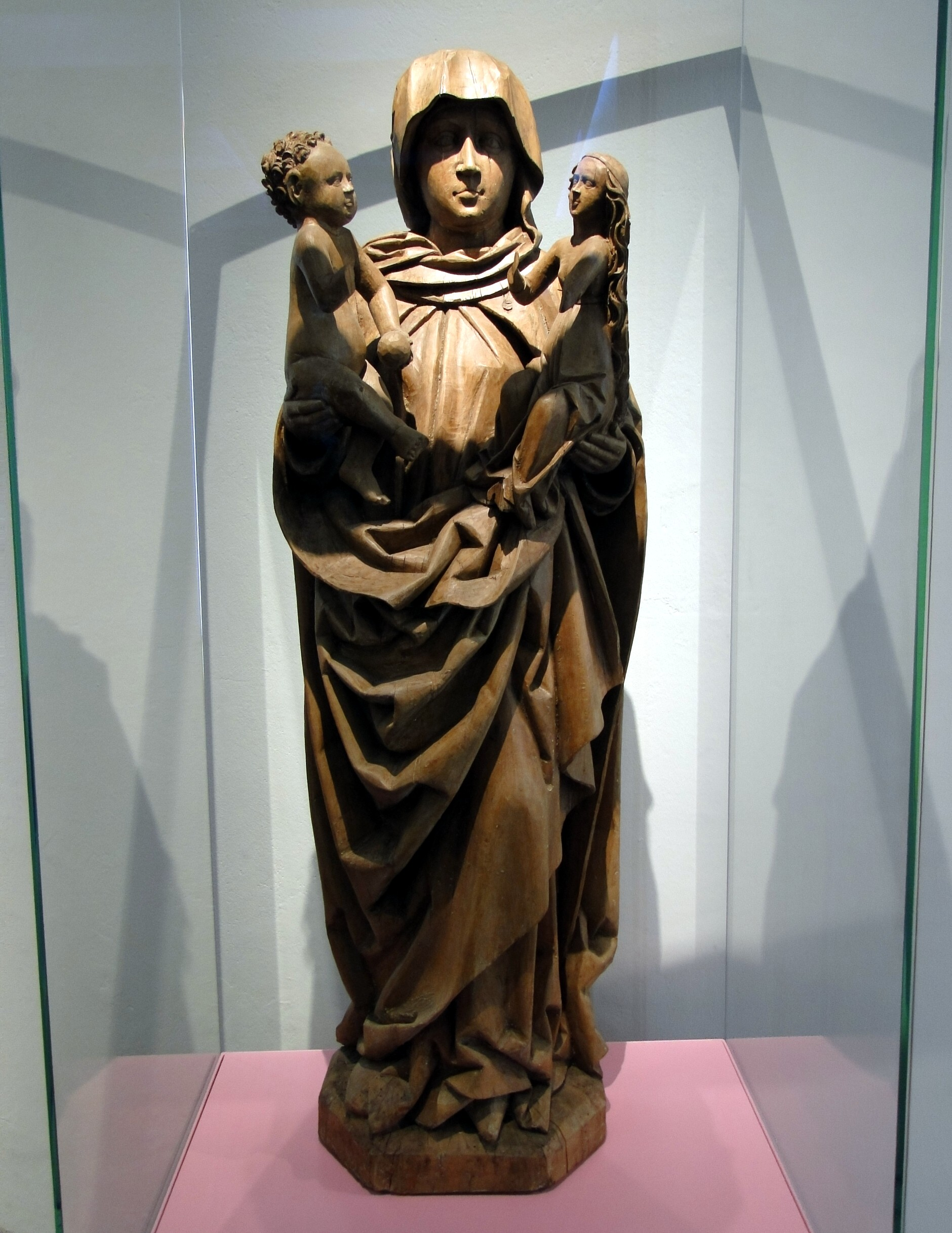
St. Anne the Third, presumably from the Annen altar of the ossuary

The Frauenkirchhof could no longer be extended due to the wall enclosure and the extensive development. The graves were therefore reburied at relatively short intervals. However, the excavated bones were not destroyed but kept in a deep vault in the so-called ossuary in the churchyard. The predecessor building of the ossuary was possibly a small chapel in the churchyard, which was consecrated in 1373, 1375 and 1388 and was dedicated to the Trinity and Saint Anne. It was probably demolished and replaced by the ossuary completed in 1514. On April 24, 1514, the ossuary was consecrated by Bishop Johannes von Meißen. The stonemasons and masons donated an altar of St. Anne, the four crowned martyrs and the Holy Chair of Peter to the ossuary in the Frauenkirchhof in 1514. In 1558, the ossuary was demolished above ground, but the underground vaults were preserved. In 1714, they were still "completely filled with bones and preserved with an iron door". Above ground, a memorial stone was placed between two Linden trees around 1714. A wooden statue of St. Anne has probably survived from the altar of the ossuary. She is depicted as Anna selbdritt, an elderly woman holding Mary and Jesus in her arms. The origin of the statue, which is made of lime wood and is 131 centimetres high, is estimated to date back to 1510. The back of the sculpture is hollowed out; the statue used to be painted. It can be found in the Skulpturensammlung of the Staatliche Kunstsammlungen Dresden.

Initially, only clergymen were buried in the Frauenkirche itself. Later, nobles and court officials were also able to purchase a grave in the church for a high fee. The Frauenkirche was a popular burial site, so that the number of potential graves in the church far exceeded the number of interested parties. From 1561 to 1562, master mason Voitt Grohe therefore erected vaulted arches on the church wall and later on the entire cemetery wall. Stonemasons and bricklayers were also at work; Lewin Lehmann covered the arches from 1564 to 1565. 112 exclusive hereditary burial sites were thus created, which citizens and noblemen could acquire on the cemetery wall and next to the church. Four guilders had to be paid for a chapel-like vault with a deep crypt, which was around 11.5 square meters in size. Around 30 people could be buried in a vault.

Khe church and churchyard could no longer hold all of Dresden's dead by 1572. Elector August therefore ordered that from then on, 15 thalers had to be paid for burials in the church; burials in the churchyard cost three thalers, child burials half that amount. However, free burials could take place in St. John's churchyard, which had been consecrated in 1571. In the following years, the burial costs increased more and more as the lack of space grew. In 1671, the fee for a grave in the churchyard had doubled to six thalers. At the Elector's behest, large gravestones were banned in 1679, with the exception of graves of "respectable persons". The fees were further increased and the number of people allowed to be buried in the cemetery was further restricted: Court servants, burghers and servants, even if they could afford the fees for a grave in the cemetery, had to be buried in St. John's Churchyard. In 1895, Otto Richter stated: "All in all, the Frauenkirche and its surroundings formed a veritable museum of time-honored works of art and historical memories. On the other hand, given the dilapidation of the building itself and the neglected condition of some of the burial grounds, its overall appearance may by no means have been magnificent."

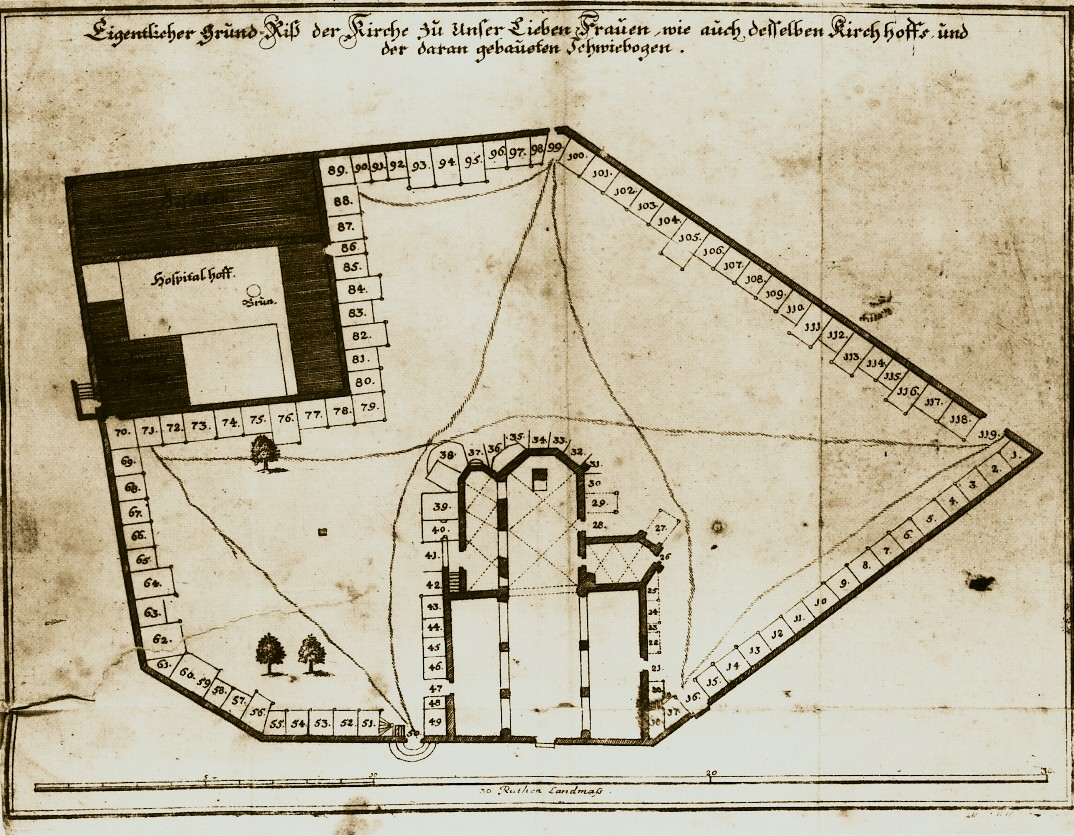
Geospatial ground plan of the Frauenkirche and the churchyard with marked arches; engraving by Moritz Bodenehr, 1714

=== Reduction and demolition from 1714 to 1727 ===
In January 1714, the Dresden City Council first became aware of plans to demolish the cemetery. The plan was to build a newer, much larger main guardhouse to replace the old Corps de Garde (main guardhouse). This meant that not only the water houses and fish stalls that stood on the outer wall of the churchyard had to be removed, but also some vaults and graves of town clergymen. In the same year, Elector Friedrich August I extended his demolition plans to the entire cemetery, forbidding further burials in the Frauenkirchhof on November 21, 1714 and giving instructions to rebury bodies that were still unburied. Although the dissolution of the entire cemetery was not implemented, the demolition of individual gravesites for the Hauptwacheneubau began in 1715, despite complaints from the Oberkonsistorium under the leadership of Superintendent Valentin Ernst Löscher. It was built from 1715 under the direction of Johann Rudolph Fäsch. Field Marshal Jacob Heinrich von Flemming wrote to the city council asking them to prevent the demolition of the graves:

Once it is in the rule that in residences and fortresses churchyards are not well suited, and where such exist, they are gradually abolished [...] the present undertaking [...] has no other final purpose than merely to introduce what is customary in other residences and fortresses, whereby at the same time the city is put out of danger from worrying infections, which can easily arise through the opportunity of churchyards.

— Jacob Heinrich von Flemming, Warschau den 10. Juli 1715.,

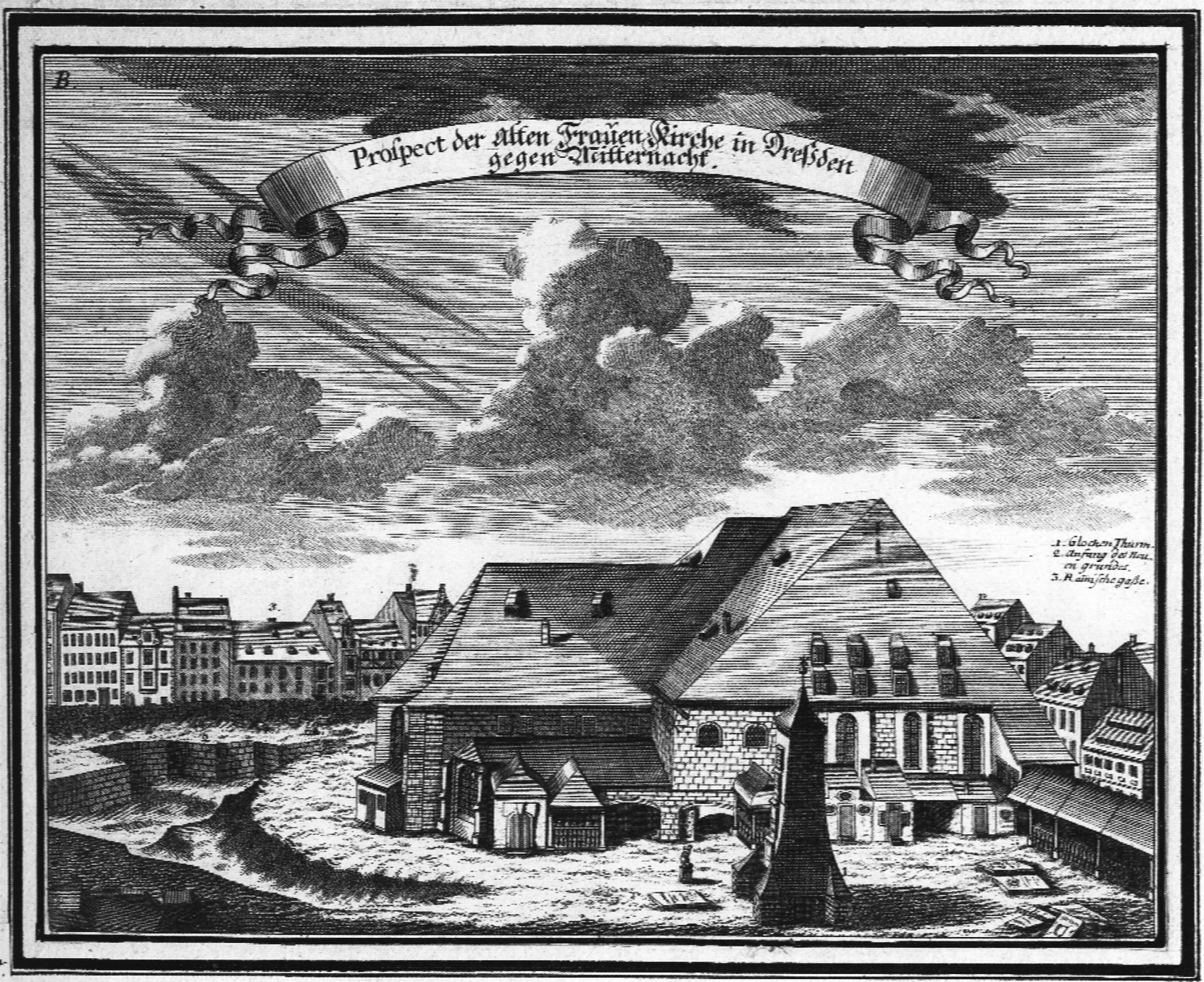
The Frauenkirchhof during the dissolution around 1727

The cemetery wall and arches were first removed from the side of the Materni Hospital so that the ground work for the new Frauenkirche could begin there, as decided by the Dresden City Council at its meeting on June 27, 1726. In the period that followed, until 1727, henchmen repeatedly dug up corpses and reburied them. Grave goods such as gold and silver rings and chains were delivered in exchange for tips. There were still many epitaphs on the outer wall of the church at the time, so that the transport invoices from February 1727 record "30 loads of epitaphs from the church in front of the Wilsdruffer Thor". The demolition work on the old Frauenkirche and the churchyard continued until the end of April 1727. Only the west wall of the church and the immediately adjacent churchyard wall remained at the end of April, probably initially to protect the building site. They were finally removed in August, so that the demolition of the old Frauenkirche and the secularization of the churchyard were completed in August 1727.

=== Archaeological investigations in the present ===
The site of the old Frauenkirchhof was archaeologically investigated for the first time in the 1980s. The reason for this was the new construction of the Hotel Dresdner Hof (later Hilton Dresden) on the corner of Töpferstraße/Münzgasse, during which trenches were dug for pipes and cables and the former churchyard wall was also cut into. The next investigations extended to the west side of the former Frauenkirchhof at the edge of the then rubble hill of the Bährschen Frauenkirche and took place in 1987. The section was 40 meters long. The explorations revealed closely spaced tombs and graves both inside the church walls and outside in the churchyard, even though the section of the churchyard investigated was very small and the main focus of the excavation was on the old church building.

A second archaeological dig took place from October 1994 to August 1995 during the reconstruction of the Dresden Frauenkirche. This involved the construction of underground checkrooms and other rooms outside the church building, which meant that areas of the former Frauenkirche courtyard that had not previously been archaeologically investigated had to be destroyed. During the rescue excavation on the north-east, east and small parts of the south-east side of the Bährsche Frauenkirche Around 300 grave sites were documented, which mainly involved tombs on the old cemetery wall. During the excavation, burial sites of different occupancy layers were documented. Among the finds was the Kegeler family tomb from the early 17th century with a gravestone and the skeletons of the two people buried in front of it. Fragmentary clothing remains were found in the graves. Various pieces of jewelry were also recovered.

Long-term archaeological investigations also took place in the area of the former Frauenkirchhof cemetery due to the redevelopment of the Dresdner Neumarkt from the mid-1990s to the mid-2000s. During various excavations in the (south) west of the churchyard, around 700 burials were documented, with the majority of the graves destroyed. The destruction was caused by the reburial of graves up to the 18th century, but also by new buildings or the laying of pipes after the cemetery was secularized. Grave sites were uncovered layer by layer during the investigations, whereby individual grave pits could only be identified during the deepest excavations. The skeletons found were mostly of older children and adolescents, who were usually buried in a supine position with their arms crossed in front of their chest. Compressed shoulders in some finds indicate that the pits were very narrow at the time of burial. Wooden crosses were recovered as grave goods in clayey soil layers. Eight simple wooden coffins were also uncovered. "In total, less than a tenth of the interred are likely to have been buried in coffins," concluded the archaeological excavation. In contrast to the burial area investigated in 1994, which was located to the east of later excavations, baroque grave goods such as funeral wreaths were missing in the investigated area. It is therefore probably a section of the cemetery that was no longer used for burials in the 18th century.

In 2005, art historian Heinrich Magirius summarized the aspects by which the Frauenkirchhof gained significance in the past and present: "While [Johann Gottfried] Michaelis was interested in the [...] still legible inscriptions on monuments, the art historians of the 20th century were primarily interested in the artistically valuable funerary monuments. Century art historians were primarily interested in the artistically valuable funerary monuments, while contemporary archaeologists are mainly interested in the burial forms and rites."

== Preserved gravestones and epitaphs ==
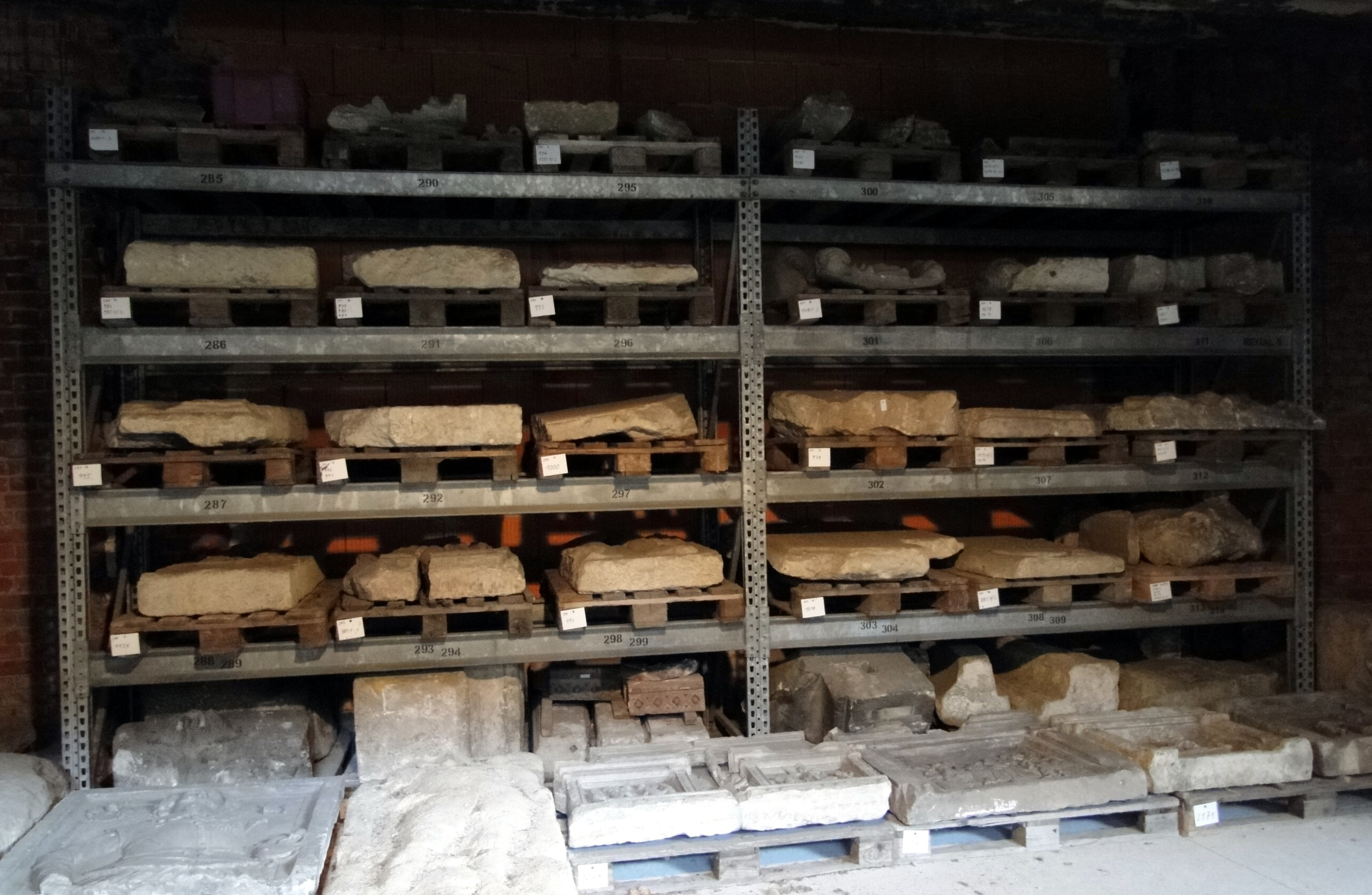
Stored gravestones in the Zion Church lapidarium

When the cemetery was secularized and the Frauenkirche was demolished, some of the gravestones and epitaphs were salvaged by the families of the deceased. However, the high cost of transferring and re-installing them in another cemetery meant that many of the cemetery's works of art were lost. Over 90 grave slabs and epitaphs from the Frauenkirche cemetery have been preserved, whereby the preservation is often due to "fortunate circumstances". During the secularization of the churchyard, fragments of epitaphs that were considered "unusable" were taken to the city's poorhouse and stored there. Johann Georg Ehrlich requested "the old stonework" for the reconstruction of the collegiate church of the Ehrlichschen Gestifts, which was consecrated in 1738. The central panel of Christoph von Taubenheim's epitaph served as an altar slab in the collegiate church, for example, with protruding sculptural work being cut off. By 1888, five reliefs had survived, although the Last Supper relief from the base of Christoph von Taubenheim's epitaph, which was located in the gallery of the collegiate church, was hit and damaged by a cannonball during the Battle of Dresden on August 26, 1813.

When the church was demolished around 1900, the fragments came to the Jakobikirche and were stored in the cellars of the Kreuzkirche in Dresden when it was demolished in 1947. In addition to the part of Christoph von Taubenheim's epitaph, the surviving fragments include, for example, an attachment to Caspar von Ziegler's epitaph († 1547), which, according to Walter Hentschel, was made at least ten to 15 years after the epitaph and later added to it.

Various simpler grave slabs were used as stone material in the construction of the Bährsche Frauenkirche. The first grave slabs used in this way were recovered during securing work on the Frauenkirche between 1924 and 1930. Karl Pinkert, the master builder in charge at the time, documented and photographed them. The documentation and the grave slabs were stored in the cellar of the Frauenkirche, where they were buried when the Frauenkirche collapsed as a result of the bombing of Dresden in February 1945. The stones and parts of the documentation were recovered when the church was cleared of rubble between 1994 and 1995. In addition, further gravestones and gravestone fragments were recovered during the demolition of the Frauenkirche in the 1990s. The majority of the stones, some of which were severely damaged both by their use as tombstones and by the church fire, are on display in the Lapidarium. Further gravestones found during excavations in the 1990s are located in the Landesamt für Archäologie Sachsen. More valuable epitaphs ended up in churches and museums.

=== Single gravestones ===
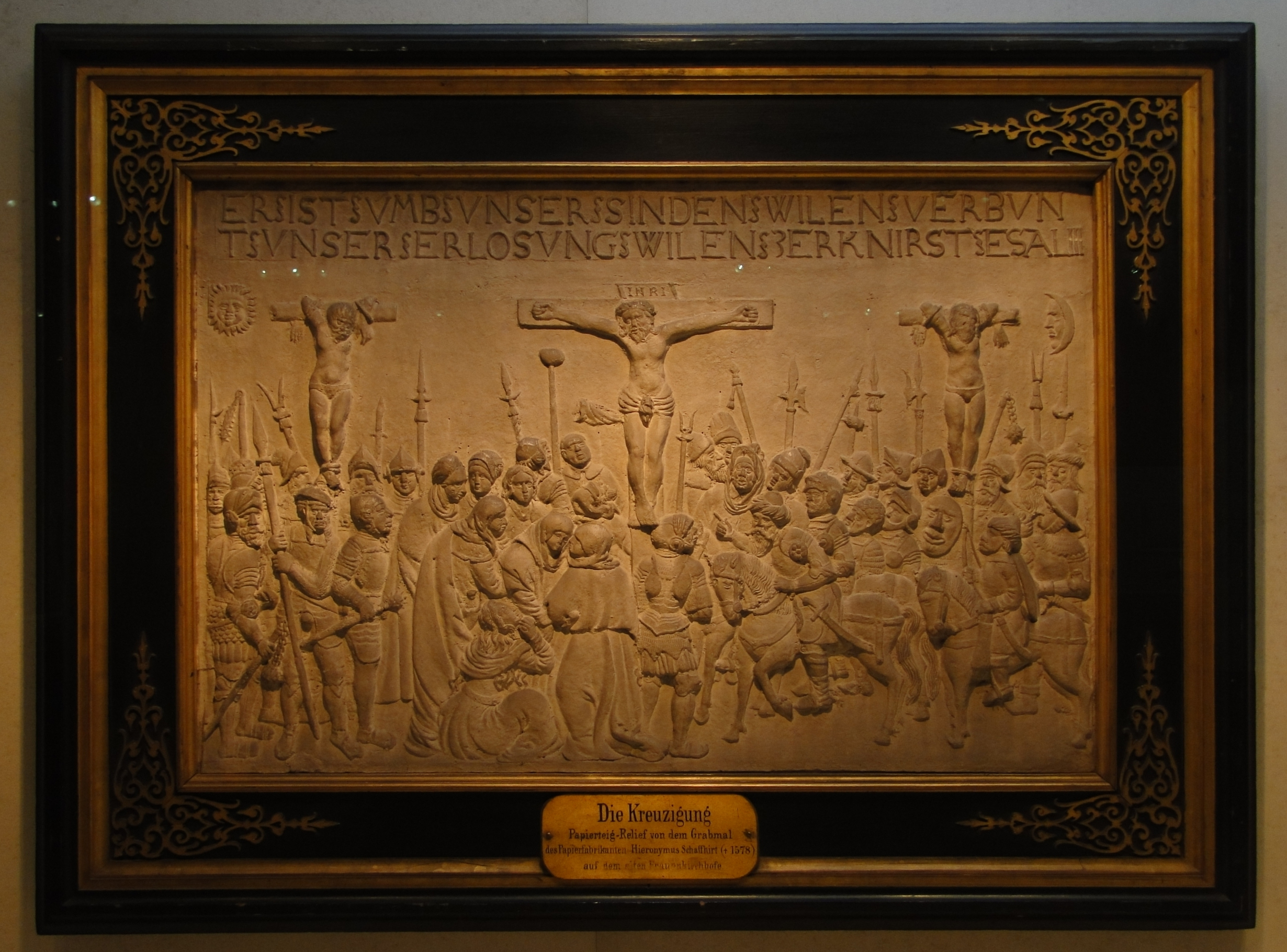
Paper dough relief from the Schaffhirt epitaph

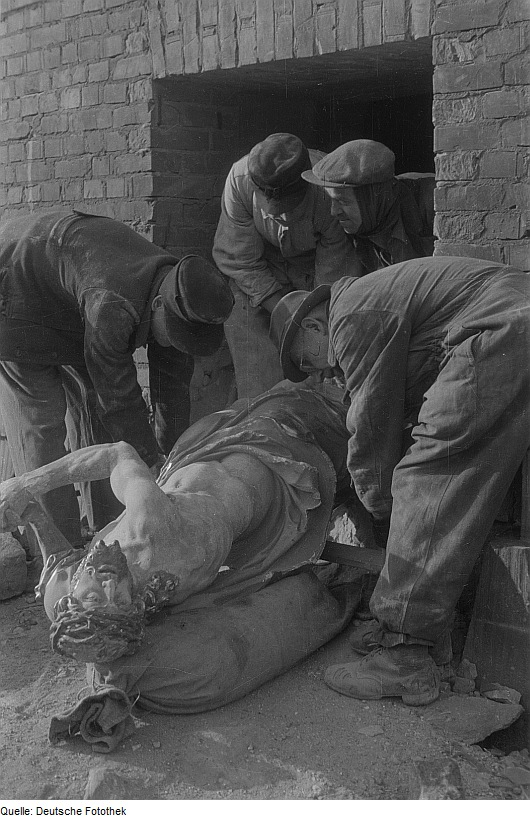
Recovery of the Ecce homo from the Schwibbogengrab of David Peifer

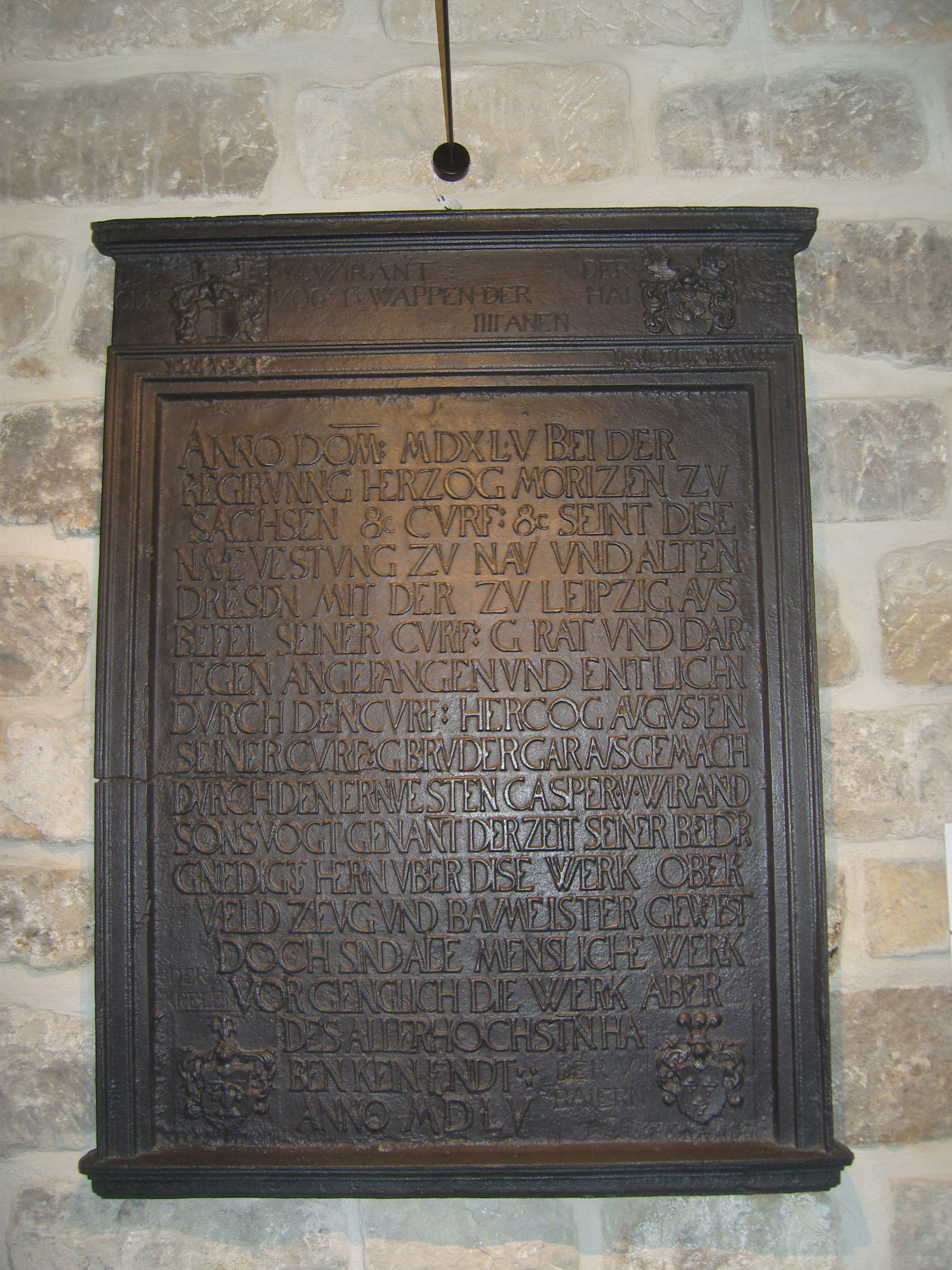
Copy of the tomb slab of Caspar Vogt from the Piatta Forma in Dresden

As the most outstanding preserved epitaph A life-size Ecce homo is said to have been there. It belonged to the grave of Chancellor David Peifer, who was buried in Schwibbogengrab number 64. The arched tomb with ceiling paintings was one of the most precious in the cemetery; the Ecce homo was originally surrounded by inscription panels and other decorations. After the cemetery was secularized, the figure was stored in the catacombs of the new Frauenkirche, where it fell into oblivion. It was rediscovered in 1893 on a walled-up cellar staircase in the Frauenkirche and, after restoration in the same year, placed not far from the altar of the Frauenkirche opposite the pulpit. Apparently the original console of the figure had also been preserved at the time. During the renovation of the interior of the Frauenkirche in 1941/42, the Ecce homo. was also given a new color scheme. During the Second World War, the figure was stored without the console in a vault under the chancel, where it survived the collapse of the church undamaged; the console was destroyed. In September 1945, the figure was salvaged and transferred to the Oskar-Seyffert-Museum in the Annenkirche, where it was placed to the right of the altar. After the reconstruction of the Kreuzkirche, it was placed in the vestibule in 1955; it has remained there to the present day.

A special feature is the preserved epitaph of Hieronymus Schaffhirt. He was the owner of the Dresden paper mill and found his final resting place in 1578 in the 24th Schwibbogen of the Frauenkirchhof. His grave was adorned with a relief of the crucifixion of Christ made from paper dough. The paper dough relief, which was originally painted, first came into the possession of the Maternihospital and was transferred to the Dresdner Stadtmuseum before 1900. It is part of the permanent exhibition on the History of Dresden.

The epitaph by Hans von Dehn-Rothfelser came into the possession of the Old Church in Leuben. It was first stored in the Leuben churchyard, where it was found in 1876 and restored the following year. Initially placed in the Old Leuben Parish Church, it was moved to the altar area in the Himmelfahrtskirche in 1901, where it has been preserved. Walter Hentschel described it in 1963 as the "only almost complete work" of the cemetery.

The centerpiece of the epitaph of Ernst von Miltitz is located at Siebeneichen Castle in Meissen; von Miltitz was the builder of the castle. Fragments of the epitaph of Christoph von Taubenheim, which was created in 1556 and is therefore the oldest datable tomb in the Frauenkirche courtyard, owns the Dresden Annenkirche.

The central relief of Heinrich von Schönberg's epitaph (1575) with a crucifixion scene was initially transferred to the Eliasfriedhof and used there as a burial monument for the Martiensen-Benads family at the beginning of the 19th century. It is now in the possession of the Dresden City Museum. Among other things, an alabaster relief from the epitaph of Günther and Sarah von Bünau from 1562 and the essay from the epitaph of Caspar von Ziegler depicting the resurrection of Christ (second half of the 16th century) are also in the possession of the Dresden City Museum, but are not part of the exhibition on Dresden's city history.

=== The room of gravestones ===
In the lower church of the Frauenkirche, which was completed in 1996, Chapel G, known as "The Room of Gravestones", was set up to the north-east. For this room, 13 tombstones, some of which were only fragmentarily preserved, were selected from the collection of the Lapidarium Zionskirche and restored. The sandstone works were mounted on the walls. These are the following gravestones:

- Tomb of an unknown person, 17th century, sandstone (inventory number of the archaeological debris removal F 10077)
- Tomb of Anna Margaretha Brehme, wife of Christian Brehme, 1652 (F 10080)
- Double tomb of Michael and Christina Haupt, 1678 resp. 1709 (F 10079)
- Tomb of Margaretha Helmert, 1664 (F 10065)
- Tomb of Daniel Voigt, 1657 (F 10094)
- Tomb of an unknown person, 1678 (F 10084)
- Tomb of an unknown person, 17th century (F 10073)
- Tomb of an unknown person, 17th century (F 10073) Century (F 10073)
- Tomb of Khilian Richter, 1649 (F 10081)
- Tomb of Maria von Sütphen, 1651 (F 10085)
- Tomb of an unknown person, 17th century (F 10091)
- Tomb of an unknown person, 16th century (F 10082)
- Tomb of Johanna Sophia Dornblüth, 1704 (F 10078)
- Tomb of Anna Maria Schmidt, 1700 (F 11519)

== Grave goods ==
Around 300 graves and tombs were examined during archaeological excavations from October 1994 to August 1995. Various grave goods were recovered, including around 70 gold rings and 40 silver crucifixes. Jewelry rings set with precious stones, gold bracelets and necklaces made of amber and glass beads as well as a gold pectoral were also found. Graves contained the remains of book bindings and book fittings, which may have come from Bibles or hymn books. Parts of funeral and mourning clothes were also found in the graves. Remains of fabric and parts of leather shoes were also found. Investigations of a grave of an eleven to fifteen-year-old girl found in the block also revealed that some of the dead were buried in colorful everyday clothing.

Around 50 funeral crownss were recovered from tombs and richly decorated burials. Funerary crowns had previously only been found in Dresden during archaeological excavations at the Sophienkirche. The mortuary crowns were in varying states of preservation, with crowns from earth burials being rather poorly preserved. Better preserved crowns came from burials in tombs and some were almost completely preserved apart from slight deformations. Individual crowns were restored. They are made of copper or iron and have decorations including silk flowers and pearls (possibly of the river pearl mussel).

Simple wooden crosses were recovered during excavations in the early 2000s. Some of the findings from the Frauenkirchhof excavations, including restored funeral crowns, were presented to the public in 2005 as part of the exhibition Excavations at Dresden's Neumarkt - At the foot of the Frauenkirche

== Reception ==
=== Johann Gottfried Michaelis ===
As early as 1680, Anton Weck recognized in his chronicle that the epitaphs in the cemetery and in the church should be preserved for posterity through a description. In his chronicle of the city of Dresden, he limited himself to a list of the noble families who were buried in the Frauenkirche and in the churchyard. Johann Gottfried Michaelis, the Frauenkirche's church compiler, finally recorded all 1351 grave monuments and inscriptions in the cemetery and the church and published them in 1714 in his work Dreßdnische Inscriptiones und Epitaphia. The aim was that "these still existing epitaphia and monumenta may be preserved by public printing / and protected from premature destruction." By 1714, the oldest graves in the churchyard only dated from around 1550; even the grave of Hieronymus Emser, who died in 1527, had not survived. Michaelis also noted that "many epitaphs cannot be recognized due to age / many gravestones can no longer be read".

Michaelis' work was divided into three books: Liber I dealt with the epitaphs and gravestones in the Frauenkirche, Liber II dealt with the vaulted graves on the church and church wall and Liber III described the gravesites in the churchyard. Each grave site was described in its location, Michaelis quoted the grave inscription and determined the material and the thematic representation on the grave or briefly described the grave decoration. Walter Hentschel called Michaelis' work "worthy of thanks" in 1963; its content goes beyond a purely statistical or family-historical significance, as "surviving works [...] at least give us an approximate idea of the shape of the monuments he describes[...]." Other art historians praised the work because the precise description of the epitaphs and gravestones made it possible to identify surviving works and reminded us of the cultural and historical loss that accompanied the secularization of the cemetery.

Presumably in the 1960s, 13 drawings of epitaphs of different sizes were found in the Kupferstichkabinett Dresden, twelve of which Walter Hentschel was able to identify as depictions of funerary monuments from the Frauenkirche. The drawings were executed in ink and washed with gray paint. Hentschel assumed that the pictures were intended as a supplement to Michaelis' work and dated them to the first third of the 18th century. The epitaphs depicted are those of Ernst von Miltitz, Wolf von Schönberg, Caspar von Ziegler, Christoph von Taubenheim, Antonius von Ebeleben, Haugold Pflug, Heinrich von Schönburg, Heinrich von Schönberg, Balthasar von Worm, the double epitaph of Georg von Zschieren and Margarethe von Kalckreuter, the double epitaph of Christoph and Maria von Ragewitz and the epitaph of Eustachius von Harras. The discovery of the images made it possible to identify numerous surviving epitaph fragments.

=== Legends ===
Various myths have grown up around the Frauenkirchhof. The best-known myth is that of the so-called Mönchstein. This was a gravestone from 1388 depicting a life-size monk, which was still lying near the entrance to Rampische Gasse in 1680. By 1714 it was no longer extant. Cornelius Gurlitt assumed that this stone was found in 1471. In that year, the stonemasons received beer, "do sy denn leichstein zu der sonnenn erhubenn". The inscription on the Mönchstein was illegible. Michaelis wrote that people "are said to have practised a lot of superstition with the stone".

It was said of another grave in the cemetery that the woman buried there, Perpetua Geißin, was resurrected and later became a mother of seven. She was "awakened" by the gravedigger, who wanted to pull the gold rings from the fingers of the supposedly deceased.

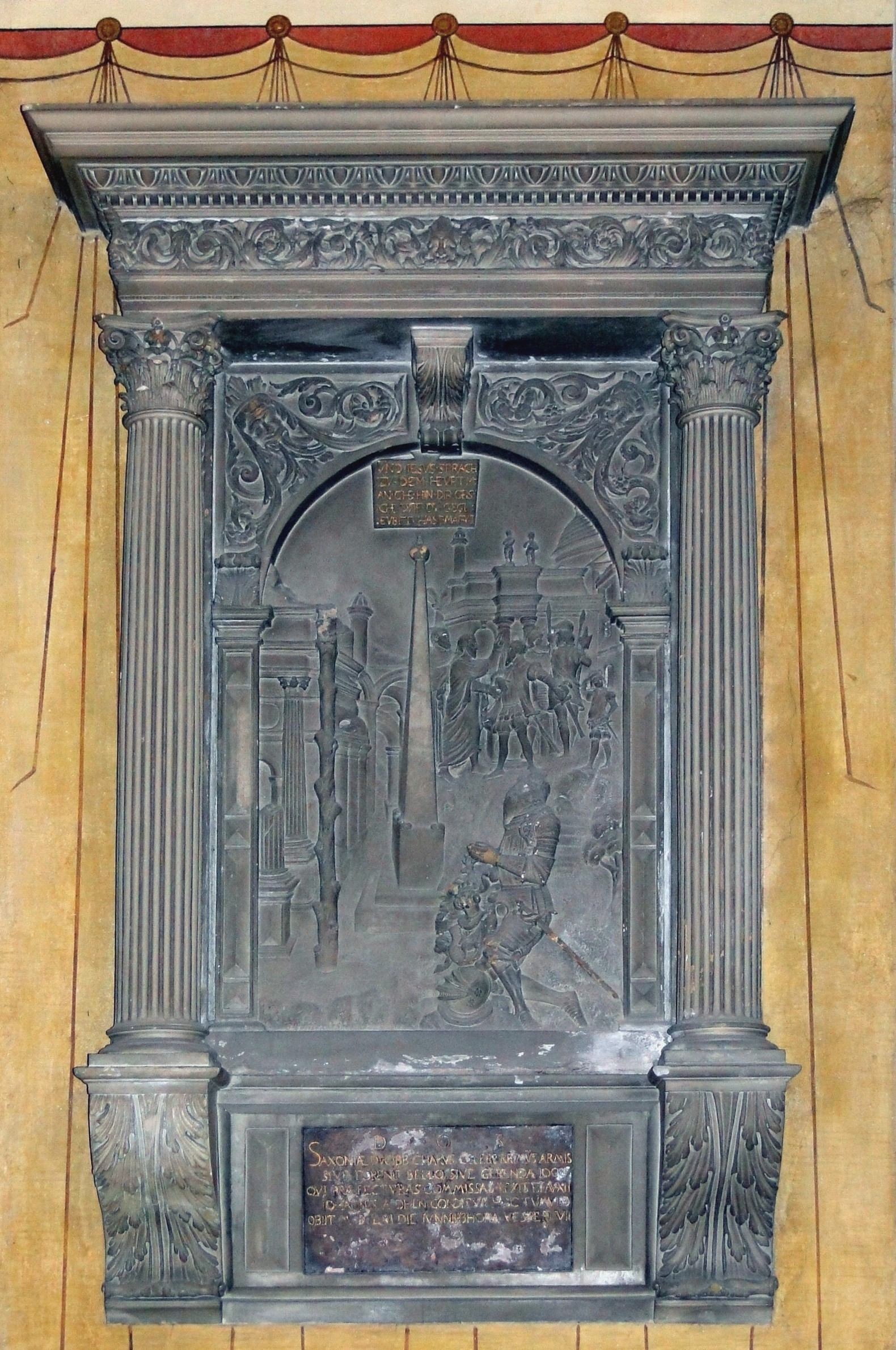
Epitaph Dehn-Rothfelser

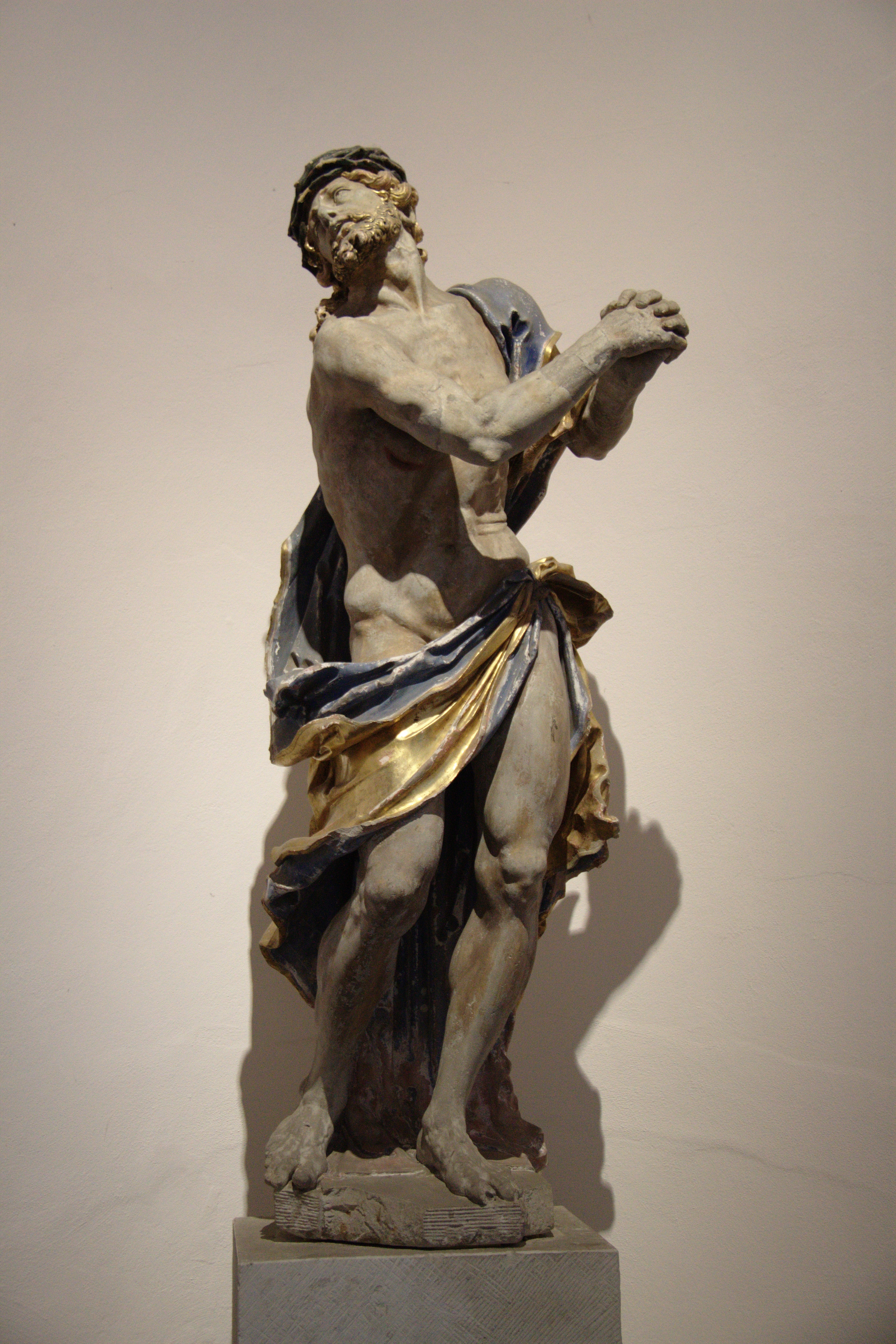
Ecce homo from the epitaph of David Pfeifer

== Personalities who were buried in the Frauenkirchhof ==
- Tobias Beutel (c. 1627-1690), mathematician and astronomer, art treasurer and electoral secretary
- Christian Brehme (1613-1667), poet and mayor
- Abraham Conrad Buchau (1623-1703), sculptor
- Conrad Buchau (c. 1600-1657), sculptor
- Paul Buchner (1531-1607), master builder
- Wilhelm Dilich (1571-1650), topographer and historian
- Hieronymus Emser (1478-1527), Catholic theologian and opponent of Martin Luther
- Heinrich Göding (1531-1606), court painter, engraver and miniaturist
- Hans Hase (1525-1591), mayor of Dresden
- Melchior Hauffe († 1572), field captain, master builder
- Zacharias Hegewald (1596-1639), sculptor
- Peter Heige (1559-1599), jurist
- Elias Jentzsch (1599-1652), alderman, municipal judge and mayor
- Franz Jünger (1613-1680), mayor
- Jakob Krause (1531/32-1585), court bookbinder to the Electorate of Saxony
- Nikolaus Krell (c. 1550-1601), chancellor
- Adam Krieger (1634-1666), composer
- Bastian Kröß (1524-1602), electoral valet, Dresden councillor and mayor
- Jonas Möstel (1540-1607), Dresden town clerk and mayor
- David Peifer (1530-1602), jurist, court councillor, chancellor
- Antonio Scandello (1517-1580), Italian composer
- Valentin Schäfer (1592-1666), councillor and mayor
- Hieronymus Schaffhirt (1530-1578), papermaker, municipal judge
- Christian Schiebling (1603-1663), painter
- Heinrich von Schönberg († 1575), electoral chief court marshal
- Aegidius Strauch I (1583-1657), theologian
- Benedetto Tola (before 1525-1572), painter
- Gabriele Tola (before 1525-circa 1583), musician and painter
- Melchior Trost (c. 1500-1559), stonemason and master builder
- Andreas Walther II (c. 1530-c. 1583), sculptor and gunsmith
- Andreas Walther III (c. 1560-1596), sculptor
- Christoph Walther I (1493-1546), sculptor
- Christoph Walther II (1534-1584), sculptor
- Christoph Walther III (1550-1592), painter, sculptor and court organist
- Christoph Walther IV (1572-1626), sculptor
- Christoph Abraham Walther (1625-1680), sculptor
- Hans Walther (1526-1586), sculptor and mayor of Dresden
- Michael Walther (c. 1574-1624), sculptor
- Sebastian Walther (1576-1645), sculptor
- Centurio Wiebel (1616-1684), painter
- Caspar Vogt von Wierandt (c. 1500-1560), master fortress builder

== Literature ==
- Jens Beutmann: Die Ausgrabungen auf dem Dresdner Neumarkt – Befunde zu Stadtbefestigung, Vorstadtbebauung und Friedhof. In: State Office for Archaeology with State Museum of Prehistory (ed.): Arbeits- und Forschungsberichte zur Sächsischen Bodendenkmalpflege. Band 48/49, 2006/2007. DZA, Altenburg 2008, S. 155–243 (darin: Friedhof. p. 197–201).
- Peter Witzmann: Wiederentdeckte Grabdenkmäler vom Kirchhof der Alten Frauenkirche zu Dresden. In: Landesamt für Archäologie mit Landesmuseum für Vorgeschichte (Hrsg.): Arbeits- und Forschungsberichte zur sächsischen Bodendenkmalpflege. Band 53/54, 2011/2012. DZA, Altenburg 2012, S. 501–516.
- Cornelius Gurlitt: Die Frauenkirche. In: Cornelius Gurlitt (Bearb.): Beschreibende Darstellung der älteren Bau- und Kunstdenkmäler des Königreichs Sachsen. 21. Heft: Stadt Dresden. C. C. Meinhold & Söhne, Dresden 1900, S. 41–79.
- Johann Gottfried Michaelis: Dreßdnische Inscriptiones und Epitaphia. Welche Auf denen Monumentis derer in Gott ruhenden, so allhier in und außer der Kirche zu unser Lieben Frauen begraben liegen …. Schwencke, Alt-Dresden 1714 (Digitalisat).
- Otto Richter: Der Frauenkirchhof, Dresdens älteste Begräbnisstätte. In: Dresdner Geschichtsblätter. Nr. 2, 1894, S. 124–134.
- Edeltraud Weid: „Keine armen Seelen“. Die Ausgrabung auf dem Frauenkirchhof in Dresden. In: archäologie aktuell im Freistaat Sachsen. Nr. 3, 1995, S. 223–225.
