= Ehrlichsche Gestiftskirche =

Church in Germany

Coordinates: 51°02′48″N 13°45′17″E

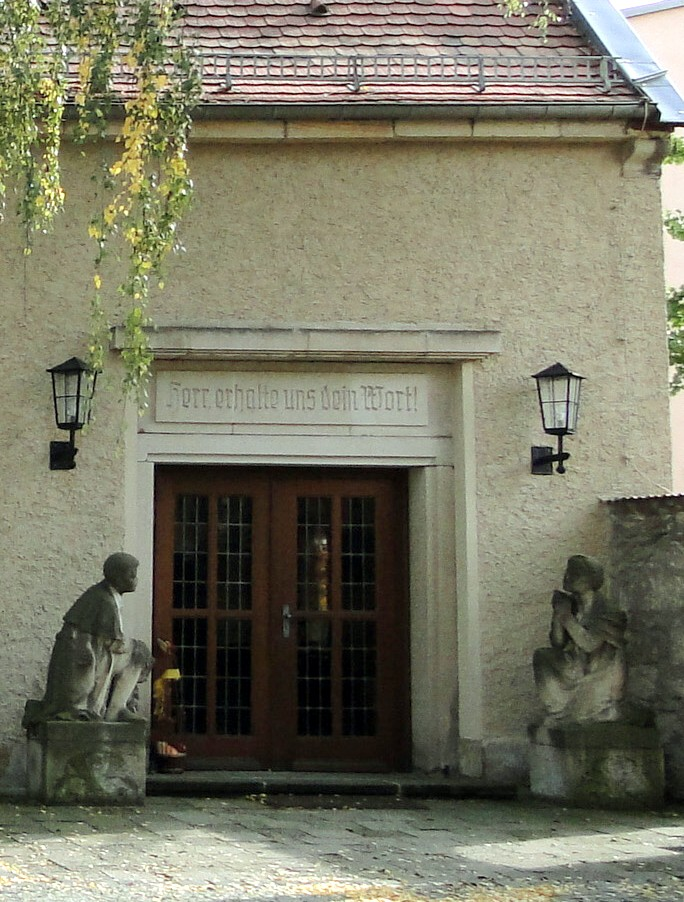
Eingang Nazarethkirche Dresden

The Ehrlichsches Gestift was a historicist church building in Dresden. It was built in 1907 on Stübelplatz to replace the Ehrlichsches Gestift's older church (Lazarettkirche) on Wettiner Platz, which had been demolished in 1897 to build the new Jakobikirche. It survived the Second World War but was demolished in August 1951.
