= Protestantism in Germany =

Religion in Germany (2025 estimate)
1. No religion (48.1%)
2. Catholicism (23.0%)
3. Protestantism (20.8%)
4. Eastern Orthodoxy (1.50%)
5. Other Christians (1.00%)
6. Islam, excluding Alevism (4.00%)
7. Alevism (0.80%)
8. Buddhism (0.20%)
9. Judaism (0.10%)
10. Hinduism (0.10%)
11. Yazidism (0.10%)
12. Other religions (0.30%)

Protestantism (German: Protestantismus), a branch of Christianity, was founded within Germany in the 16th-century Reformation. It was formed as a new direction from some Roman Catholic principles. It was led initially by Martin Luther and later by John Calvin.

== History ==
The Protestant Reformation began with the publication of the Ninety-five Theses by Augustinian friar Martin Luther in 1517. The key element of this religious upheaval was a break from Roman Catholicism's emphasis on tradition, favouring a focus on the Bible. The lasting effects of Luther's Protestant movement within Germany was to question its existing power structures, imploring lay nobles for church reformation, critiquing the Roman mass, sacraments and seeking to reaffirm the importance of faith in good works. His subsequent excommunication from the Church ensured Germany had an ideological divide between Protestant sects and other Christian denominations. Another prominent reformer, Martin Bucer, introduced the rite of communion to German Protestantism and promoted Protestant unity, ensuring the anti-Baptist sect re-joined the wider church. John Calvin, whose writings formulated the Calvinist movement, emphasised the importance of Old Testament Law. Luther called upon the assistance of German princes to further the Protestant movement, namely Phillip of Hesse who convened the Marburg Colloquy where key Protestant theologians agreed on theological questions relevant to Germany. The Marburg Colloquy reforms included a restructuring of the Protestant Church in the light of the early church, the dissolution of monastic communities, establishment of Protestant universities, the regular inspection of Parishes and the conversion of nuns and monks. The Thirty Years' War, which took place from 1618 to 1648, stunted the theological development of Protestantism in Germany due to the severe reduction in population it triggered, with estimates suggesting as much as 90% of the German population was lost and barbary was common.

== Branches ==
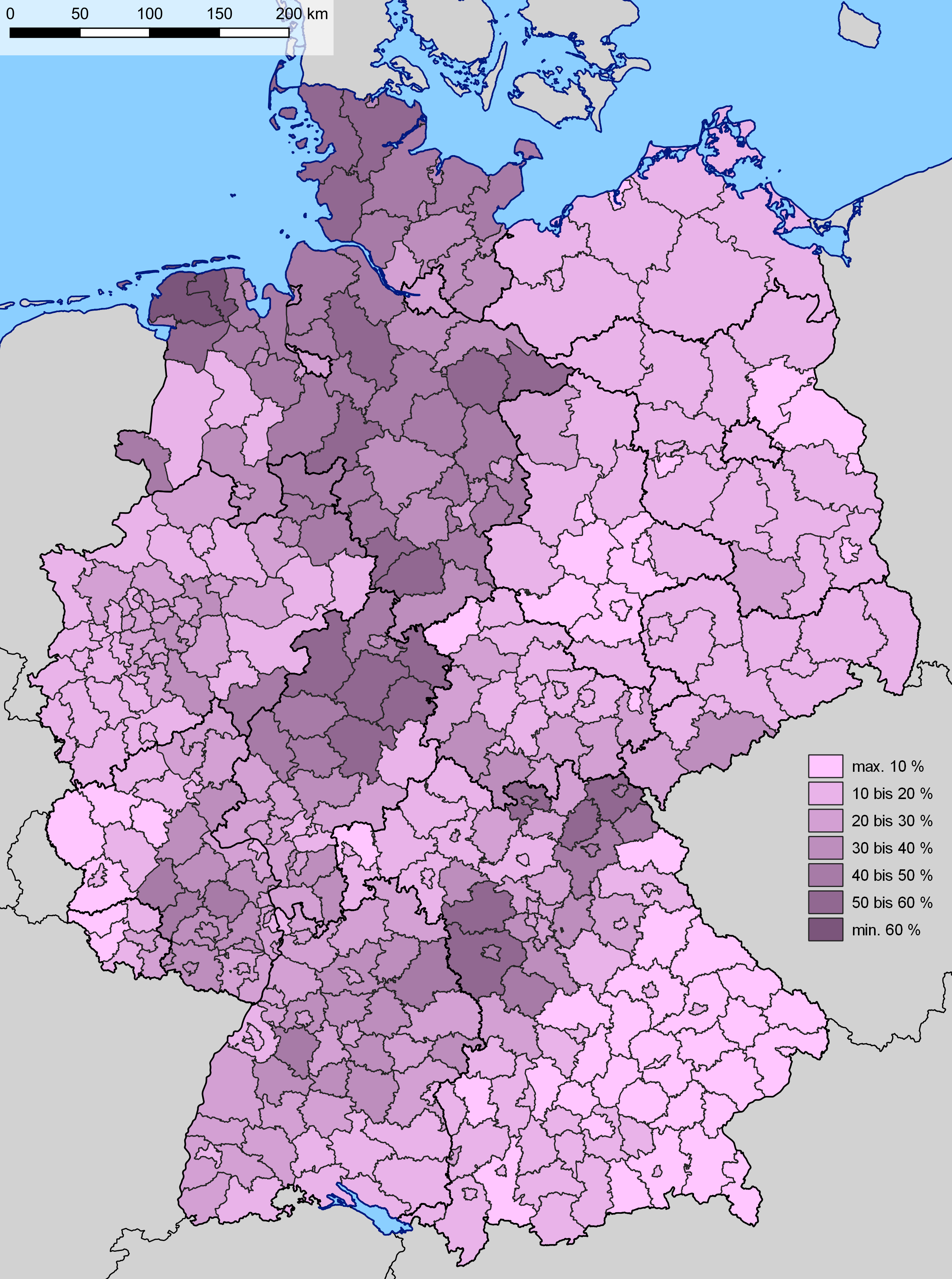
Distribution of the evangelical (lutheran, reformed and united regional churches) population of Germany by district (Landkreise and kreisfreie Städte), according to the census 2022. The largest category of the legend is “min. 60 %”, because there is no district in which there are at least 70 % of evangelical population.

=== Lutheranism in Germany ===
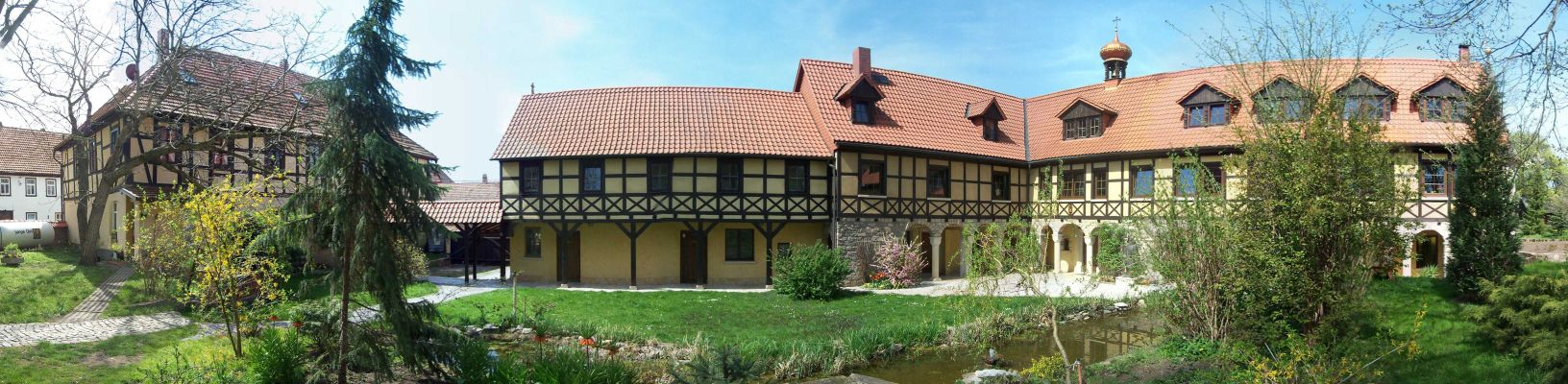
The Priory of St. Wigbert, a Lutheran monastery in the Benedictine tradition

Lutheranism spread in Germany through the work of Martin Luther. Lutheranism teaches three sacraments, including baptism, confession and absolution, and eucharist. The Independent Evangelical-Lutheran Church is a Confessional Lutheran body in Germany. A number of Lutheran monasteries, convents and religious orders are present in Germany, such as the Priory of St. Wigbert.

=== Reformed Christianity in Germany ===
Continental Reformed Protestantism spread in Germany, originating through the efforts of the reformer John Calvin. Reformed Christianity (Calvinism) gained support in Germany in 1604 when Maurice, Landgrave of Hesse-Kassel converted from Lutheranism. His conversion prompted serious backlash against the Calvinists from the predominantly Lutheran population in Hesse. In 1613, the Reformed gained another prominent convert, John Sigismund, Elector of Brandenburg. Eventually, Brandenburg would become a bi-confessional state, allowing for both Lutheranism and Calvinism, and the Electors of Brandenburg often advocated for their persecuted Reformed (Calvinist) brethren.

Reformed Christianity upholds covenant theology.

Two Reformed denominations are members of the Protestant Church in Germany including the Protestant Reformed Church and the Church of Lippe.

== Political effects ==
=== Separation of church and state ===
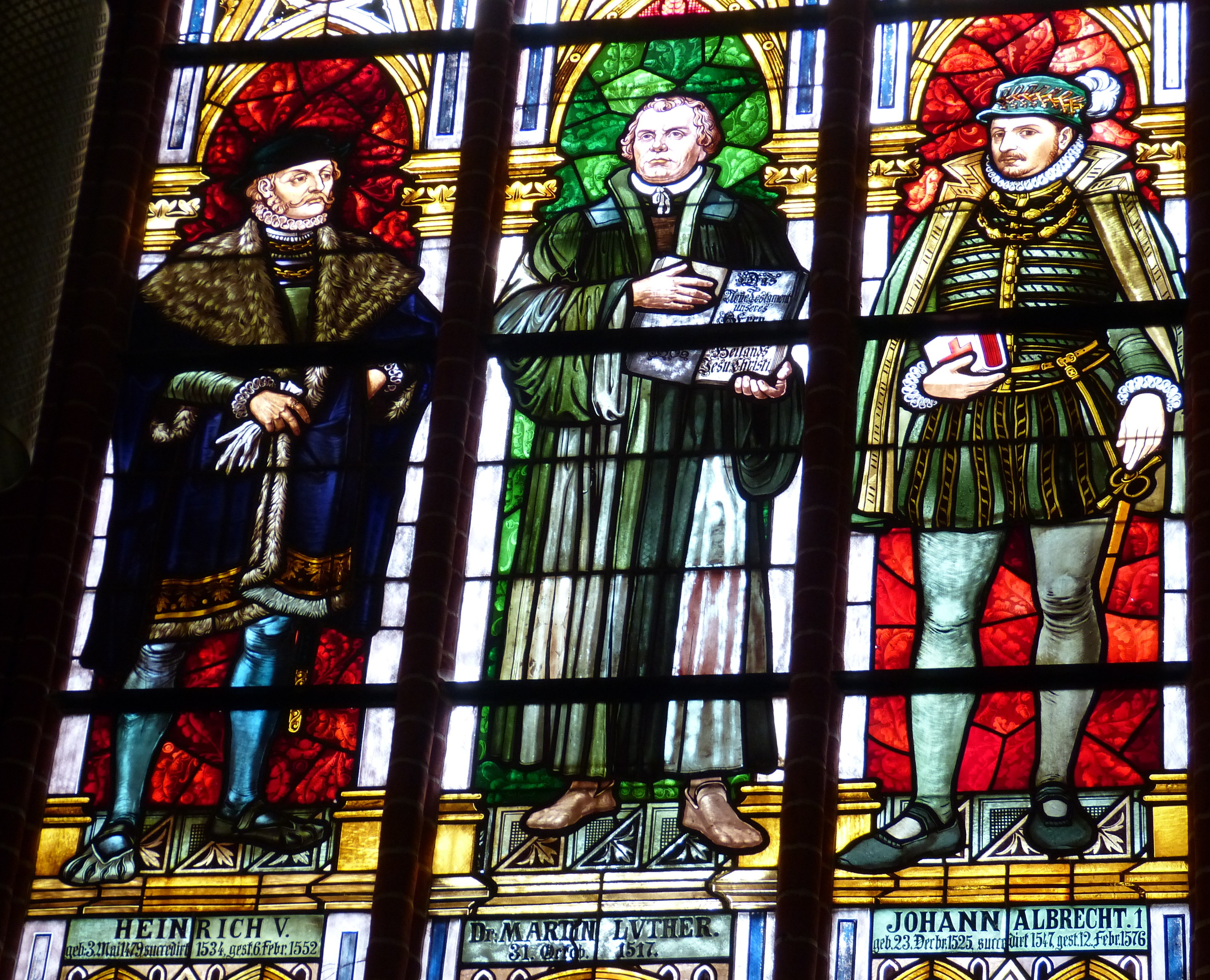
Stained glass window within the Sternberg Protestant Parish in Mecklenburg, commemorating the introduction of Protestantism in the region in 1549.

In the early 1500s, the Holy Roman Empire led by Charles V treated German Protestantism as a competitor to its geo-political power, issuing a decree in 1524 banning the recitation of its Lutheran works. This prompted riots across Germany and in 1529 a formal protestation was issued by a body of Protestant leaders and Princes, claiming the need for a clear separation from the Imperial Diet and the right to autonomy. In February 1531, prominent Protestant Princes formed the League of Schmalkalden, endorsed by Luther, with the intent to defend the rights of princes and the religion. The league became central to the spread of Protestantism by using its political sway in Germany, helping the restoration of the Lutheran Duke of Wurttemberg in 1534, enabling the establishment of Protestantism in the region. Conflicts with the Holy Roman Empire, resolved by the 1548 Council of Trent, maintained a lack of concessions to the German Protestants, and country-wide riots ensured it was not accepted. The official separation of Protestantism and the state in Germany came with the adoption of the Weimar Constitution in 1919.

=== Rebirth of political Protestantism ===
In the 19th century, Johann Hinrich Wichern pioneered a Protestant movement, the Inner mission, that sought a rebirth of the Church in Germany but also a greater emphasis on gaining support for social welfare and relief programs among Protestants. Throughout the 19th century Protestant churches in Germany were reactionary and politically conservative. Protestant theologians rejected the tenets of the French Revolution, seeing instead an increase in nationalism. This nationalism, was combined with piety, evidenced by the notable addresses of Johann Gottlieb Fichte's "Address to the German Nations" and Ernst Moritz Arndt's writings against Napoleon Bonaparte.

=== Nazi Germany ===
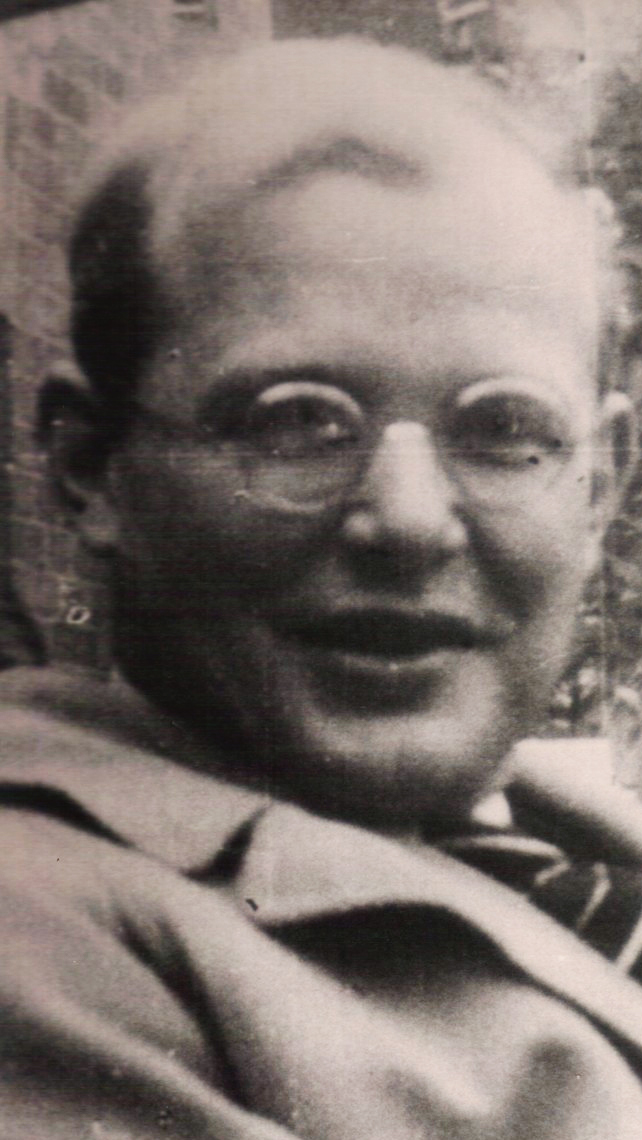
German Lutheran Pastor Dietrich Bonhoeffer in 1938.

During the Third Reich, over three-fifths of the population were Protestant and were divided among the Confessing Church, German Christians and those unaffiliated to either. In the early 20th century, anti-Semitic writings of Martin Luther were used by some Protestant pastors and Nazi leaders to bolster their political movement. Protestant pastors, bishops and theologians utilised Luther's writings, such as Von den Juden and ihren Lügen (On the Jews and Their Lies), to reaffirm the anti-Jewish prejudice escalating in Germany. During one 1927 Protestant Church Congress in Konigsberg, Paul Althaus gave a famous keynote address deriding the Überfremdung ('foreign invasion') of the arts, fashion and finance industries, reflecting the anti-Semitism of many church leaders. There were actions taken by some church members to fight against Nazism, such as Dietrich Bonhoeffer who rescued multiple Jews in Operation 7. The Confessing Church in particular maintained objections to merging of the Protestant Church and Nazi state, resulting in some being sent to concentration camps. Several leading church figures, however, published substantial anti-Semitic publications, such as the Thuringian bishop Martin Sasse who distributed thirty-seven thousand copies of Martin Luther über die Juden: Weg mit ihnen! (Martin Luther on the Jews: Away with Them!). As the Nazi Party gained power, it actively destroyed the institutional structures of the Protestant church itself. After the fall of Nazi power post-1945, the wider church conducted a de-Nazification effort. At the conclusion of World War II, leading church clergy issued the Stuttgart Declaration of Guilt, which acknowledged the inadequacy of church opposition to Nazism and their culpability in the regime's power. With an increase in Protestant church pacifism after the end of Nazism, the German Protestant Church Assembly was formed as a forum to discuss the direction of the church. Former German chancellor Angela Merkel has been a regular attendant.

=== Communism and the German Democratic Republic, 1949–1990 ===
In the initial years of communist rule, despite pressure on pastors to endorse the new form of government, the Protestant church insisted on remaining impartial. The Communist Party, however, grew hostile to the church, moving to replace the festival of Christmas with celebrations of the birthday of Joseph Stalin, along with the jailing of more than 70 Evangelical pastors and lay workers from January 1953. One popular Protestant pastor, Siegfried Schmutzler, was imprisoned for five years after a show trial, charged with "agitation to boycott the republic". Censorship against Protestantism was also employed, with several West German church periodicals banned by the government, including the official Lutheran Church organ Evangelisch-Lutherische Kirchenzeitung. Official government orders, such as the 15 February 1956 Fechner Decree, banned religious instruction before school. In terms of political involvement, Protestant Church leaders also pushed for the introduction of the policies of Mikhail Gorbachev, including glasnost and perestroika policies in the German Democratic Republic (GDR). As a result of concerted state intrusions against Protestantism, the church became a place to organise opposition against the Soviet rule of the region. This opposition increased citizens' church involvement; however, the end of the German Democratic Republic led to a demographic decline in the Protestant church as the role of political activism was lost. In terms of political affiliations throughout the German Democratic Republic era, members of the Protestant Church ranged from far-left Stalinists to anti-communist conservatives.

Protestants in East Germany 1949–1989	No. of members	No. parishes	No. of pastors
Lutheran (Werner Leich, Chairman)	6,435,000	7,347	4,161
Methodist (Rüdiger Minor, Bishop of Dresden)	28,000	400	140
Baptist Federation (Manfred Suit, President)	20,000	222	130
Reformed (HansJürgen Sievers, Chairman)	15,000	24	20
Old Lutheran (Johannes Zellmer, President)	7,150	27	22
Total	6,505,150	8,020	4,473

== Economic effects ==
The initial effect of the Protestant revolution in Germany was to facilitate the entry of entrepreneurship with the decline of feudalism. The Lutheran literature dispersed throughout Germany after the Reformation called for the elimination of clerical tax exemptions and the economic privileges granted to religious institutions. Through the 16th century, however, the Protestant movement brought with it wealthy and influential Lutheran princes who formed a new social class.

== Social and cultural effects ==
=== Art ===
When the Reformation occurred, the art industry was declining in Germany; however, it provided a new inspiration for graphic arts, sculptures and paintings. Protestant churches displayed medieval images, along with uniquely Lutheran artistic traditions, such as the Wittenberg workshop of Lucas Cranach the Elder and Lucas Cranach the Younger. The Protestant movement brought a new variation of figural sculptures, portraits, artwork and illustrations to the interiors of German churches.

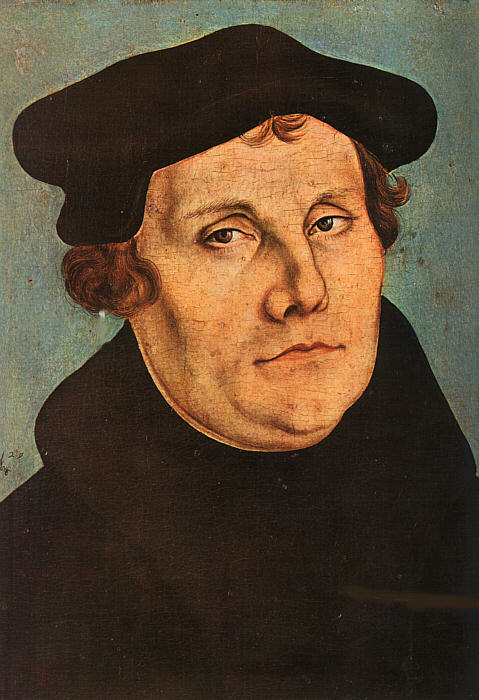
Portrait of Martin Luther by Lucas Cranach, 1562

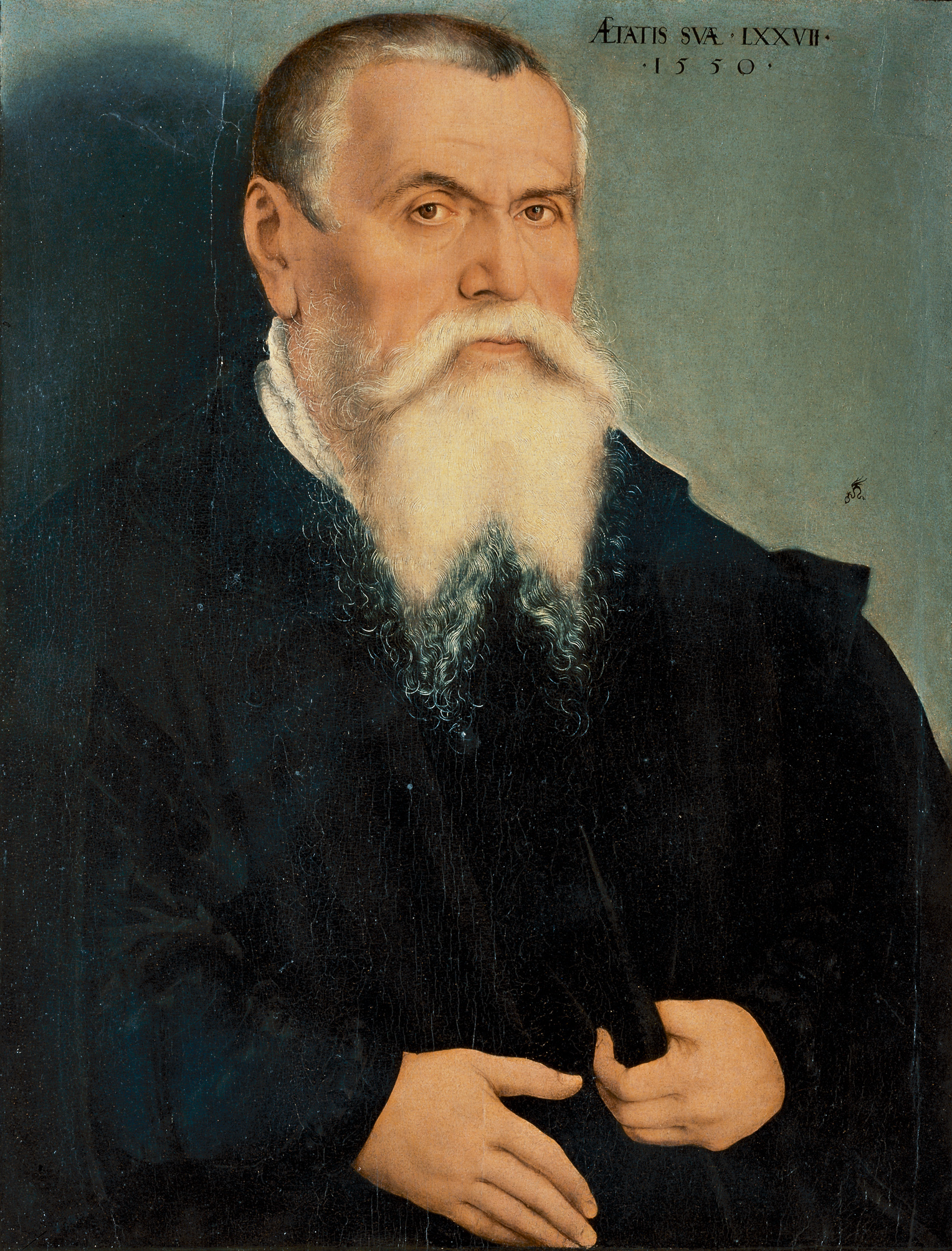
Portrait of Lucas Cranach the Elder

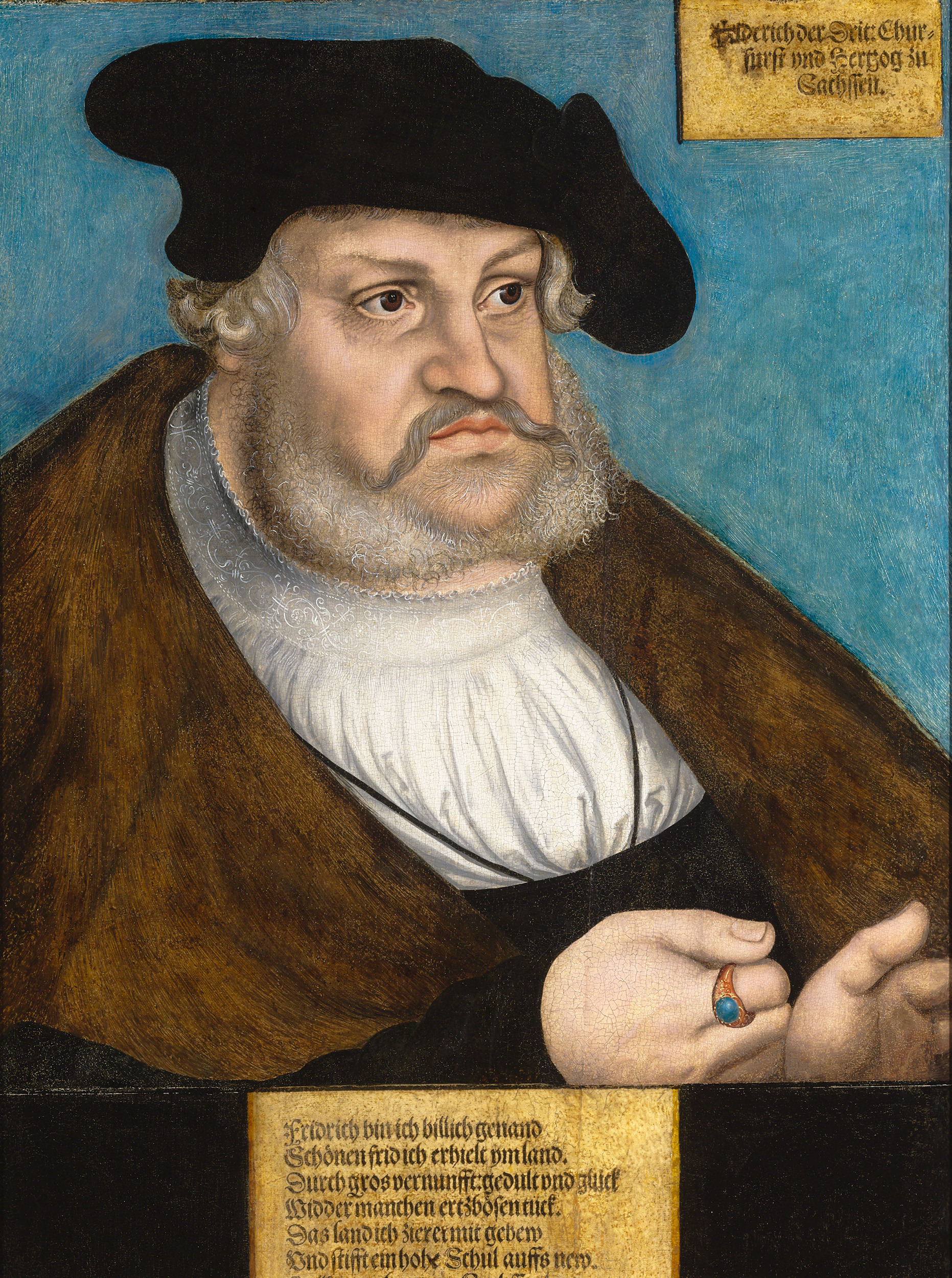
Portrait of Frederick the Wise by Lucas Cranach the Elder

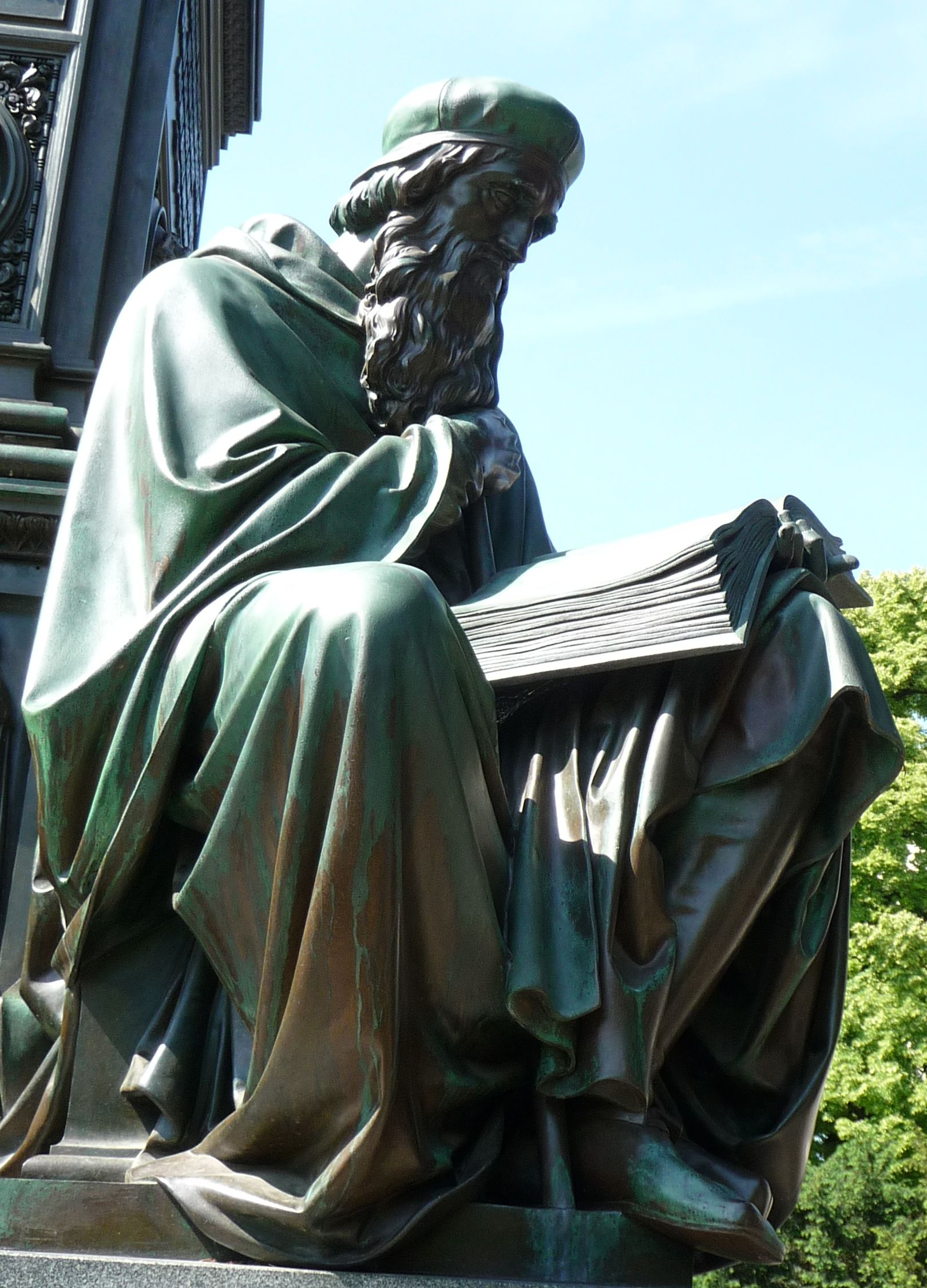
Bronze sculpture of Luther, 1868, Worms, Germany

=== Music ===
Martin Luther's early reforms included an emphasis on the value music provides as an aid to worship. New branches of Protestantism, however, such as Calvinism, reduced the role of liturgical music and the expression of faith through the development of music.

=== Education ===
In the immediate post-Reformation and subsequent decades, the Lutheran principle of sola scriptura prompted followers of the religion to promote the Bible, and the act of reading. The early Lutheran church documents promoted reading and the importance of education. Early reformers emphasised the value of literacy of the masses such that they were able to read the Bible, as well as strengths in mathematics and literacy. Lutheran Church teachings on the standards for the education of students were published in 1529, emphasising the study of grammar, definitions and the Latin language. To achieve literacy across Germany, every child was forced to memorise the church's catechism. At the Marburg Colloquy of October 1529, it was decided by Martin Luther, Phillip of Hesse, John Calvin, Phillip Melanchthon and other prominent German Protestant reformers, that a Protestant university should be formed. This became the University of Marburg, the oldest Protestant university in the world. By the 19th century, German universities were recognised as leading the Western world, with Protestant theology globally influenced by Friedrich Schleiermacher, Ernst Troeltsch, Julius Wellhausen and Adolf von Harnack. Within the GDR in the 1980s, the Church maintained Protestant theological faculties in six of the state universities in Berlin (Halle, Leipzig, Jena, Greifswald, and Rostock) funded by the Communist budget. The Protestant leadership protested the insertion of a "materialist view" on school students' writing and the alteration of textbooks to include Communist ideology.

=== Literature ===
In the years after the Reformation, Luther and his followers utilised the printing press to spread their ideas. The printing press enabled the dispersion of Protestant literature throughout greater Germany. In order to curb this dispersion, the 16th-century Council of Trent compiled an Index of Prohibited Books in 1559, which included the works of Protestant theologians and those who desired reform within the Church. This act reduced the ability for Protestant material to spread throughout Germany. One of the pioneers of Protestant literature was Phillip Melanchthon, who organised and consolidated the Lutheran movement in Germany in the early 16th century. His work Loci communes began the publication of Protestant dogmatics. He worked extensively to reform the German education system, local schooling and national universities.

=== Wider culture and theology ===
The Protestant church has influenced changes in wider culture in Germany, contributing to the debate around bioethics and stem cell research. The Protestant leadership in Germany is divided on the issue of stem cell research; however, those opposing liberalising laws have characterised it as a threat to the sanctity of human life. Within the German Democratic Republic, the Federation of Protestant Churches, formed in June 1969 and lasting until April 1991, was where questions of morality were determined.

=== Architecture ===
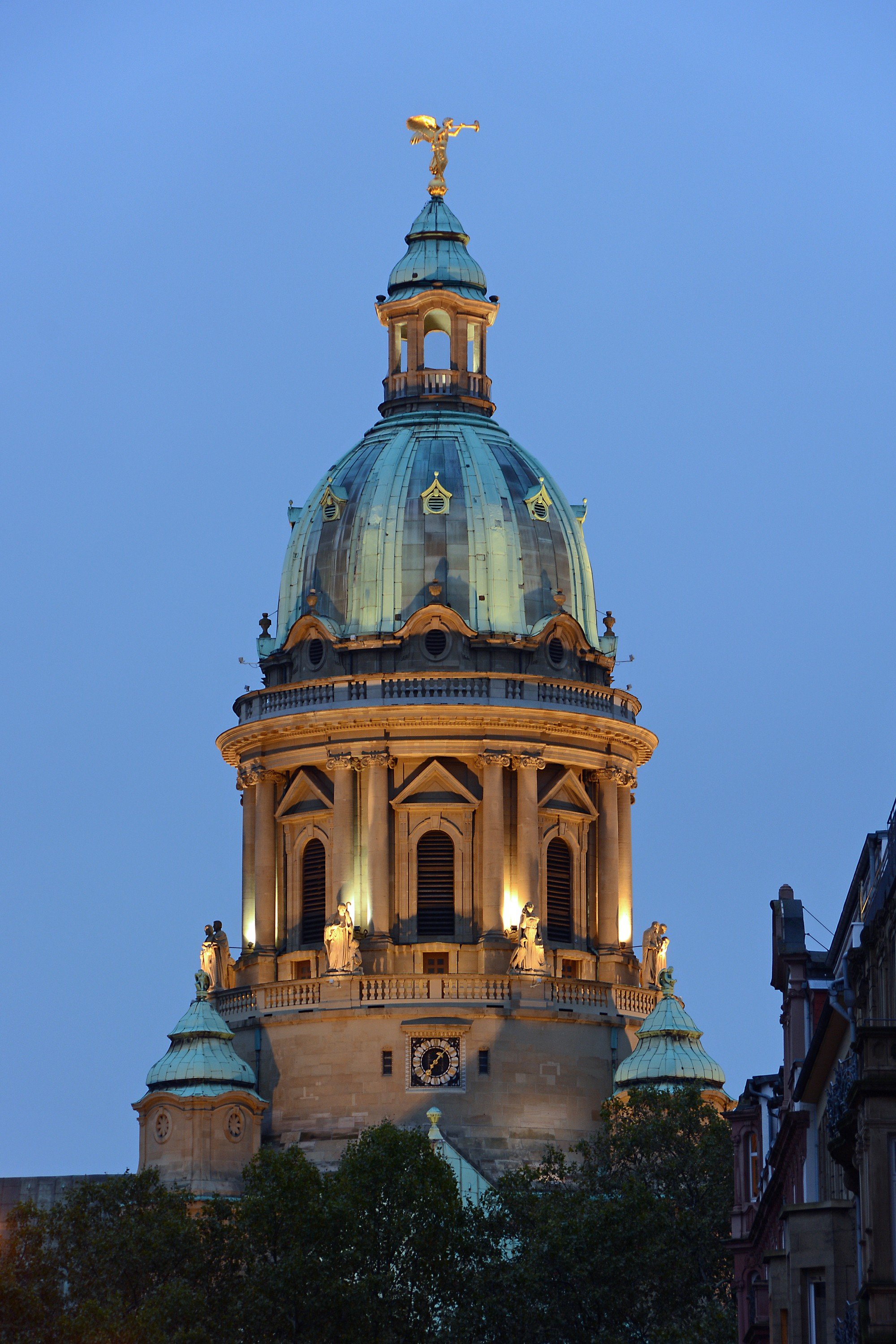
The Protestant Christ Church of Mannheim, completed in 1911.

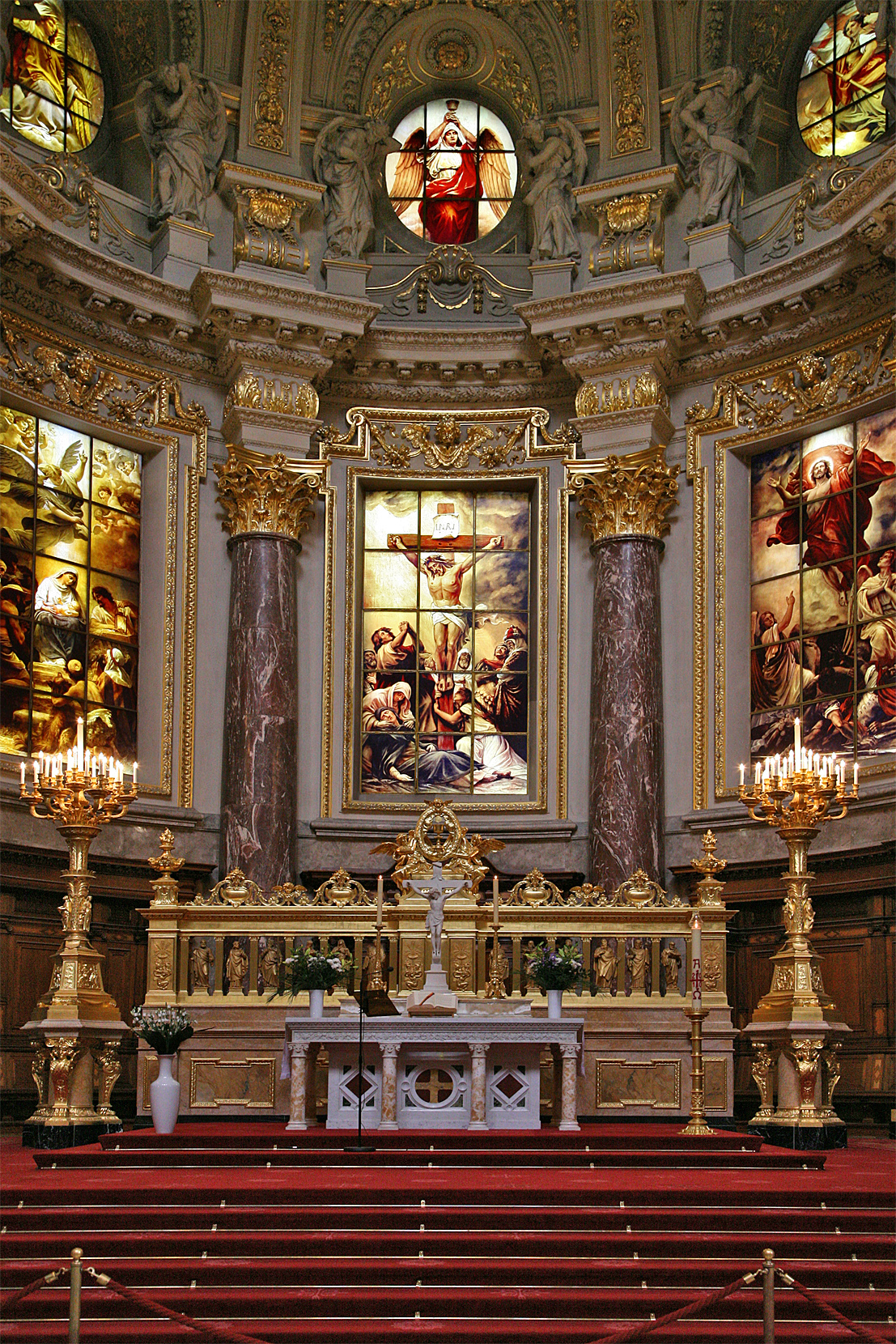
Protestant Cathedral erected in Berlin,1894.The altar is made of white marble, yellow onyx candleholders and gilded iron Apostles screen.

Protestant Church bells
Church bells playing at the Mannheim Protestant Christ Church

The Protestant church has influenced German architecture. Among adherents to Protestantism in Germany were engineers, craftsmen and architects, enabling Lutheran constructions. The earliest Protestant constructions were in the 17th century, where the castles built along Germany's Middle Rhine were inhabited by Protestant archbishops, joined only by nobles and princes. In the later centuries, separate church buildings were constructed along the Rhine region, due to controversial marriage laws that mandated Protestants and Catholics marry separately. The spreading of Protestant architecture was slower in other parts of Germany, however, such as the city of Cologne where its first Protestant church was constructed in 1857. Large Protestant places of worship were commissioned across Germany, such as the Garrison Church in the city of Ulm built in 1910 which could hold 2,000 congregants. In the early 1920s, architects such as Gottfried Böhm and Otto Bartning were involved in changing Protestant architecture towards modern constructions. An example of this new form of architecture was the Protestant Church of the Resurrection built in the city of Essen in 1929 by Bartning.

=== Media ===
The Protestant church published five regional papers throughout the GDR, including Die Kirche (Berlin, circulation 42,500; also in a Greifswald edition), Der Sonntag (Dresden, circulation 40,000), Mecklenburgische Kirchenzeitung (Mecklenburg, circulation 15,000), Glaube und Heimat (Jena, circulation 35,000), and Potsdamer Kirche (Potsdam, circulation 15,000).

=== Influences on Christianity within Germany ===
The reformation itself was grounded in a rebellion against the German Catholic church, emphasizing the primacy of the Bible, the abolition of the Catholic ritualistic mass and a rejection of clerical celibacy. The 19th century saw movements within German Protestantism involving practical devotion and spiritual energy. The 20th century saw the creation of new Protestant organisations, such as the Evangelical Alliance, YMCA, and the German Student Christian movement, whose active participation involved church adherents from other nations.

== See also ==
- Religion in Germany
- Baptists in Germany
- Roman Catholicism in Germany
- Eastern Orthodoxy in Germany
- Oriental Orthodoxy in Germany
- Culture of Europe
- Religion in Europe
- European wars of religion
- Criticism of Protestantism
- Protestantism and Islam
- Protestantism by country
