= Orthodoxy in Germany =

Orthodoxy in Germany may refer to:

- Eastern Orthodox Church in Germany
- Oriental Orthodoxy in Germany
