= Alte Kirche (Dresden-Leuben) =

Church in Dresden, Germany

Coordinates: 51°00′39″N 13°49′33″E

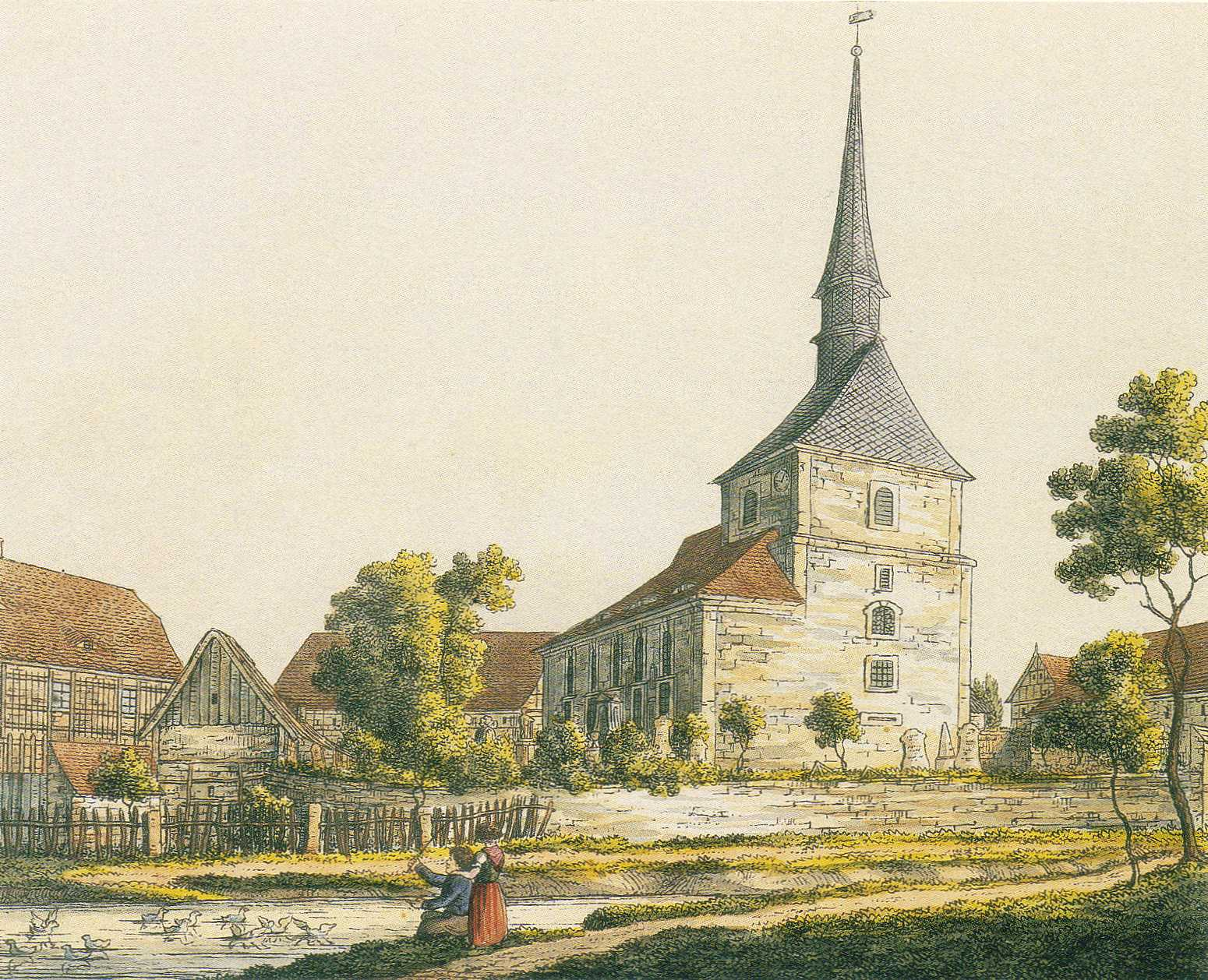
The church in 1820

The Alte Kirche (Old Church) was the oldest church building in the Leuben district of the German city of Dresden, built in 1512 (though there has been a parish was first set up in Leuben in 1362). The main church was demolished in 1901 after the construction of the Himmelfahrtskirche, but the tower survives as a cultural monument.
