= Schmutzler =

Schmutzler is a German surname. Notable people of the surname include the following:

- Fabian Schmutzler (born 2005), german darts player
- Leopold Schmutzler (1864–1940), Czech painter
- Nadine Schmutzler (born 1984), German rower
- Robert Schmutzler, German art historian
- Sabrina Schmutzler (born 1984), German footballer
- Siegfried Schmutzler (1915–2003), German educationist
