= Himmelfahrtskirche, Dresden =

Church in Dresden, Germany

Coordinates: 51°00′40″N 13°49′33″E

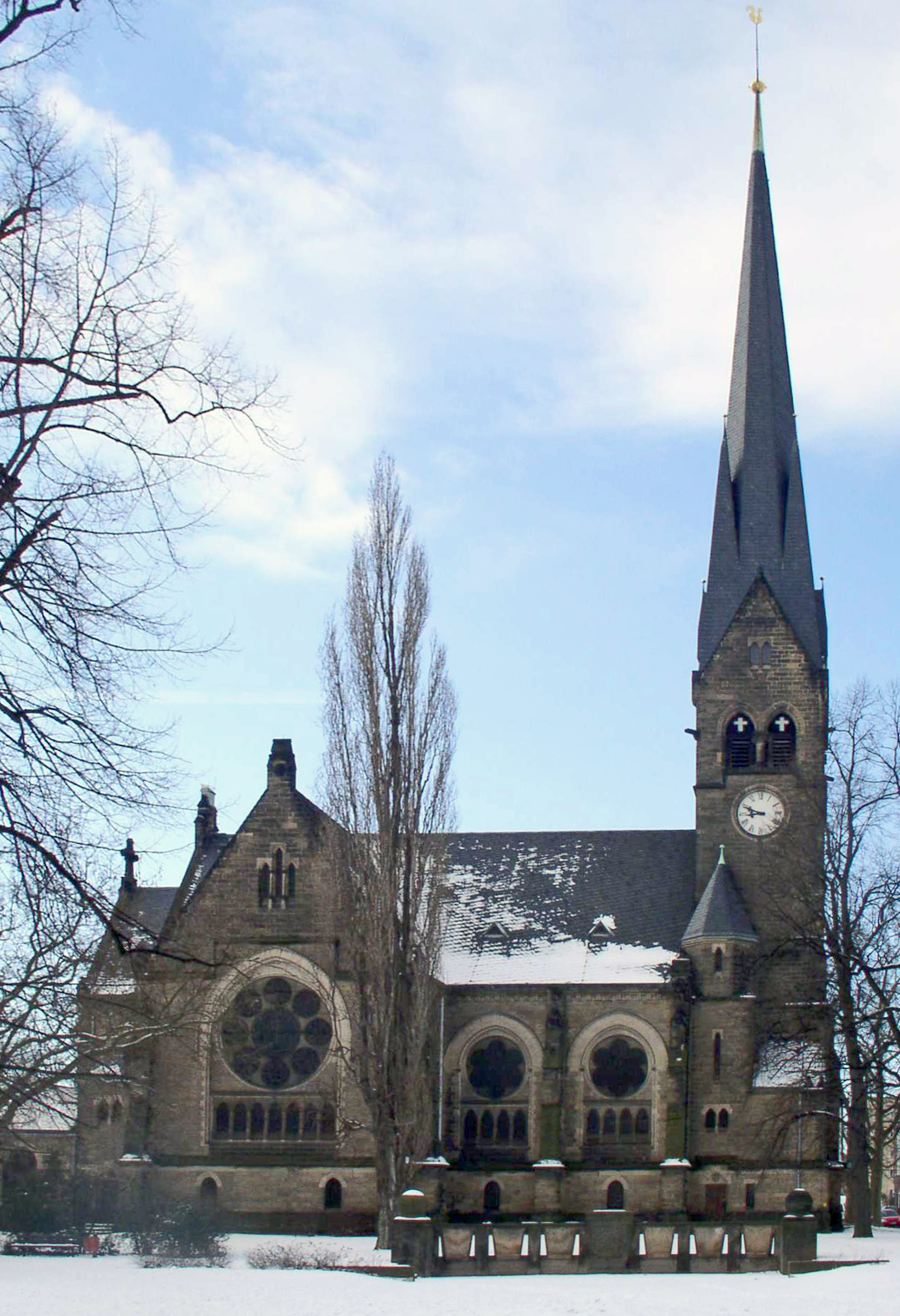
The Himmelfahrtskirche Leuben

The Himmelfahrtskirche (German pronunciation: [ˈhɪml̩faːɐ̯tsˌkɪʁçə]; Church of the Ascension) is a Protestant church in the Leuben district of Dresden. It was designed by Karl Emil Scherz and completed in 1901, replacing the Alte Kirche. It is a listed monument.
