= Siegfried Schmutzler =

German Evangelical Lutheran pastor

Ernst Georg Siegfried Schmutzler
- Born: 14 March 1915; Leipzig, Saxony, Germany
- Died: 11 October 2003 (aged 88); Berlin, Germany
- Occupations: Evangelical Lutheran pastor Opposition activist Show trial victim

(Ernst Georg) Siegfried Schmutzler (14 March 1915 – 11 October 2003) was a German Evangelical Lutheran pastor.

Schmutzler was also a political activist who campaigned against the Single-Party dictatorship of the German Democratic Republic. He hit the headlines as a victim of one of the show trials that proliferated in East Germany during the 1950s.

== Life ==
Schmutzler began university-level study of Pedagogy and Philosophy in 1933 before becoming, in 1939, a Primary school teacher. In 1941, Schmutzler was conscripted into the Wehrmacht and was deployed in Yugoslavia. During this time, he was involved in anti-partisan operations. He was captured, and remained a prisoner of war until February 1946. Schmutzler began to study Theology, concluding these studies in 1951. During this time he was also, in 1946/47, a local councilor in Markranstädt, a small town a short distance outside Leipzig. From 1954 till 1957 he was the pastor to the Evangelical Lutheran community at St. Peter's on the south side of Leipzig, and also Student Pastor for the city's evangelical student community. In this capacity he was highly critical of the prevailing official ideology in what had, by now, become a Soviet sponsored one-Party dictatorship.

On 5 April 1957 officers of the Ministry for State Security (Stasi) arrested Schmutzler in Leipzig, at his apartment in the Alfred Kästner Street After less than eight months of investigative detention he faced trial: he was found guilty of "incitement to boycott" ("Boykotthetze") and was sentenced to a further five years imprisonment. In the event he was released on 18 February 1961, having spent the intervening period in the prison at Torgau. The trial was recorded by the authorities and given wide publicity, which was a feature of East German show trials during the 1950s. A couple of weeks after the trial's conclusion, extracts from the judge's questioning of Schmutzler appeared in Der Spiegel, West Germany's widely respected (and widely read) news magazine. As Spiegel freely admitted, its record of the trial transcript was selective, and highlighted only the most "loaded" moments of the interrogation conducted on behalf of the East German Communist authorities. The transcript publication nevertheless gave to many of those who might have preferred not to know of the matter, a timely insight into the contemporary show-trial culture operating across the internal political (and subsequently physical) frontier that since 1949 had divided the two Germanys.

From 1961 Schmutzler was the pastor at St. James's church in nearby Dresden. Starting in the middle of 1968, Dr. Schmutzler also lectured on both philosophy and on Education at the Theological Seminary in Leipzig.

He retired in 1981 from his Dresden pastorate, and was able to relocate to West Berlin.

In November 1989 the breach by protestors of the Berlin Wall, and the subsequent discovery that Soviet troops had received no instructions to suppress the rising tide of street protest by force, triggered a succession of events that led to the demise of the German Democratic Republic as a stand-alone state and, formally in October 1990, German reunification. Siegfried Schmutzler was formally rehabilitated, politically, on 9 July 1991. In 1996 he was honoured with the national Order of Merit and on 17 September 1997 the city council awarded him one of the first Honour Medals of the City of Leipzig. Shortly after he died, at the age of 88, the city council passed a resolution, on 18 November 2004, to rename a street in the Gohlis-South district as "Schmutzlerstraße" ("Schmutzler Street").
