= Johann Georg Ehrlich =

German merchant and town councillor

Johann Georg Ehrlich (13 October 1676 – 8 February 1743) was a German merchant and town councillor from Dresden, Electorate of Saxony.

Ehrlich was born in Hennersdorf near Frauenstein. In addition to his public service in Dresden, he founded in 1740 the eponymous Ehrlichsches Gestift. The Ehrlich School and Poor Relief Foundation provided assistance until 1938. The foundation was expropriated in 1960 and restored in the 1990s. He died in Dresden, aged 66.
