= Ehrlichsches Gestift =

Charitable foundation in Dresden

The Ehrlichsche Gestift was a charitable foundation set up in Dresden by the merchant and councillor Johann Georg Ehrlich in 1740. Ehrlich donated part of his fortune in 1742. The Ehrlich School and Poor Relief Foundation provided assistance until 1938. The foundation was expropriated in 1960 and restored in the 1990s.
