= Oriental Orthodoxy in Germany =

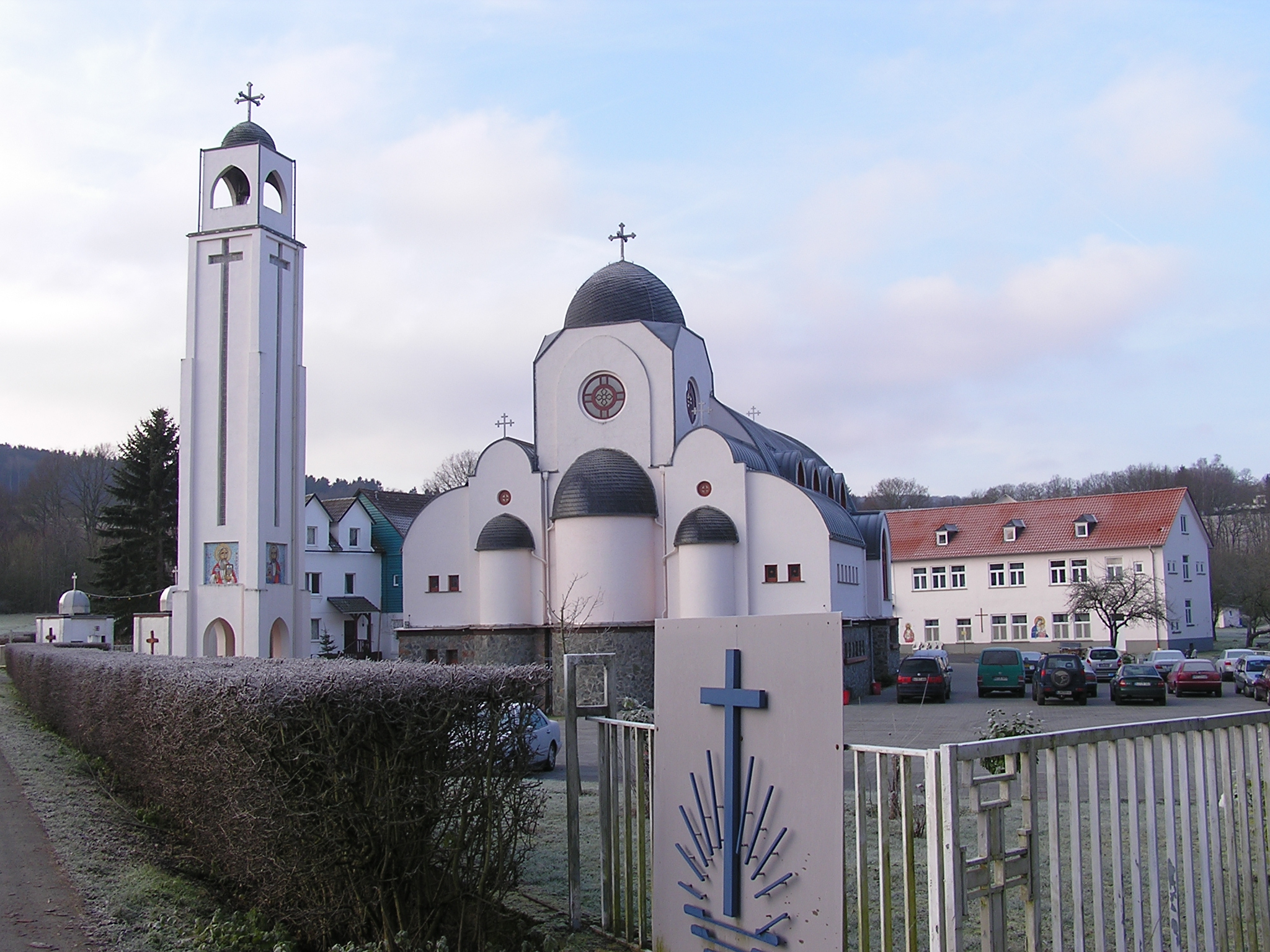
The Coptic Orthodox Monastery of St. Antonious in Waldsolms-Kröffelbach, Germany

Oriental Orthodoxy in Germany is part of the Oriental Orthodox Christian tradition. Before the beginning of the 20th century, the presence of Oriental Orthodox Christianity in Germany was minor, mainly represented by Armenian communities. It was gradually increasing in the second half of the century with immigration, mainly from the region of Middle East. Today, it is a growing community, well integrated into German society.

== Oriental Orthodox jurisdictions in Germany ==
- Armenian Apostolic Church
  - Armenian Orthodox Diocese of Cologne
- Coptic Orthodox Church
  - Coptic Orthodox Diocese of Höxter
- Ethiopian Orthodox Tewahedo Church
  - Ethiopian Orthodox Diocese of Cologne
- Syriac Orthodox Church
  - Syriac Orthodox Metropolis of Germany

== See also ==
- Christianity in Germany
- Coptic Orthodox Church in Europe
