= Jakobikirche, Dresden =

Church in Dresden, Germany

Coordinates: 51°03′12″N 13°43′28″E

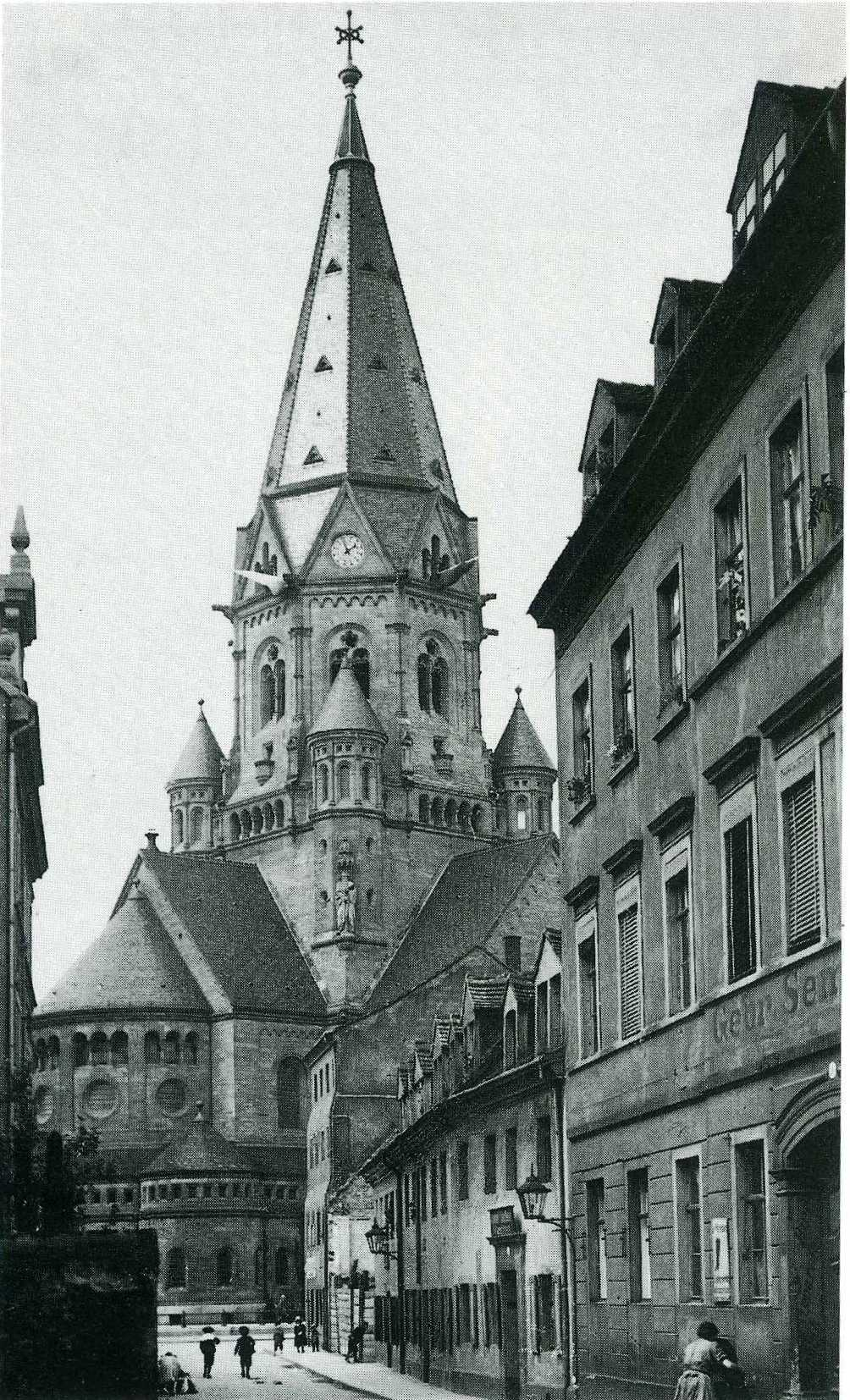
Dresden, Jakobikirche

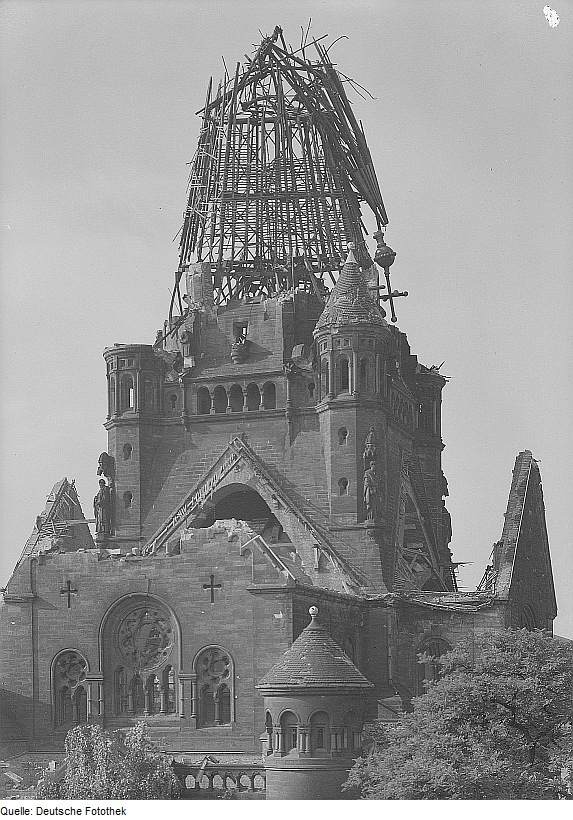
Jakobikirche in ruins

The Jakobikirche was a High Rhenish Neo-Romanesque church built in Dresden between 1898 and 1901 to plans by Jürgen Kröger. It was destroyed by bombing in the Second World War and its ruins were demolished in 1953.
