= Leuben =

Coordinates: 51°00′40″N 13°49′34″E

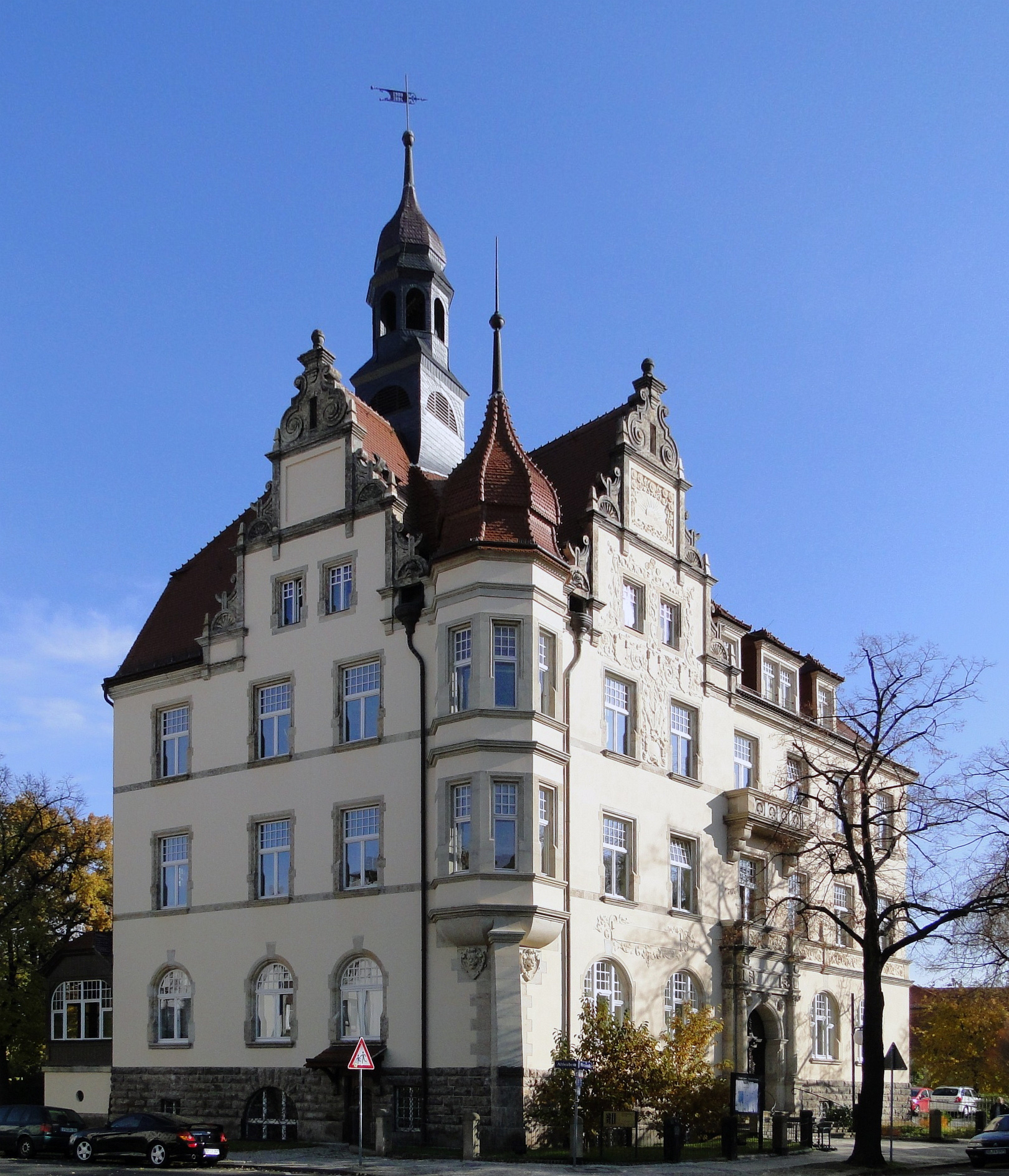
Rathaus Leuben 2010

Leuben (German pronunciation: [ˈlɔʏbn̩]) is a quarter and a borough (Stadtbezirk) of the German city of Dresden. The borough Leuben consists of the quarters Leuben, Laubegast, Kleinzschachwitz and Großzschachwitz. Its population is 38,353 (2020).
