= Predecessor Gothic church of the Frauenkirche, Dresden =

Former Gothic church in Dresden

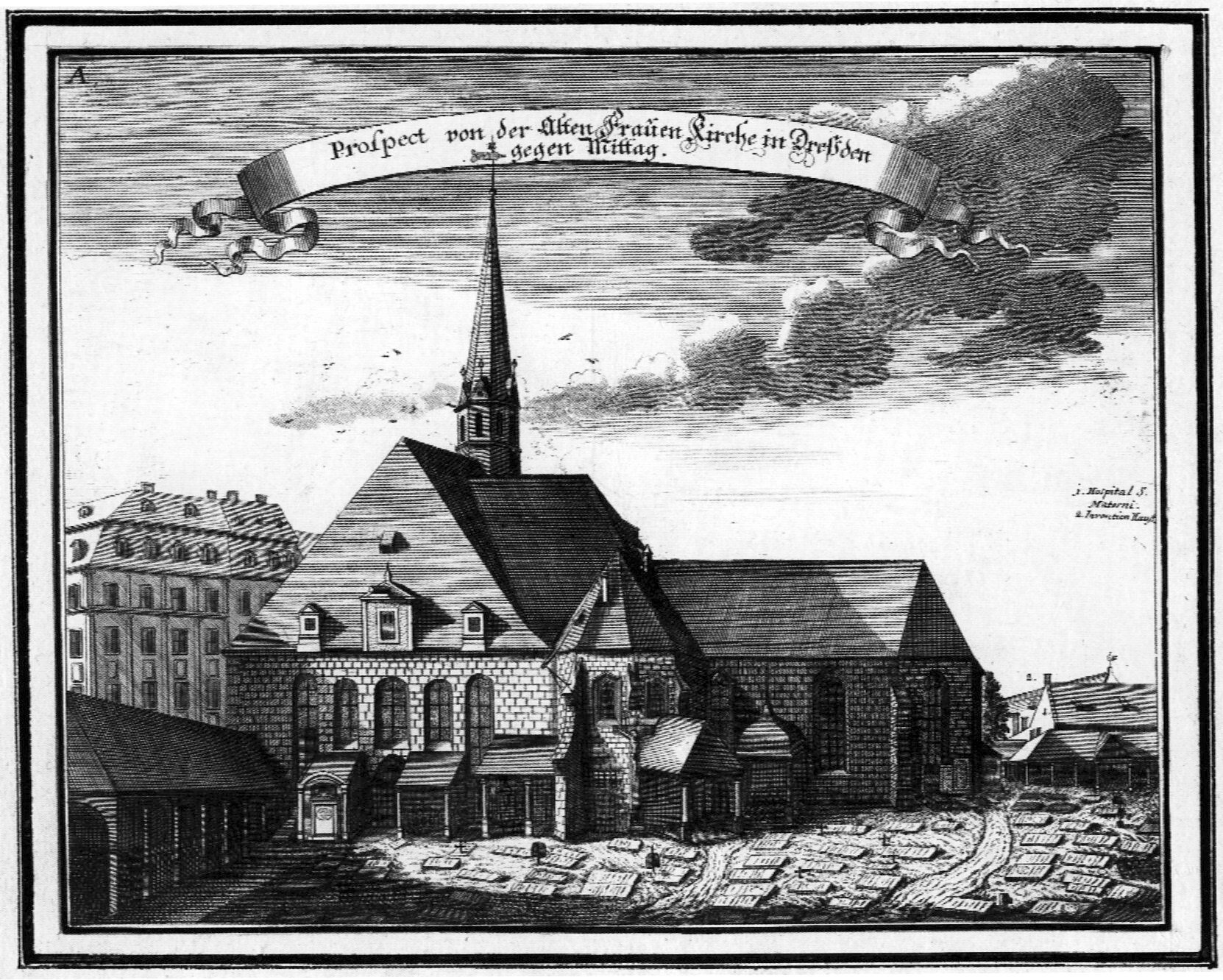
- South view of the predecessor Gothic church in 1714, engraving by Moritz Bodenehr
- Predecessor Gothic church of the Frauenkirche, Dresden
- Location: Dresden
- Denomination: Lutheran
- Previous denomination: Roman Catholic

Architecture
- Demolished: 1726

The Predecessor Gothic church of the Frauenkirche, Dresden was the predecessor building of the now‐famous baroque Frauenkirche designed by George Bähr. It was constructed in the 14th century and, despite its location outside the city walls, remained the mother and principal church of Dresden until the 16th century. The introduction of Protestantism in Saxony in 1539 marked a turning point in the church’s history; worship services were suspended there and held exclusively in the Kreuzkirche (Dresden). Only in 1559 were services resumed in the Frauenkirche, although by then it had been relegated to the status of a village church serving the poorer part of the population.

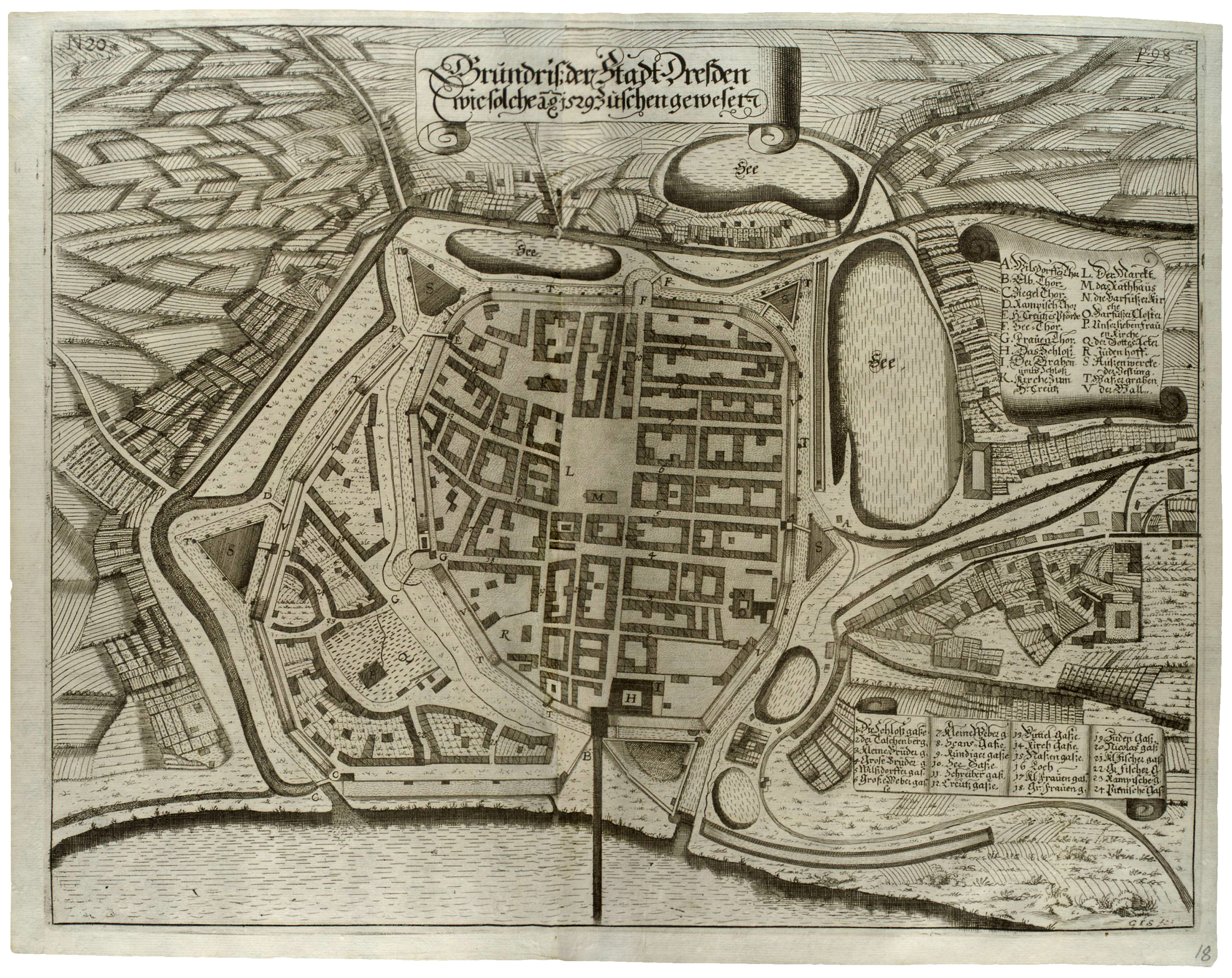
Map of the city of Dresden in 1529 by Anton Weck (1680; view from the Elbe bridge toward the city): Frauenkirche (P) and its churchyard (Q) are shown at lower left between the city wall and the outer works; the Kreuzkirche (K) lies above the market square (L) with the town hall (M).

Although the Frauenkirche and its churchyard held special significance as burial sites for the nobility and the higher bourgeoisie, protest arose among the populace when the dilapidated Frauenkirche was slated for demolition at the beginning of the 18th century and its churchyard secularised. Only once the church became imminently unsafe from collapse could planning for a new building under George Bähr proceed. The construction of the baroque Frauenkirche and the concurrent use of the Gothic church initially ran in parallel, before the old Frauenkirche had to be demolished in 1727 in order not to impede progress on the new building.

Various fittings from the Gothic Frauenkirche survived, including liturgical vessels and the pulpit. One bell from the Gothic Frauenkirche still rings in the rebuilt Bähr church. In that new church, as well as in the Kreuzkirche and the city museum, tombstones and epitaphs from the Frauenkirche and its churchyard are exhibited.

== History ==
=== Early history ===
In 968 the Diocese of Meissen was founded, subordinate to the Archdiocese of Magdeburg. From Meissen the missionizing of the Sorbian population then living in the Saxon region commenced. To this end, by around the year 1000 a church organisation with numerous mission churches developed, largely at the initiative of the bishops but also of the margraves. It is considered probable that a Meissen bishop founded the Frauenkirche in the former Gau Nisan and held the patronage over it. Initially around 30 Sorbian villages on both sides of the Elbe, up to ten kilometres from the church, were assigned to the Frauenkirche parish. The Sorbian village of Poppitz also provided the Frauenkirche, from its foundation, a dower (Dos) for its material endowment.

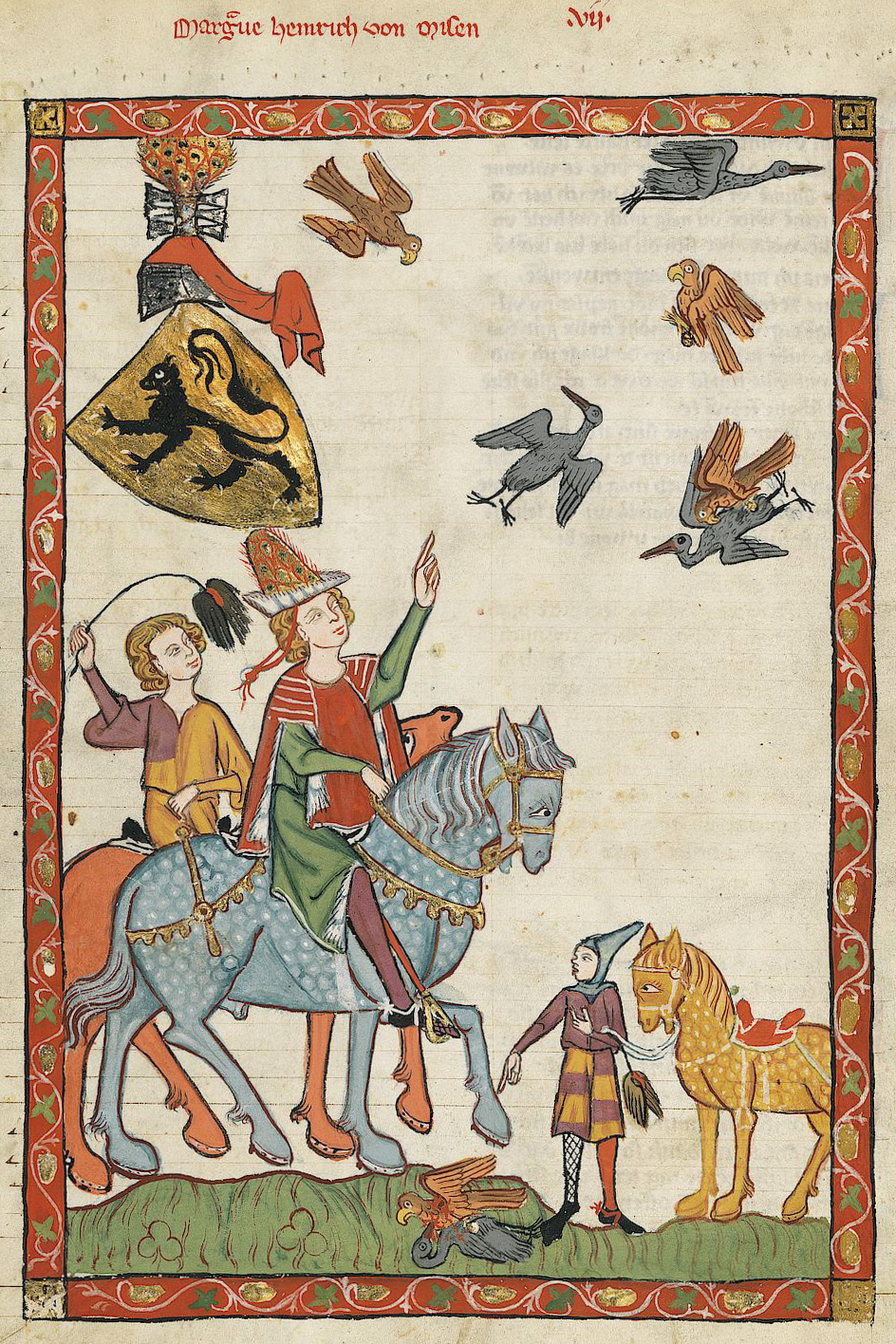
Patron of the Frauenkirche until shortly before 1288: Margrave Heinrich III., Margrave of Meissen, illustration in the Codex Manesse.

The Frauenkirche was dedicated to “Our Lady” (Unserer Lieben Frauen) in honour of the Virgin Mary. As many churches in the Middle Ages bore the Marian dedication, this gives no precise indication of founding date. Research suggests that the first Frauenkirche began as a “mission station without a fixed district” and stood outside a burgward centre. This first church must have been built by the late 10th or early 11th century. During the refurbishment of the roof about 1580 an old year-number (probably 1020) was found and the age given as “in the 560th year”. Thus chronicle authors of the 17th and 18th centuries considered a foundation around 1020 plausible. According to Slavic tradition the (probably wooden) Frauenkirche was consecrated by Přibislav (likely the court chaplain of the Bohemian duke Oldřich) on 8 September, the feast day of the Nativity of Mary. Archaeologist Reinhard Spehr dated construction to “around 1060”; his 1987 excavations on the former churchyard uncovered burial remains likely from the 11th/early 12th century. Later excavations yielded finds that even date back to the late 10th century. As no structural remains of the first Frauenkirche exist and stone construction was still uncommon at the time, the first building likely was of wood.

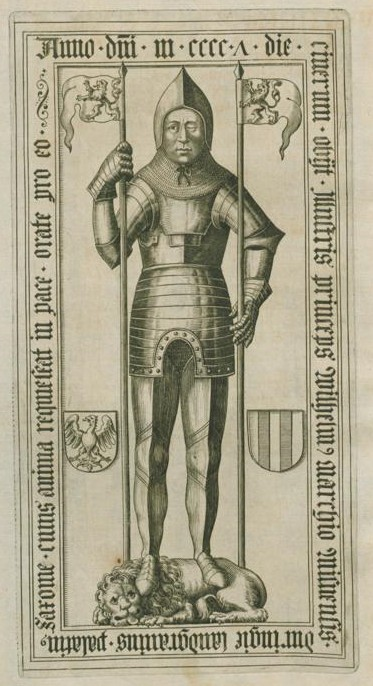
Margrave Wilhelm I., Margrave of Meissen, patron of the Frauenkirche from 1404, engraving 1692

In the course of the 12th century, the church’s wealth and significance increased and the surrounding settlements must have grown such that a plan for a stone building was realised. In 1987 excavated wall-foundations comprised Planer-schiefer (Pläner slate) set in clay. Foundations of purely Planer-schiefer found in Dresden beneath the city wall date to the last quarter of the 12th century. Small fragmentatory finds in the clay of the Planer walls, broadly datable to the 12th century, suggest that a first stone Frauenkirche existed before 1170. It is thought to have been built as a three-aisled basilica.

The first indirect documented mention dates to 1240: Margrave Heinrich III. named the parish priest of Dresden in his charter for the Leipzig Katharinenkirche as a witness. The first direct written reference to the Frauenkirche dates from 1 October 1289 when Abbot Heydolf of the Monastery Berge near Magdeburg informed the archdeacon Arnold of Nisan that he had “appointed the priest Albert of Lobeda … as pastor in the [Frauen]church in Dresden and imposed a ban on his adversary Adolf in that church.”

The patronage over the Frauenkirche changed several times up to the 15th century. Until shortly before 1288 it belonged to Margrave Heinrich III.; it then passed to the Clarissan convent of Seußlitz and in 1316, by exchange, to Bishop Withego II. of Meissen. In 1404 the Margrave of Meissen Wilhelm I. acquired patronage rights from Bishop Thimo of Colditz in exchange for the church‐fief Ebersbach and the Nikolaikirche in Freiberg.

=== Construction in the 14th and 15th centuries ===
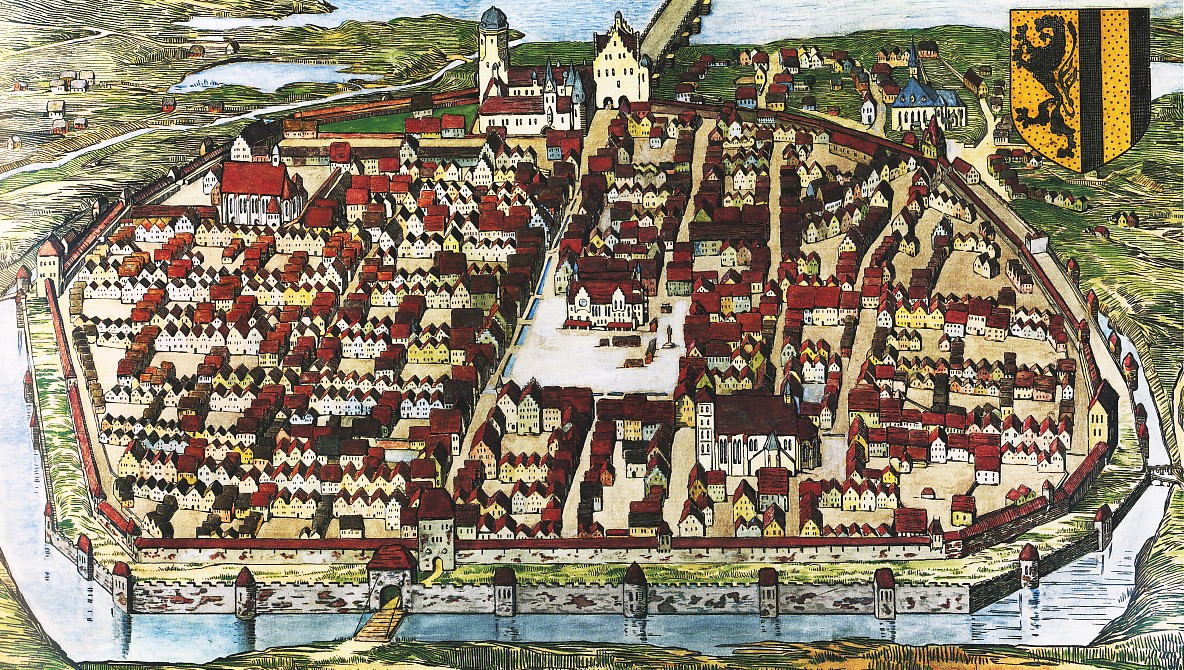
The old Frauenkirche north-east outside the city walls in 1521: view after the wooden model by Max Stam

The rebuild of the Frauenkirche took place in the 14th century. It was “built around the Romanesque predecessor, thus encircling it like a bell”. Whether the church consecration recorded in 1388 refers to the new build is uncertain but not unlikely, as excavation evidence points to a late 14th-century structure. The new build was a flat-roofed hall church with two aisles. The plan shape of this nave was almost square, similar to its predecessor. In 1395 the church received a donated altar, and minor modifications are recorded in 1452.

The date when the sacristy was added is unknown. In 1468 stonemason Paul created a window and a keystone for the sacristy; it was given a new door and likely vaulted in 1469. Although not clearly proven, art-historian Heinrich Magirius sees these works as “in connection with the building of a sacristy”.

From 1470 to 1483 the Frauenkirche was redesigned in the late Gothic style. Between 1470 and 1472 the church and its sacristy received new roofs; at that time the church already had a small tower. From 1477 to 1483 a long choir was added, giving the church a total length of 38 metres. The choir, soon called “the high choir”, was vaulted. Cornelius Gurlitt and Heinrich Magirius suspected this late Gothic choir replaced an earlier one, though no direct evidence of a predecessor choir survives. The period of the choir’s construction likely also saw the addition of a side-chapel and possibly the rebuilding of the sacristy. On 6 November 1483 the main altar in the newly completed long choir was consecrated.

In 1497 the Frauenkirche received a new ridge turret crafted by Caspar Beyer. Two years later a new spindle on a golden sphere was placed atop the tower. At this point the Frauenkirche had acquired its iconographic appearance, as seen in 18th-century prints, offering the impression “of a centralising building with east-attached long choir”.

=== The 16th and 17th centuries ===
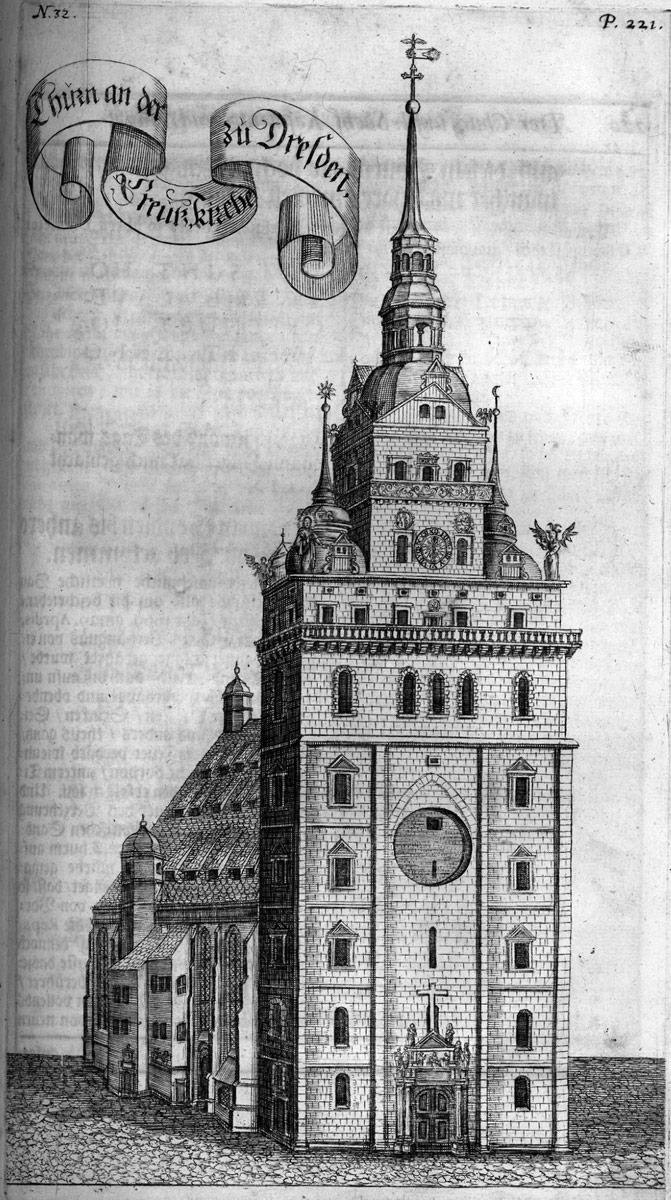
The Kreuzkirche (which replaced the Frauenkirche as main church after the Reformation) – engraving by Anton Weck, 1680

In 1539 the anti-Lutheran Saxon Duke George the Bearded died. His successor, the Lutheran-leaning Heinrich IV, Duke of Saxony, introduced Protestantism in Saxony that same year. This marked a decisive moment for the Frauenkirche. Although the Nikolaikirche had already been built nearby in the 12th century (and re-consecrated as the Kreuzkirche in 1388), over time the Kreuzkirche evolved into a rival for the status of main church of Dresden. It was inside the city walls, while the Frauenkirche lay beyond them. Nevertheless, the Frauenkirche retained its status as mother and main church until the 16th century. With the Reformation of 1539 that changed. Worship at the Frauenkirche was suspended, and services were held exclusively in the Kreuzkirche. It appears the Dresden city council assumed services could take place in a city church alone, despite the fact that 26 surrounding villages were parished to the Frauenkirche. The church’s furnishings were sold off; the Annaberg mint and later the Dresden mint acquired its altars, and its bells were melted down. The church remained empty for some time, though it continued to serve as a burial site.

Already by 1520, under the rule of George the Bearded, fortification works around the settlement at the Frauenkirche site had begun. The old city wall remained, but from 1546 the construction of the Dresden fortifications commenced under Caspar Vogt von Wierandt. Completed in 1556, these works visually incorporated the Frauenkirche into the city. The Neumarkt quarter to the city-side of the church developed into a lively construction zone. Nearby the Frauenkirche and its churchyard, the mint (1556), the armament house with foundry and salt-house (1559–1563) and the Powder Tower (1565) were built.

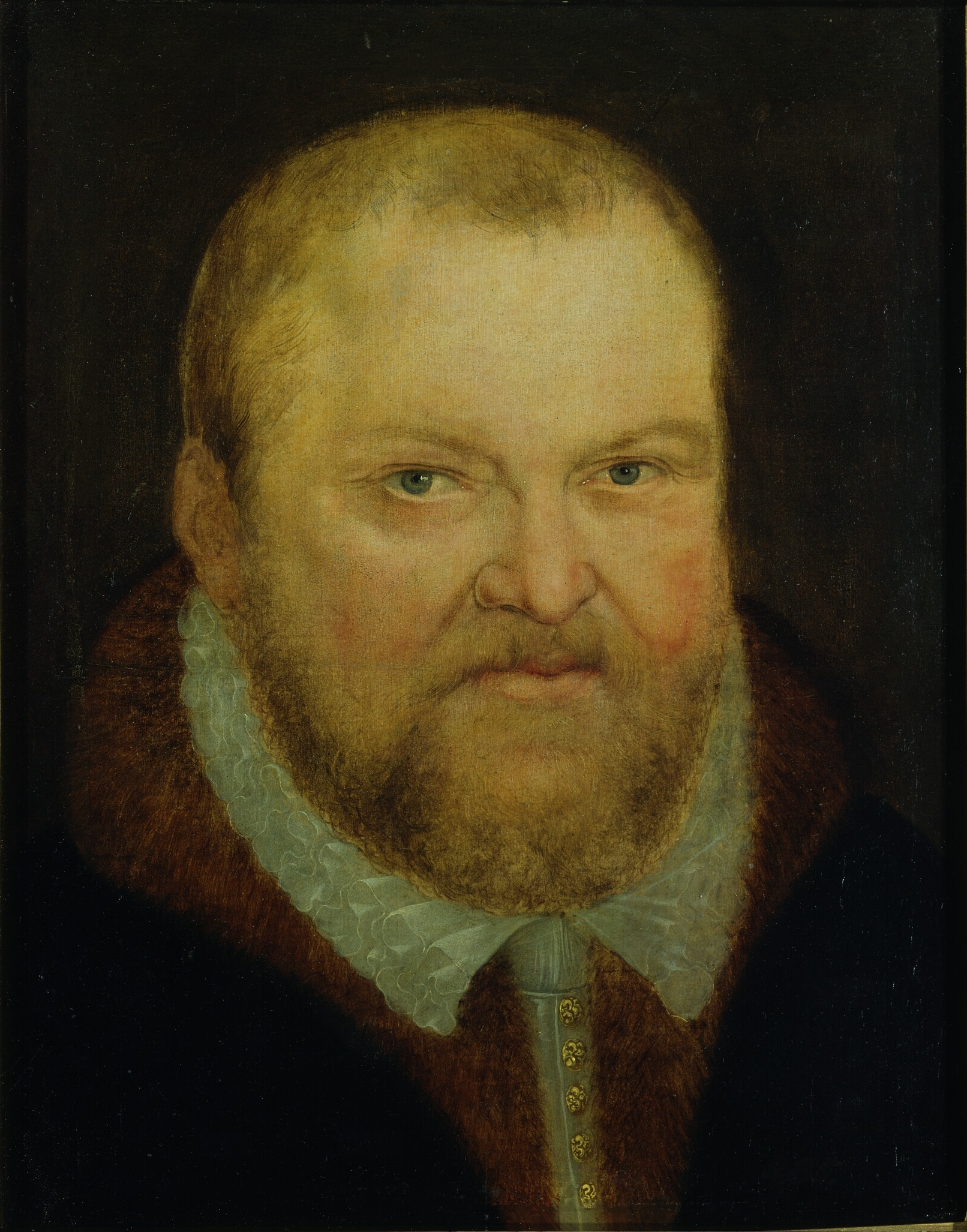
Elector August of Saxony (painting c.1550 by Lucas Cranach the Younger) presented new bells to the Frauenkirche in 1556

By the 1550s it had become apparent that the Kreuzkirche alone could no longer accommodate services for both the city population and the 26 parished villages. The city council therefore resolved to reopen the Frauenkirche for worship. Because of its disuse since 1539, it had fallen further into disrepair and required refurbishment from 1556: the nave ceiling was removed in 1556 and replaced the following year with a frail ceiling which soon received a painted decoration. The new two-storey galleries in the nave were painted ash-white; the interior walls were whitewashed, and the seating renewed. Sculptor Hans Walther II made a new pulpit in 1556-57, regarded as a “masterpiece of the Renaissance”. Elector August gave the church three bells from the secularised Cistercian monastery Altzella in 1556. In 1559 the church received a new Steer organ and was reopened for services on Judica Sunday in the same year.

The Frauenkirche served as the parish church for 26 villages incorporated into Dresden’s parish jurisdiction. Baptisms, however, were only permitted in the Kreuzkirche, which since the Reformation had become Dresden’s main church. Funerals took place in the Frauenkirche and on the Frauenkirchhof. The latter had become a prestigious burial ground for bourgeoisie and nobility after the completion of 112 exclusive hereditary burial niches (Schwibbögen) around 1565.

=== Decay and demolition up to 1727 ===
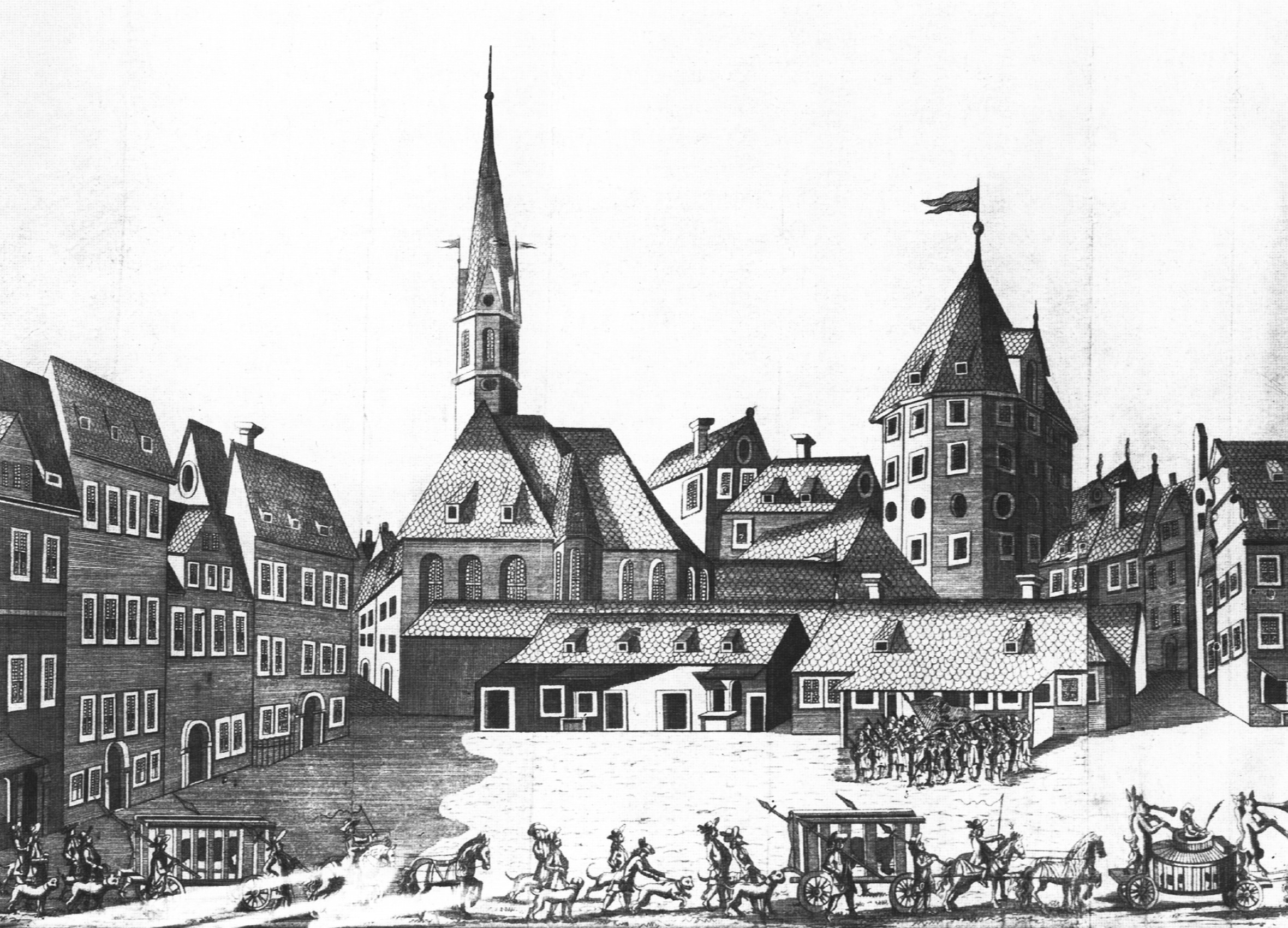
The Frauenkirche (left) in 1678 next to the Powder Tower (right), view from the Neumarkt; from a copper engraving by Gabriel Tzschimmer

By the 16th century the quarter around the Frauenkirche had been upgraded by the presence of the Stallhof and the Gewandhaus. The Neumarkt district, at the beginning of the 18th century, gained further importance through the aristocratic building boom — Hôtel de Saxe (1709), Palais Brühl (1712), Palais Flemming-Sulkowski (1714) — yet the Frauenkirche itself had remained externally unchanged since the 15th century; the decay of the medieval structure could no longer be halted by the 17th century. From 1714 Elector Frederick August I pressured the secularisation of the Frauenkirchhof and the erection of a new representative church in place of the aged building. Both the Oberkonsistorium and Dresden’s citizens resisted the dissolution of the churchyard, where generations of families had interred their dead. On the elector’s orders the churchyard was closed in 1715 and partly cleared to allow for a new regiment house.

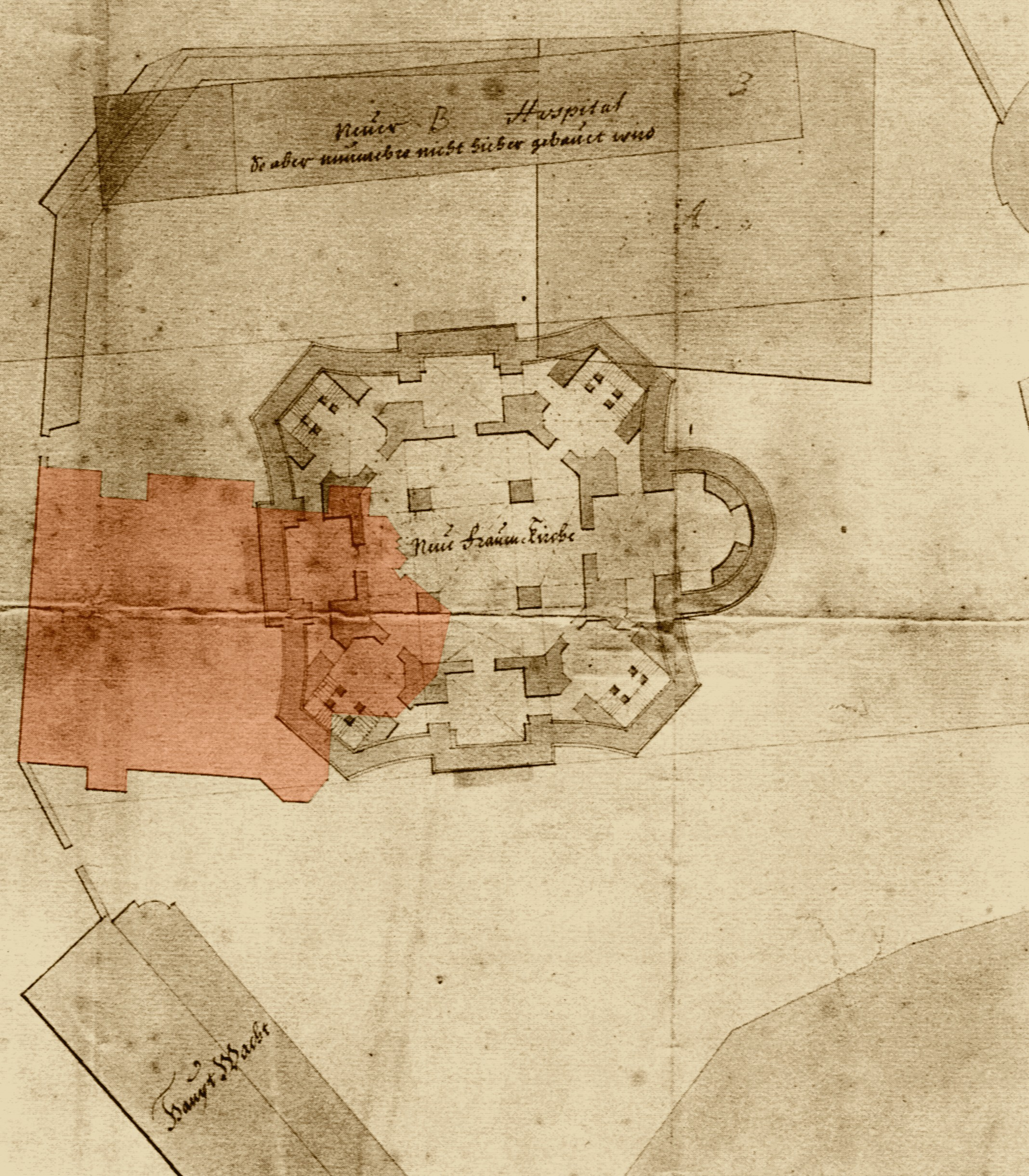
Site-plan of the new Frauenkirche superimposed on the old church’s ground-plan (highlighted red), north-east the Maternihospital, south the new Hauptwache; project drawing by George Bähr, c.1725

By no later than 1722 the city council of Dresden began planning a church rebuild. In 1721 the large bell of the Frauenkirche lost its clapper and damaged the church roof. Further cracks developed in the masonry, and by 1722 the ribs of the choir vault and the roof turret had to be removed. The bells were hung in a newly erected interim bell-tower north of the church.

Before the new building could be constructed the burial ground had to be cleared; the Frauenkirchhof was overburdened with graves and there were over 100 massive hereditary burials (Schwibbögen) in the church and churchyard wall. In July 1724 labourers began removing tombstones and breaking down the Schwibbögen; these works continued until 1727. The Oberkonsistorium ordered that citizens arrange new burials for their deceased; where this was not possible, the town council ensured re-burial at the Johannis cemetery.

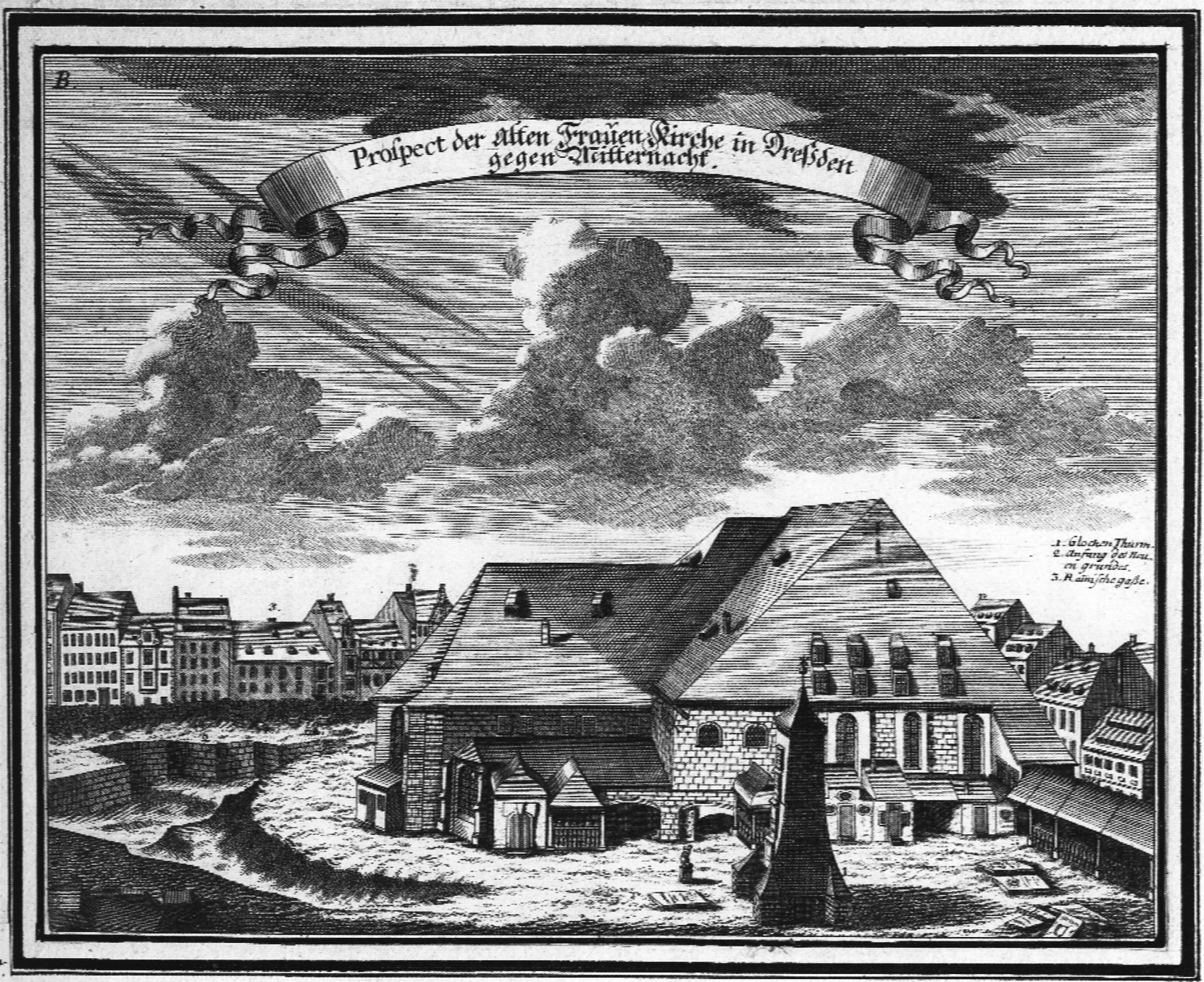
The old Frauenkirche already without its ridge turret, on the left the excavation pit for the new Frauenkirche; engraving by Moritz Bodenehr (1728)

In January 1725 the still-used Frauenkirche was at risk of collapse. The masonry cracks increased from 1721. By May 1725 scaffolding and timber props had been erected internally; at the same time the exterior walls were reinforced with supports (despite adjacent resident protests). From 1725 the churchyard was used as storage for materials for the new church.

Excavation works for the new Frauenkirche commenced between the Maternihospital and the old church’s long choir, allowing the old church to remain in service. The official start-date was 3 July 1726; the foundation-stone was laid on 26 August 1726 in a service held in the old Frauenkirche. By the end of 1726 the new building had progressed to the point that the old church hindered further construction. The building secretary Oderich, master-builder Johann Gottfried Fehre and George Bähr reported to the city council that demolition must begin because “all foundation lines [of the new build] pass through the nave and main walls of the old church”. On 14 December 1726 the Dresden city council petitioned Elector Frederick August I that the old church should be demolished by spring 1727 to avoid hindering the new build; with his approval the elector directed that worship be transferred to the Sophienkirche (Dresden).

On 9 February 1727 the last service in the old Frauenkirche was held. On 15 February 1727 official demolition began. The organ and pews were removed and the main altar brought to the Annenkirche (Dresden). At that time there remained so many funerary monuments on the outer wall of the church that the transport accounts of February 1727 record “30 loads of epitaphia from the church to the Wilsdruffer Gate”. By the end of April 1727 the church had been roof-stripped and dismantled. Only the west wall and its immediately adjacent churchyard wall remained — “probably as boundary and protection of the building site”. These were finally removed in August — the demolition of the old Frauenkirche was thereby complete down to the foundations.

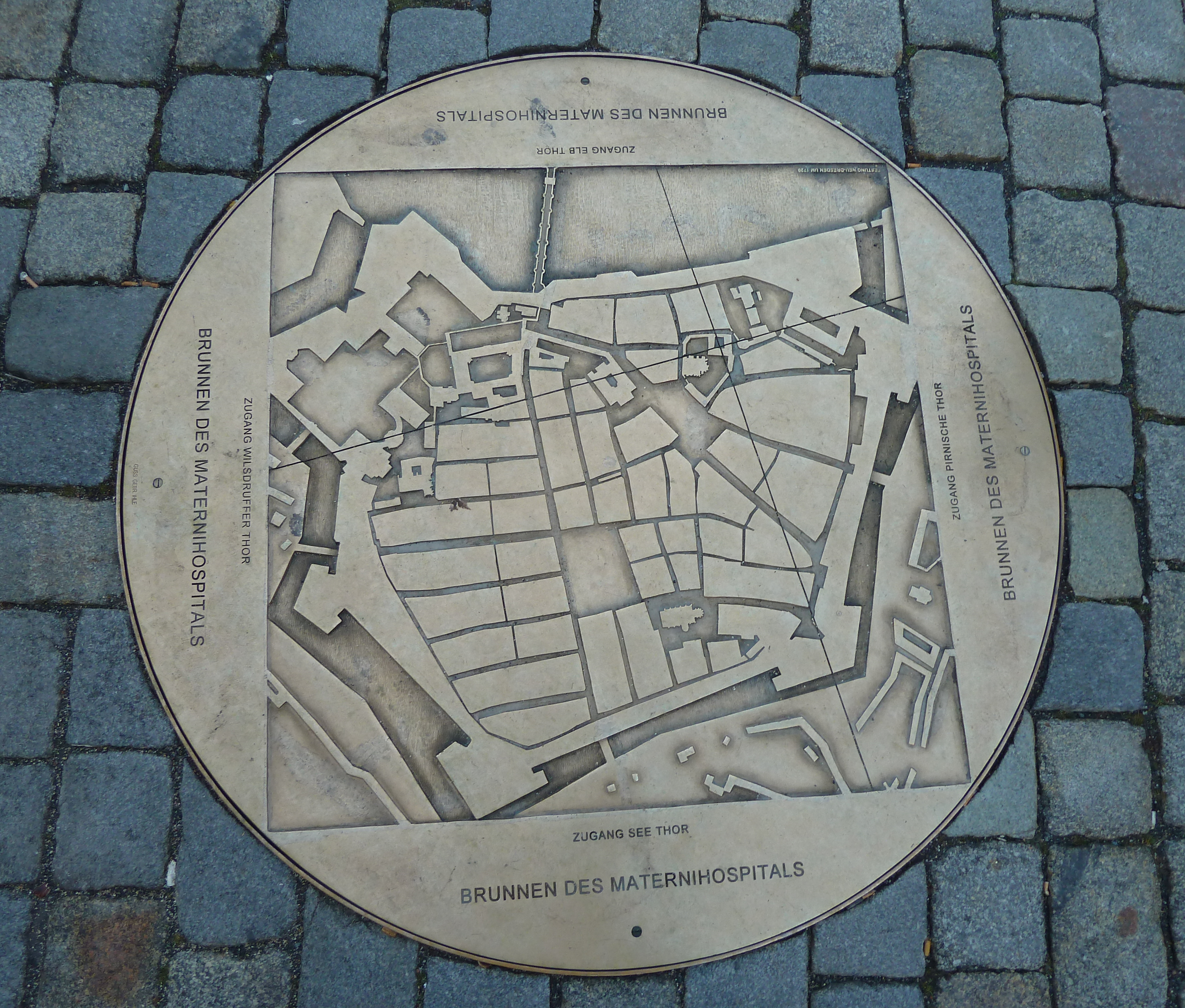
Bronze plaque marking the location of the Maternihospital well at the Dresden Neumarkt: the intersection of the two lines indicates the old Frauenkirche’s site, directly south-west of it.

The present-day Frauenkirche occupies the choir of the old Frauenkirche. The old church's nave is not built over. A bronze plate set into the paving marks the well of the Maternihospital and, together with the present church building, helps to indicate where the old church

once stood.

== Architectural description ==
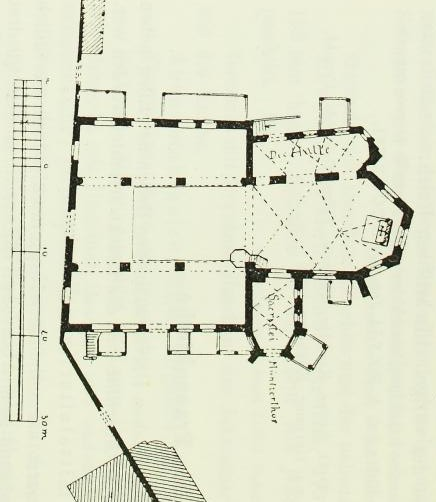
Ground plan of the Frauenkirche around 1700; reconstruction by Cornelius Gurlitt

The nave of the old Frauenkirche, with an external width of 25.40 metres and a length of 23 metres, was larger than its Romanesque predecessor. Surviving ground plans show that the enclosing walls of the nave were not parallel but were offset from one another.

A long choir later adjoined the nave; it matched the width of the central nave and closed on three sides of an octagon. North of the choir there was a side chapel that likewise ended polygonally; south of the choir, adjoining the aisle of the nave, there was a two-storey annex with a polygonal termination that served as the sacristy.

The church roofs were unusual: the ridge of the high hipped roof over the nave did not run west–east as was customary for medieval churches but south–north. The ridge beams of the choir and sacristy roofs were lower than that of the nave; the gable roof of the choir did not join the nave's hip but a cross-hipped roof lower than the nave's yet clearly higher than those of the ancillary buildings. It is assumed that the roof turret (roof ridge turret) sat centrally on the ridge of the nave roof, which implies the "additional roof" was set further south — neither directly aligned with the choir axis nor directly aligned with the southern aisle. Magirius suspected that the roof covered part of the sacristy annex or the long choir but nonetheless described the repeatedly transmitted depiction of the roof as "peculiar" and "strange".

=== The nave ===
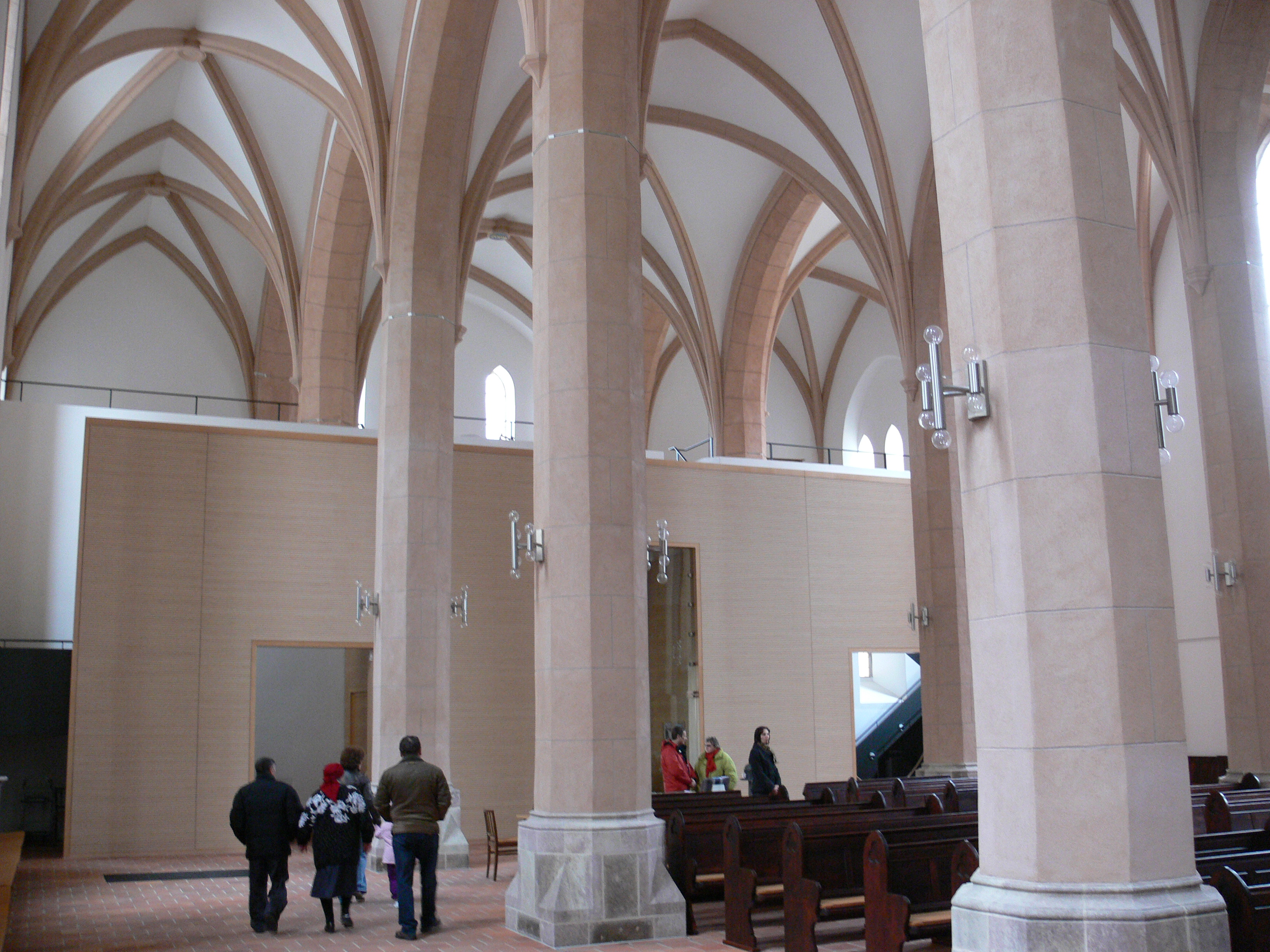
Possible pier structure of the Frauenkirche: square base with octagonal pier; St. Jakobi Church, Chemnitz

Cornelius Gurlitt still wrote in 1902 that the nave was "probably of Romanesque origin"; however, excavations in 1987 showed that the church was built in the 14th century around the foundations of the Romanesque predecessor.

The interior of the three-aisled nave measured 23 metres across and 20 metres in length. Each side aisle was separated from the central nave by three arcades resting on two pillars; at the western and eastern ends the arcades rested on wall imposts. The piers are depicted as rectangular in surviving plans, but a half-worked piece of an octagonal pier survives, suggesting the plans may only show the plinth form. Such pier designs are attested in Saxony around 1400 — for example at the St. Jakobi Church in Chemnitz and the Frauenkirche in Meissen.

The nave interior was not vaulted; because there were no flying buttresses a vault seems not to have been planned. Instead, in 1557 the nave received a painted coffered ceiling with openings through which worshippers could follow services from the attic when the church was overcrowded.

The south side of the nave had five basket arch windows, which Magirius judged to be post-medieval. The north side contained three stylistically similar windows. The nave was entered by three portals: a pointed-arch portal from the churchyard on the south side, another on the north side, and a third from the western street.

A stair tower adjoined the northwest of the hall church. Very little is known about the side chapel that adjoined the north aisle on the east, since pictorial depictions of the north side and the surviving ground plans contradict each other. Magirius suggested that the side chapel "was hardly older than the late-Gothic long choir."

=== The long choir ===
East of the hall church was a late-Gothic choir matching the width of the central nave. An inscription on the choir indicates that construction began in 1477 and was completed in 1483. The choir was vaulted and painted before 1596. It measured 15 metres in length, giving the church a total length of about 38 metres.

Gurlitt speculated that the new choir replaced an older chancel. Magirius pointed to the unusual additional roof between the main roof and the choir roof as an indicator that the long choir may have been added to a previously shorter choir. Construction accounts show the roof truss existed as early as 1472, making an older chancel plausible.

The long choir had three lancet pointed-arch windows. It was entered from the churchyard by a small pointed-arch portal on the south side; further west on that side was the entrance to the sacristy. At that spot stood the pulpit, which could be reached directly from the sacristy via a staircase. The church's main altar was placed in the long choir.

Various stone elements of the late-Gothic choir were reused in George Bähr's later reconstruction and were recovered during the clearance of the Frauenkirche ruins in 1993.

=== The sacristy annex ===
The sacristy annex lay on the east side of the southern aisle and the south side of the choir. It had two storeys. Burials were located in the ground floor, and church vestments were stored there; the first floor was used by burial societies and guilds to store shrouds and equipment.

Records show the sacristy received a new door in 1468. It is uncertain whether the so-called "Münzer Gate" referred to the sacristy door or to the large south portal of the nave, which Michaelis described as the great gate of the south side. The Münzer Gate had been donated by the elector's minting guild, bore its coat of arms, and the guild had a burial plot at the sacristy and donated a life-size stone crucifix mounted on a sacristy pillar. Three fragments of the torso of the Christ figure were found during the 1994 clearance of the Frauenkirche ruins.

In 1468, a stonemason named Paul produced a new window and a keystone for the sacristy. The following year a master Thomas vaulted it, and in 1470 master Claus executed larger vaults, probably for the sacristy.

A master Claus who worked for the bishops of Meissen on the Albrechtsburg in the 1480s–1490s may be identical with the Claus active at the Frauenkirche; Magirius found this identification "tempting". The upper-floor windows of the annex had ogee arch (curtain-arch) forms and the buttresses had scrolled caps; Magirius saw stylistic elements "revealing an origin in the circle of Arnold von Westfalen's Albrechtsburg, a building that had been under construction since 1471." This would place the sacristy no earlier than 1471. Magirius therefore assumed the sacristy recorded in 1460s sources was an earlier, more modest structure, and dated the successor building to "around 1500", thus later than the long choir.

In 1703 the sacristy was renewed: the windows enlarged and a new door opened toward the churchyard "for the better convenience of the clergy."

== Furnishings ==
=== Altars ===
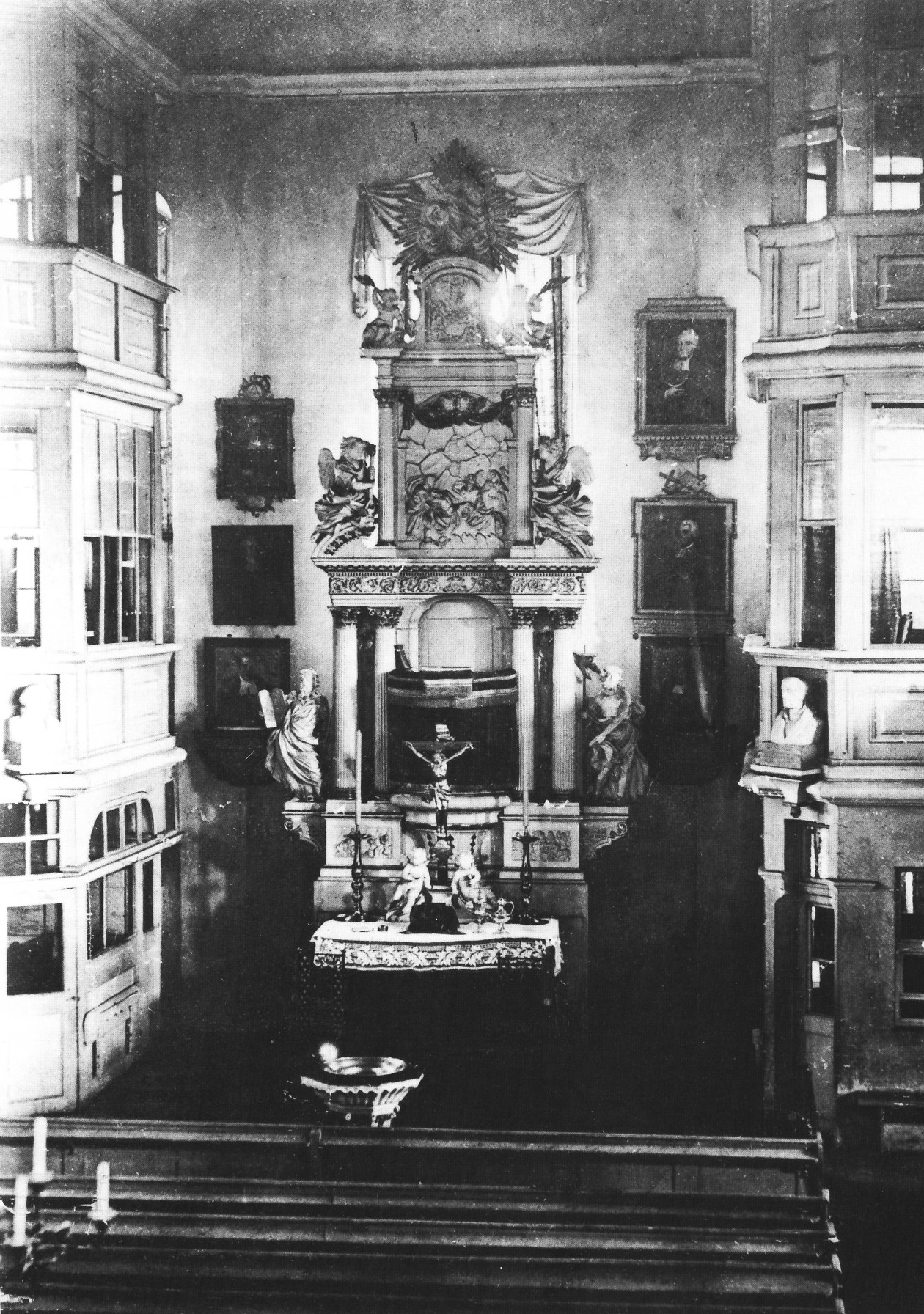
The altered main altar of the Frauenkirche in the Matthäuskirche; photograph before 1882

In 1366 Hans Münzmeister donated a Michaelis altar to the church, which was rededicated in 1395 and 1459. A Trinity altar is recorded for 1394. In 1395 Margrave Wilhelm I of Meissen endowed an altar dedicated to the apostles Philip and James "and all twelve messengers", and at that time the Frauenkirche had seven altars, including one in the chapel of the "ossuary" on the Frauenkirche churchyard. A new main altar dated from 1483, and its consecration took place on 6 November 1483 by the auxiliary bishop Andreas of Cerigo. A further altar consecrated by Andreas of Cerigo is recorded in 1489 and may have stood in a side chapel.

The last main altar of the church was donated in 1584 by the brothers Heinrich and Adolf von Krosigk as a memorial for their brother Hans Georg, who had died in 1581. The altar was carved from white Pirna sandstone and bore, alongside the memorial inscription, the statement: "Mit göttlicher Gnade anno 1584 an unsers Herrn Christ Himmelfarth ist dieser Altar durch mich Christoph Walther von Breslaw, Bildhauer und Borger allhier, verfertiget worden, seines Alters 50 Jahr." (With divine grace in the year 1584 on the Ascension of our Lord this altar was made by me Christoph Walther of Breslau, sculptor and citizen here, aged 50.)

The lower register of the altar displayed a Communion scene, lateral reliefs of the Nativity and the Resurrection, above them a Crucifixion, followed by a depiction of the Last Judgment. The altar was crowned with a representation of the Holy Spirit as a dove flanked by angels, and the images were accompanied by biblical inscriptions. Michaelis (1714) noted: "

Dieses alles ist sauber und künstlich ausgehauen / wie denn auch die Schrifft und Sprüche daran erhaben gehauen sind

" (All of this is neatly and artfully carved, as are the raised inscriptions and sayings on it).

When the old Frauenkirche was demolished in 1727 the altar was transferred that same year to the Annenkirche. Around that time the main altar painting was probably replaced by a pulpit and baroque figures and reliefs were added. After the Annenkirche burned in 1760 the altar no longer appears in the Annenkirche records; at some later point it was moved to the Matthäuskirche in the Friedrichstadt, but only partially preserved: from the original Frauenkirche altar survived columns, consoles, the cornice of the upper storey and the broken main cornice with lion heads and foliage in the frieze. The altar had a newly added aureole that made it about 820 centimetres high; the original altar height is recorded as 734 centimetres. The altar was again altered in 1882.

During the bombing of Dresden in February 1945 the Matthäuskirche was heavily damaged. The damaged altar was ultimately removed in the post-war period.

=== Pulpit ===
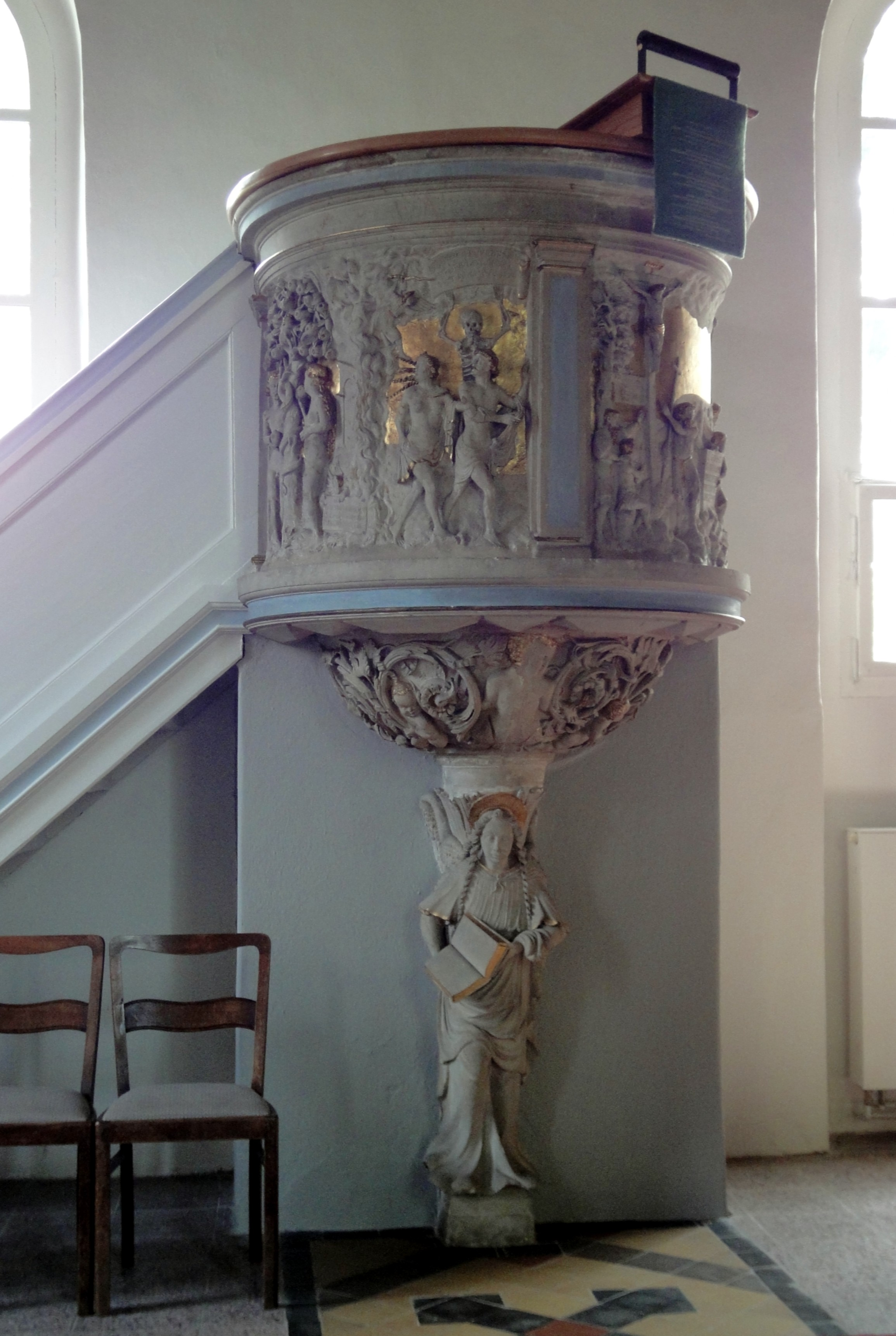
The pulpit of the Kreuzkirche, Bischofswerda

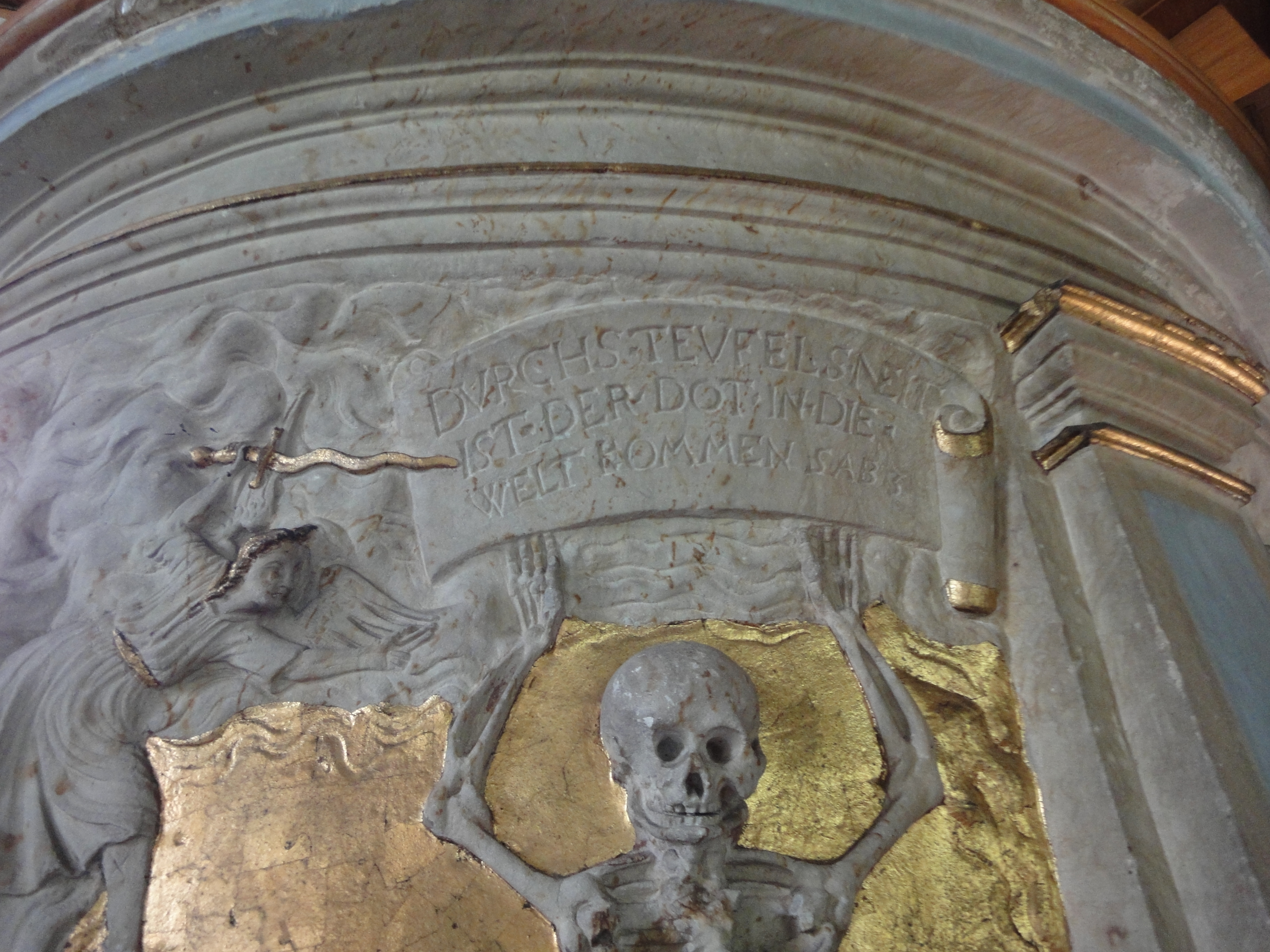
Detail of the pulpit matching Michaelis's description: "the Death, behind them the angel with the naked swinging sword, accompanied by: Through the devil's envy death came into the world, Sap. 2"

In 1556–1557 Hans Walther II carved the Frauenkirche pulpit, which was painted by Augustus Cordus. The wooden sounding board (canopy) had already been lost by 1714. At that time Michaelis wrote that the pulpit's canopy had been of stone but had been "replaced by a new wooden canopy and sculptural work, on top of which the image of the sun and other decorations are to be seen; below on that canopy the Holy Spirit in the form of a dove, also painted white and gold."

The pulpit stood on the southern triumphal-arch impost between the nave and choir and could be reached from the sacristy by a stone staircase. Above the pulpit entrance hung a life-size alabaster crucifix.

A 1714 description of the Frauenkirche pulpit is preserved (translation):

Hereupon also presents itself the pulpit built of white Pirna stone, with beautiful carved and painted Biblical histories. First, the Tree of Knowledge, around which the serpent is wound, accompanied on a small panel with: God created man for eternal life; further Adam and Eve, between them Death, behind them the angel with the naked swinging sword, accompanied by: Through the devil's envy death came into the world, Sap. 2. Then / Christ on the cross, on one side the Baptism of Christ in the Jordan, with the inscription: This is my beloved Son etc.; on the other John pointing to Christ: Behold, this is the Lamb of God etc. The whole work rests upon a statue of an angel carved from solid stone who holds in his right hand a tablet on which one reads: Blessed are they who hear and keep the word of God.

— Johann Gottfried Michaelis, 1714

The art historian Walter Hentschel, who studied the Walther family of sculptors extensively, concluded in 1966 that the pulpit of the Kreuzkirche in Bischofswerda is "very probably identical with the pulpit carved by Hans Walther in 1556 for the old Dresden Frauenkirche," and elsewhere stated that "there is little doubt" about the identity of the two pulpits. Magirius agreed in 2002 and called the identity "very likely." Gurlitt noted stylistic similarities between the pulpit and works by Hans Walther.

The Frauenkirche pulpit was removed in 1727 during the demolition and stored in one of the Schwibbögen of the old Annenkirchhof. The Bischofswerda pulpit arrived in that town in 1814 from the Schlosskapelle Stolpen. A transfer from the Frauenkirche pulpit to the Schlosskapelle Stolpen is not documented but possible.

Gurlitt argued that the Bischofswerda pulpit "belongs to the expansion of Stolpen Castle under Elector Augustus." Hentschel dated the Bischofswerda pulpit to the mid-16th century; unlike Gurlitt, however, Hentschel considered it "unlikely that such a stately pulpit stood in the not very large château chapel, whose wealthy plastic decoration would not have suited the frugal tastes of Elector Augustus."

Three discrepancies exist between Michaelis's 1714 description and the Bischofswerda pulpit: the Bischofswerda pulpit bears on its right edge a relief of the Resurrection of Christ that Michaelis does not mention (Hentschel suggested this may have been obscured in the Frauenkirche by an adjacent council gallery); the Bischofswerda pulpit lacks the Baptism of Christ described by Michaelis; and the angel supporting the Bischofswerda pulpit carries an open book rather than the tablet Michaelis described. It is possible the pulpit was altered in later times. Because it is recorded that Elector Augustus donated a pulpit to the Stolpen castle chapel in 1567, an identity of the Bischofswerda pulpit with the Stolpen pulpit cannot be excluded; at minimum the Bischofswerda pulpit could be a close copy of the Frauenkirche pulpit.

Gurlitt wrote that the Bischofswerda pulpit “belongs to the expansion of Stolpen Castle under Elector Augustus.” Hentschel emphasized that the pulpit dates from the mid-16th century. Unlike Gurlitt, Hentschel considered it “unlikely that such a magnificent pulpit, with rich sculptural decoration, would have stood in the relatively small castle chapel, as this would not have suited the frugal taste of Elector Augustus.”

The pulpit differs from Michaelis’ description in three details: it has a relief of the Resurrection of Christ on the right edge, which Michaelis does not mention. Hentschel suspected that the depiction in the Frauenkirche was obscured by the adjacent council gallery. The Bischofswerda pulpit lacks the Baptism of Christ described by Michaelis, and the supporting angel holds an open book instead of a tablet. It is possible the pulpit was altered later. Elector Augustus reportedly donated a pulpit to the Stolpen castle chapel in 1567, so an identity between the Bischofswerda and Stolpen pulpits cannot be excluded; it could be a close copy of the Frauenkirche pulpit.

=== Organ ===
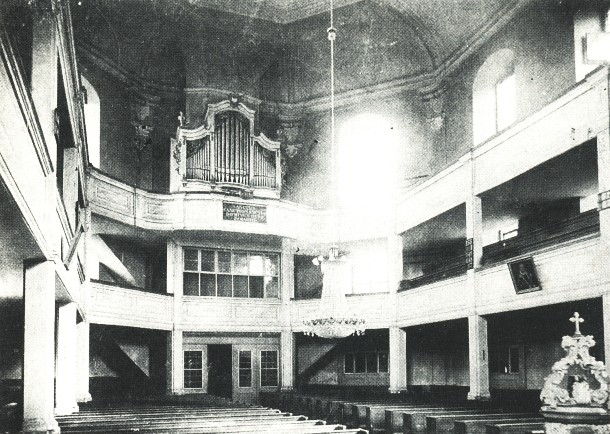
Photo of the Leibner organ, which had eleven stops from the old Frauenkirche organ; photo by August Kotzsch, circa 1885

From 1557 to 1559, master Lorentz Steer built an organ for 245 Gulden. It was repaired in 1568 by Jeorge Kretzmar. In 1622, a new organ by Tobias Weller (built from 1619) was installed, likely on the west gallery. The cost was 1000 Gulden. The organ case was painted by Sigismund Bergt and by 1714 depicted the Nativity and Adoration of the Magi “very neatly and large.”

Weller expanded the organ in 1653; it was renovated in 1680 by court organ builder Andreas Tamitius. In 1711, Johann Heinrich Gräber re-leathered the wind chests.

Disposition of the Frauenkirche organ in 1714:

Upper Manual
#	Stop	Pitch
1	Principal	8′ (Note: Tin)
2	Subbass	16′ (Note: Wood)
3	Gedackt	8′ (Note: “Made of good metal”)
4	Trumpet	8′
5	Octave	4′
6	Quintadena	8′
7	Quinte	3′
8	Gemshorn	2′
9	Schwegel	1′
10	Nasat	3′
11	Zimbel II	1/2′
12	Mixtur IV	2′

Lower Side Work (2nd Manual)
Principal	4′
Coarsely covered	8′
Small-scale	4′
Octave	2′
Zimbel (Octave)	1′
Sesquialtera II	

Pedal
Subbass	16′ (Note: Wooden foot)
Trombone	16′ (Note: Wood, brass)
Octave	8′

Additional stops: Zimbelstern, Tremulant, pedal and manual couplers.

Notes

After the old Frauenkirche was gradually demolished, the Weller organ was split: nine stops were donated in 1745 to the Plauen Church; the remaining eleven stops were used by Johann Christoph Leibner for a modest organ purchased by the Loschwitz community and consecrated in 1753.

Both organs no longer exist: the 1753 Loschwitz organ was replaced in 1899 by a Jehmlich Orgelbau Dresden organ, and the 1746 Plauen organ was destroyed in 1813 during the Battle of Dresden.

=== Bells ===
In 1472, the old Frauenkirche received its first bell turret, with bells installed the following year. Caspar Beyer built a new bell turret in 1497. Bells from the 16th and 17th centuries were cast by various masters, including Martin Hilliger and Johann Hilliger. Some were melted for armaments in 1917, while others were relocated or preserved in other churches.

Notable bells
Year	Founder	Height (cm)	Diameter (cm)	Inscription / Decoration	Origin	Fate
1489	Oswald Hilliger?	39.0	45.0	“die Silberne”, inscription: “Afe Maria Gracia, plena, Dominus thekum Mader myserikortie”	Altzella	Melted 1734
13th c.	unknown	63.7	70.8	Sugarloaf shape, no inscription	Altzella	Melted 1734
1518	Martin Hilliger?	69.0	84.6	“Afe Maria Gracia, plena, Dominus thekum Mader myserikortie mccccc xviii jar”	Altzella	Part of Frauenkirche bells
1619	Johann Hilliger	84.0	111.0	Hilliger coat of arms with inscription; angel and foliage	Dresden	Melted 1917

=== Additional Features and Church Decorations ===
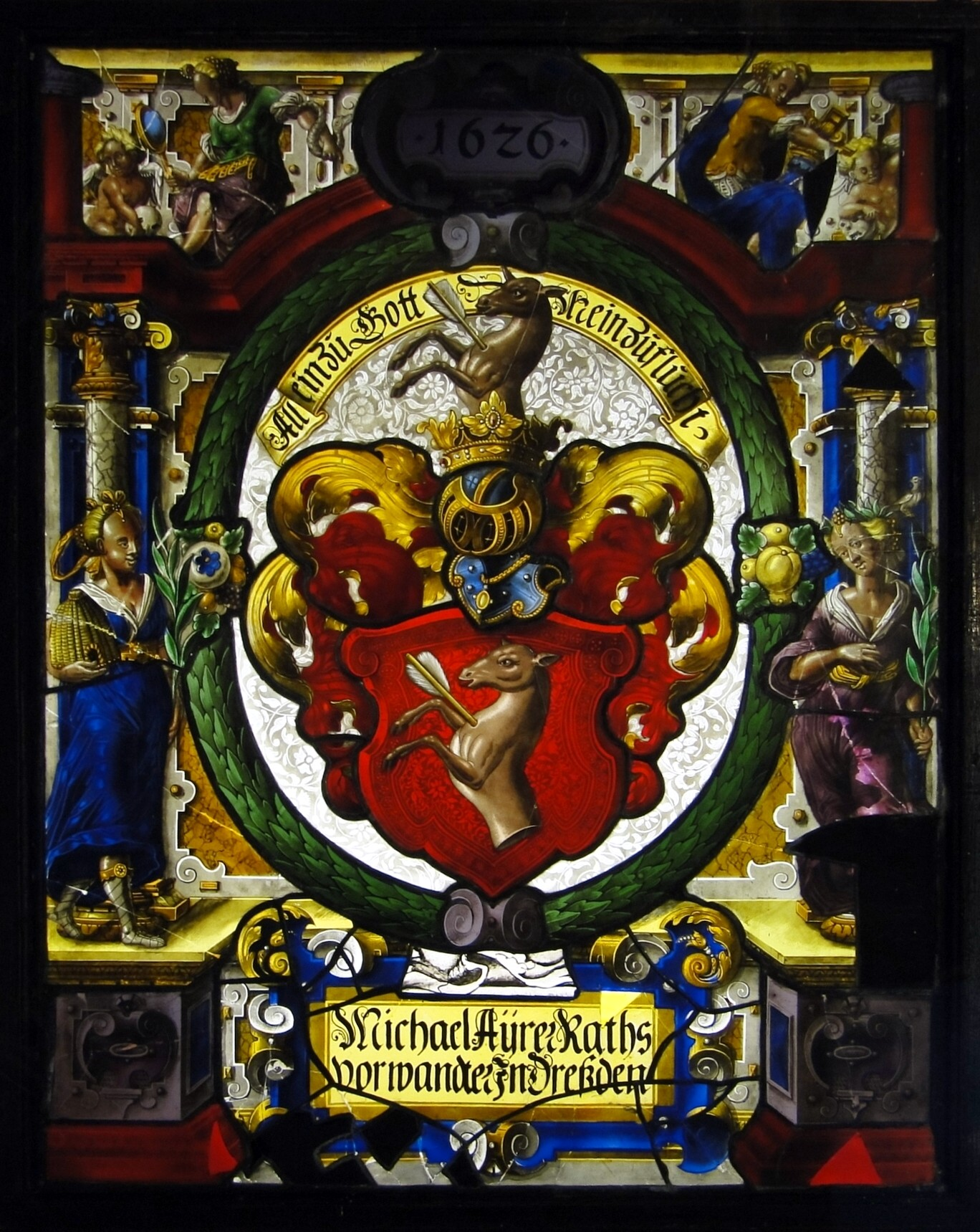
The Ayrer coat of arms glass panel from 1626

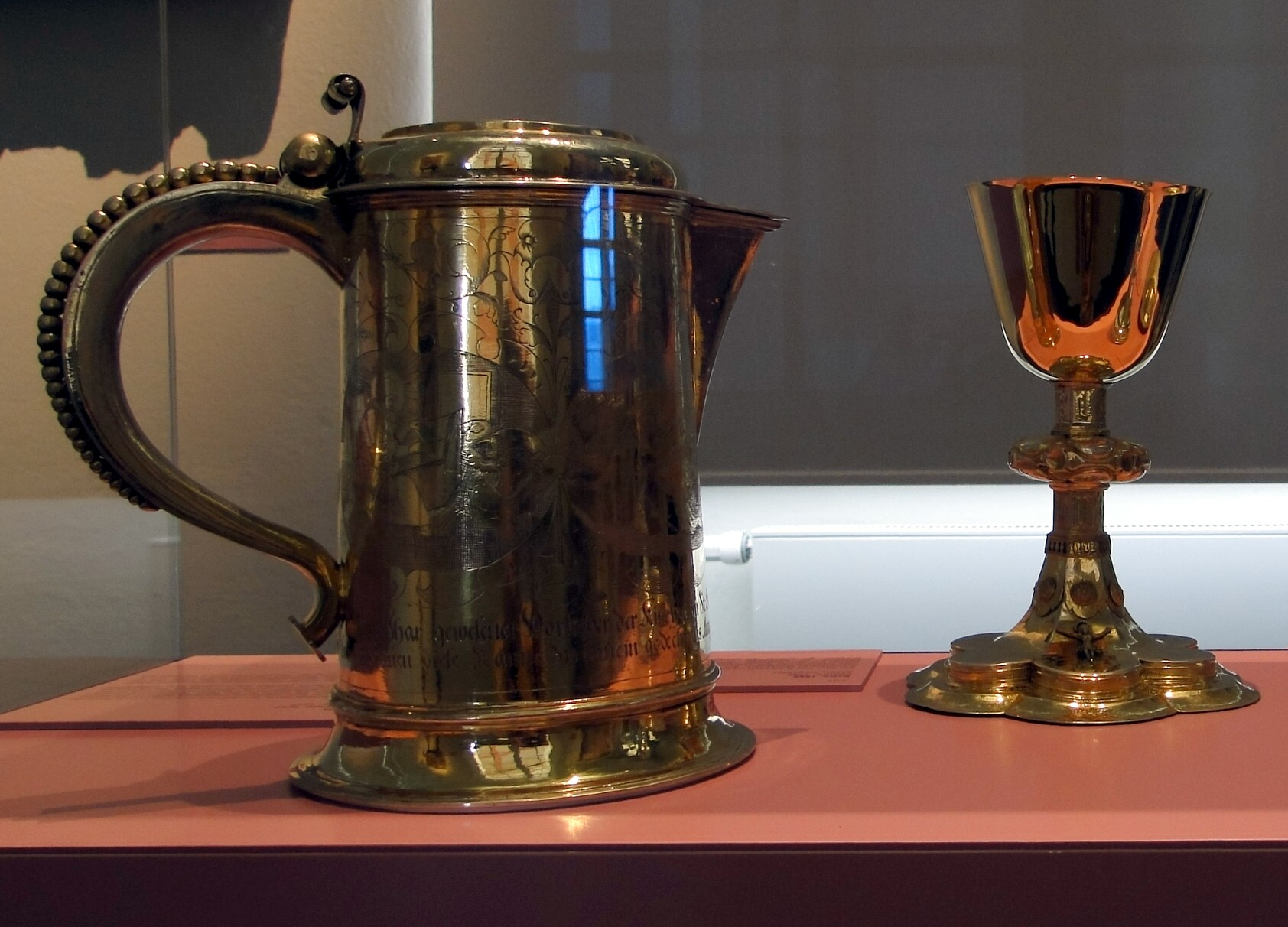
Communion jug and chalice from the old Frauenkirche

Interior Painting of the Church

Traces of paint on preserved arch fragments of the nave indicate that the church was likely painted gray inside during the Middle Ages, with white joints. Michaelis wrote in 1714 that the nave had two-story wooden galleries with gray-white marbling; parts of the choir were also marbled. The coffered ceiling of the nave from 1557 was painted until the end of the 16th century, including by Andreas Bretschneider; individual biblical scenes from the Old and New Testaments were donated, with the names of donors or their coats of arms indicated on the images. Like the coffered ceiling, the council gallery in the southern aisle was decorated with biblical scenes.

The vaults of the main choir were painted in 1596. The ceiling featured drawings of Saxon provincial coats of arms, with the Agnus Dei above the altar, while the other round arch depicted "the Passion of Christ / as hands / feet / and heart / along with the crown of thorns and three nails."

Windows and Chandeliers

Little is known about the window decorations. In 1626, jeweler Michael Ayrer donated a votive glass panel to the church. The so-called "Ayrer coat of arms panel" was placed in the window southeast of the altar and returned to the donor family after the church’s demolition. It remains in private ownership in Berlin.

The space was illuminated by a 24-arm chandelier that hung in the center of the choir. It was made in Nuremberg in 1667 and later hung in the Bähr reconstruction in the choir.

Church Vessels

Several vessels from the old Frauenkirche have survived. A gilded silver chalice was donated by Elector Augustus in 1558, according to the inscription on its foot. It is a late Gothic mass chalice from pre-Reformation times, refurbished in 1558 for Lutheran service. Two other chalices also date from the Gothic period.

A gilded silver communion jug, donated to the Frauenkirche in 1637 by Zacharias Heroldt, has also survived. It bears the maker’s mark of Dresden silversmith Michael Botza.

Baptismal Font

Since the Reformation, the old Frauenkirche no longer had a baptismal font, as baptisms were only performed at the Kreuzkirche. No information about a pre-Reformation font survives.

== Significance ==
=== Church and Churchyard as Burial Sites ===
For contemporaries, the Frauenkirche was especially significant as a burial site. Initially, only clergy could be buried here, but from the 16th century, donors, nobles, and citizens could also be interred. Among those buried were Johannes Cellarius, Christian Schiebling, Christophorus Bulaeus, Heinrich Schütz, and Andreas Herold. By around 1714, the walls and floor were covered with epitaphs, few of which have survived.

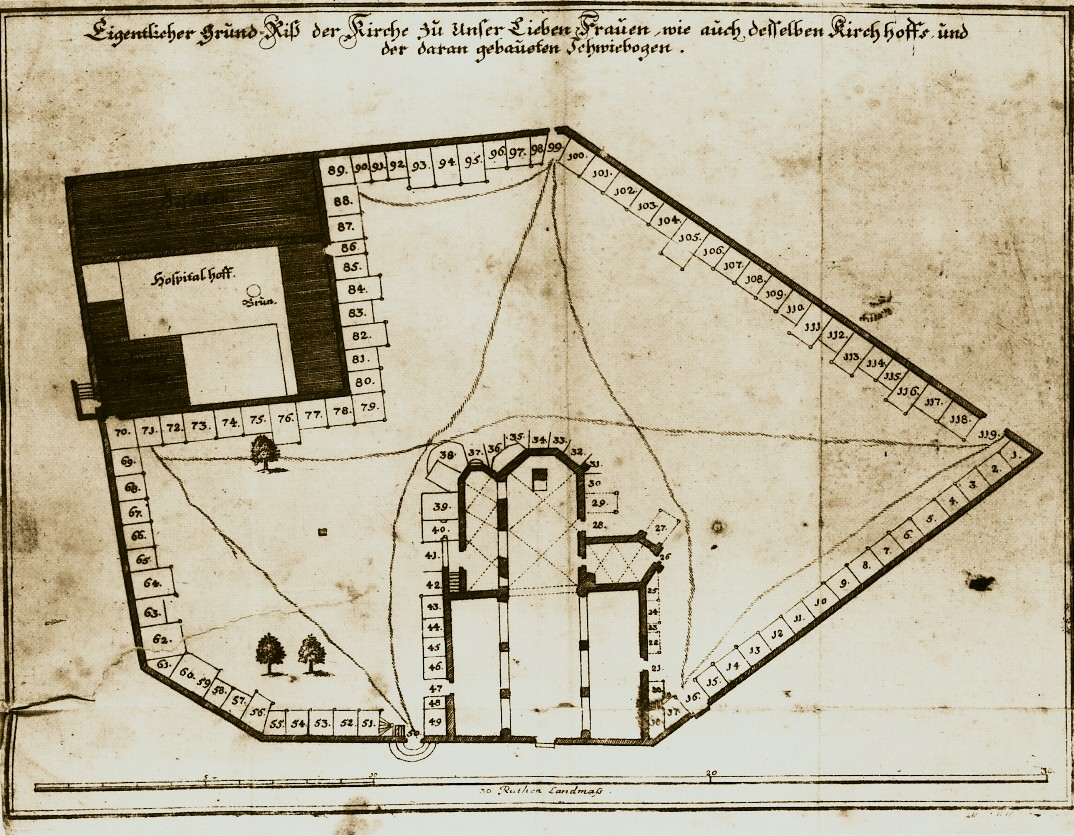
Geostated plan of the Frauenkirche and churchyard with indicated Schwibbögen; engraving by Moritz Bodenehr, 1714

The Frauenkirchhof also served as a burial ground. It is the oldest known cemetery in Dresden, with the earliest graves dating to around 1100. The churchyard was one of the few burial sites in the city, but by the 16th century it could not be expanded due to surrounding construction, so graves had to be reused frequently. Exhumed bones were relocated to the "Ossuary" in underground vaults on the churchyard. The ossuary was consecrated in 1514 by Bishop Johannes von Meißen. The stonemasons' and masons' brotherhood donated an altar to the ossuary chapel. A wooden statue of Saint Anne has likely survived from this altar. The ossuary above ground was dismantled in 1558, but the underground vaults remained and were still "completely filled with bones and secured with an iron door" in 1714.

Nobility preferred the Frauenkirche as an exclusive burial site, but its capacity soon became insufficient. From 1561 to 1562, master mason Voitt Grohe built Schwibbögen along the church wall and later along the entire cemetery wall. By 1565, the churchyard had over 100 hereditary burial places—Schwibbögen, chapel-like structures with their own crypts—raising its status as a burial site for wealthy citizens and nobility. Owners included Elector’s Master of Ordnance Caspar Vogt von Wierandt, whose crypt also held the executed Saxon chancellor Nikolaus Krell (1601), sculptor and Dresden mayor Hans Walther, and chamber master Hans Harrer. Some Schwibbögen were lavishly decorated, and the vaults painted, e.g., the family tomb of Centurio Wiebel by painter Samuel Bottschildt. The large number of artistically valuable epitaphs prompted the church sexton Johann Gottfried Michaelis in 1714 to publish Dreßdnische Inscriptiones und Epitaphia, recording 1,351 monuments and inscriptions from the Frauenkirche and churchyard. Mostly simple grave slabs survived, later used as building material for the new Frauenkirche and recovered during the 1994 clearance.

Otto Richter summarized the church’s significance as a burial site in 1895: "All in all, the Frauenkirche with its surroundings formed a true museum of venerable artworks and historical memories." Magirius emphasized the different levels of interest: "While Michaelis focused on the inscriptions still readable on monuments, 20th-century art historians were primarily interested in artistically valuable grave monuments, whereas contemporary archaeologists are mainly interested in burial forms and rites."

=== Changing Role as Mother and City Church ===
The Frauenkirche, probably founded shortly after 1000, is considered the oldest church in the Dresden Elbe Valley. In the Middle Ages, it was the parish church for an extensive parish: the entire eastern Elbe Valley up to the southern slopes belonged to the Frauenkirche; it was responsible for the entire Gau Nisan except Dohna and received the village of Poppitz as a dowry, gifted for its founding. A competing church arose only with the Nikolaikirche (from 1388 Kreuzkirche), built in a merchant settlement created shortly after 1100, 400 meters from the Frauenkirche. Its residents, as long-distance traders under royal protection, had higher social status than the Sorbs attending the Frauenkirche. The Nikolaikirche, despite having its own congregation, remained a subsidiary of the older Frauenkirche and retained that status when, around 1150, it became a city church with the settlement’s expansion. Parish and burial rights belonged to the Frauenkirche.

The Frauenkirche’s importance for the Dresden region declined as the city and its city church gained prominence; the Kreuzkirche, due to various relics, also became a pilgrimage site. By 1400, the parish priest moved from the Frauenkirche parsonage to that of the Kreuzkirche. Supported by the Elector, the Kreuzkirche was considered the citizens’ city church, while the Frauenkirche, supported by rural citizens, functioned as the countryside church. After its reconstruction from 1499 to 1516, the Kreuzkirche surpassed the medieval Frauenkirche in size and furnishings, though the Frauenkirche retained its role as a burial site. With the Reformation, the Frauenkirche lost its status as the city’s main church in 1539 to the Kreuzkirche.

From 1539 to 1559, no services were held at the Frauenkirche. Baptismal rights passed to the Kreuzkirche. In 1549, the Frauenkirche was incorporated into the city and became a second city church. The originally donated village of Poppitz transferred to the city in 1550 despite the parish priest’s protest. Due to spatial limitations, by 1714, ten of the original 26 villages were removed from the Frauenkirche parish. The 26 originally parished villages were:

- Bannewitz
- Blasewitz
- Boderitz
- Coschütz
- Cunnersdorf (1670 parished to Plauen)
- Dölzschen
- Gruna
- Kaitz (1670 parished to Leubnitz)
- Kleinpestitz
- Laubegast (1670 parished to Leuben)
- Löbtau (half)
- Loschwitz (from 1706 own Loschwitzer Kirche)
- Mockritz
- Kleinnaundorf
- Naußlitz
- Nöthnitz (1670 parished to Leubnitz)
- Prohlis (1670 parished to Leubnitz)
- Räcknitz
- Reick (half; 1670 parished to Leubnitz)
- Roßthal
- Seidnitz (1670 parished to Leuben)
- Strehlen
- Striesen
- Tolkewitz (1670 parished to Leuben)
- Wachwitz (from 1706 belonging to Loschwitz)
- Zschertnitz

The new church by George Bähr did not change the subordinate status of the evangelical Frauenkirche in Dresden’s church hierarchy. Only in 1878 was it raised to an independent parish church, incorporating parts of the Innere Altstadt and Pirnaische Vorstadt. In 1926, not the Frauenkirche but the Sophienkirche was elevated to the Protestant Cathedral of Saxony. Both churches were destroyed in 1945. The rebuilt Frauenkirche still has no permanent congregation.

== Bibliography ==
- Karlheinz Blaschke: Die Frauenkirche in der Dresdner Kirchengeschichte. In: Dresdner Geschichtsverein e. V. (ed.): Dresdner Frauenkirche. Geschichte – Zerstörung – Wiederaufbau. Dresdner Hefte, vol. 10, no. 32, 3rd edition, 1994, pp. 43–47.
- Cornelius Gurlitt: Die Frauenkirche. In: Cornelius Gurlitt (ed.): Beschreibende Darstellung der älteren Bau- und Kunstdenkmäler des Königreichs Sachsen. 21st booklet: City of Dresden. C. C. Meinhold & Sons, Dresden 1900, pp. 41–79.
- Gitta Kristine Hennig: Der Verlauf der Bautätigkeit an der Frauenkirche in den Jahren 1724–1727. In: Die Dresdner Frauenkirche. Jahrbuch zu ihrer Geschichte und zu ihrem archäologischen Wiederaufbau. Vol. 1. Schnell und Steiner, Regensburg 1995, pp. 86–110.
- Walter Hentschel: Dresdner Bildhauer des 16. und 17. Jahrhunderts. Hermann Böhlaus Nachfolger, Weimar 1966.
- Manfred Kobuch: Die Anfänge der Dresdner Frauenkirche. In: Die Dresdner Frauenkirche. Jahrbuch 2002. Hermann Böhlaus Nachfolger, Weimar 2002, ISBN 3-7400-1189-0, pp. 47–52.
- Heinrich Magirius: Die Dresdner Frauenkirche von George Bähr. Deutscher Verlag für Kunstwissenschaft, Berlin 2005, ISBN 3-87157-211-X, pp. 11–32.
- Heinrich Magirius: Die Kirche „Unser Lieben Frauen“ in Dresden – Der Vorgängerbau der Frauenkirche George Bährs. In: Die Dresdner Frauenkirche. Jahrbuch 2002. Hermann Böhlaus Nachfolger, Weimar 2002, ISBN 3-7400-1189-0, pp. 53–70.
- Johann Gottfried Michaelis: Dreßdnische Inscriptiones und Epitaphia. Welche Auf denen Monumentis derer in Gott ruhenden, so allhier in und außer der Kirche zu unser Lieben Frauen begraben liegen …. Schwencke, Alt-Dresden 1714, Preface.
- Otto Richter: Der Frauenkirchhof, Dresdens älteste Begräbnisstätte. In: Dresdner Geschichtsblätter, No. 2, 1894, pp. 124–134.
- Reinhard Spehr: Grabungen in der Frauenkirche von Nisan/Dresden. In: Judith Oexle (ed.): Frühe Kirchen in Sachsen. Ergebnisse archäologischer und baugeschichtlicher Untersuchungen. Konrad Theiss, Stuttgart 1994, pp. 206–217.
- Stadtmuseum Dresden, Stiftung Frauenkirche Dresden (ed.): Die Frauenkirche zu Dresden. Werden – Wirkung – Wiederaufbau. Ausstellungskatalog. Sandstein, Dresden 2005, pp. 11–27.
- Rainer Thümmel, Karl-Heinz Lötzsch: Das Glockengeläut der Dresdner Frauenkirche in Vergangenheit, Gegenwart und Zukunft. In: Die Dresdner Frauenkirche. Jahrbuch 2000. Hermann Böhlaus Nachfolger, Weimar 2000, ISBN 3-7400-1122-X, pp. 243–255.
