= Balthasar Permoser =

German sculptor (1651–1732)

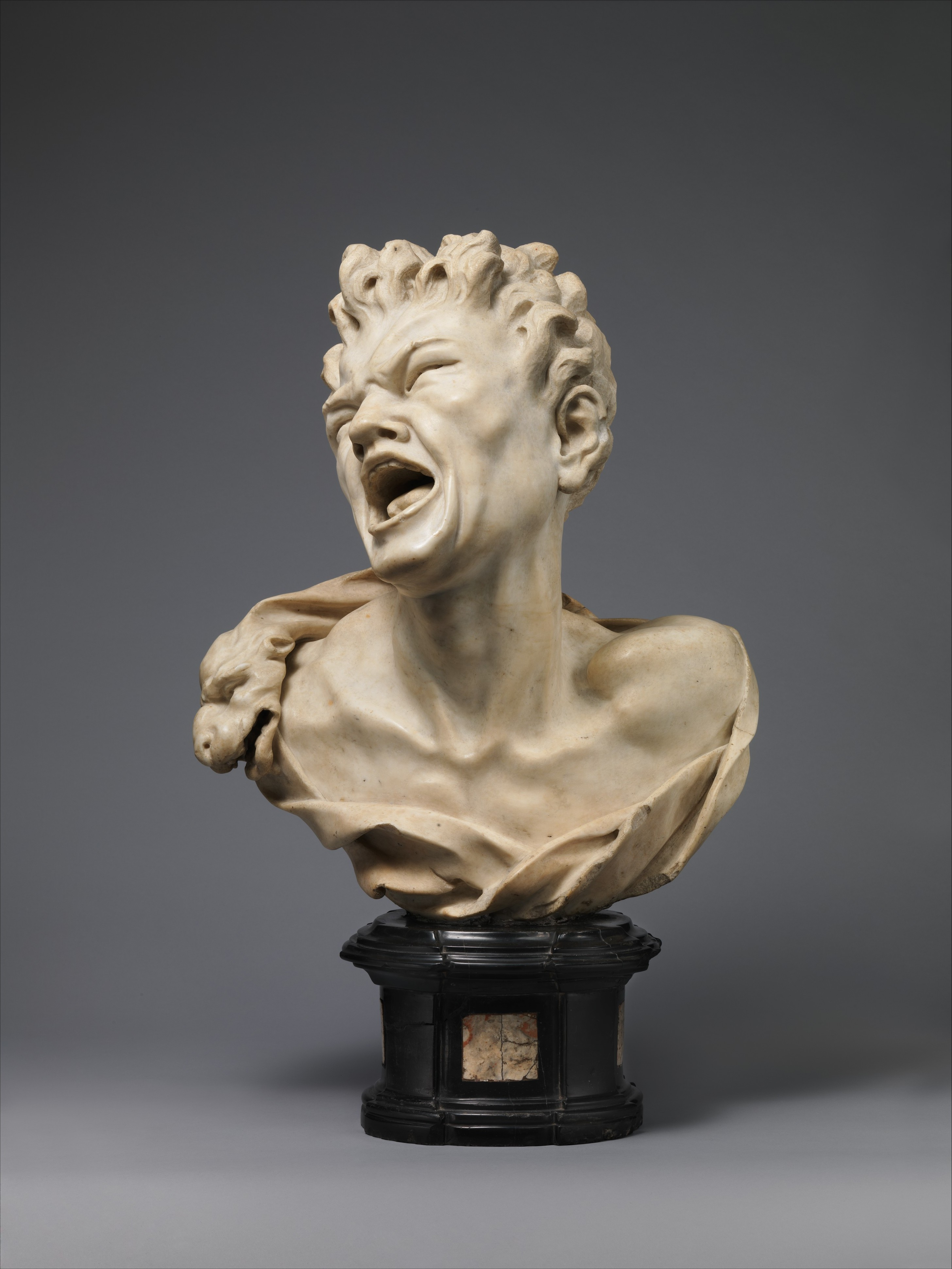
Bust of Marsyas (1680–1685).

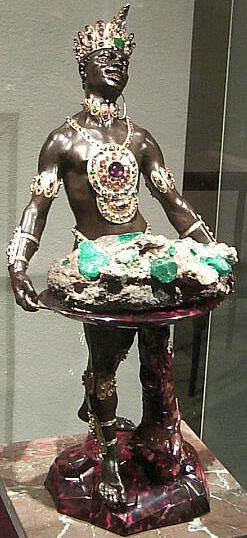
Moor with Emerald plate (1724).

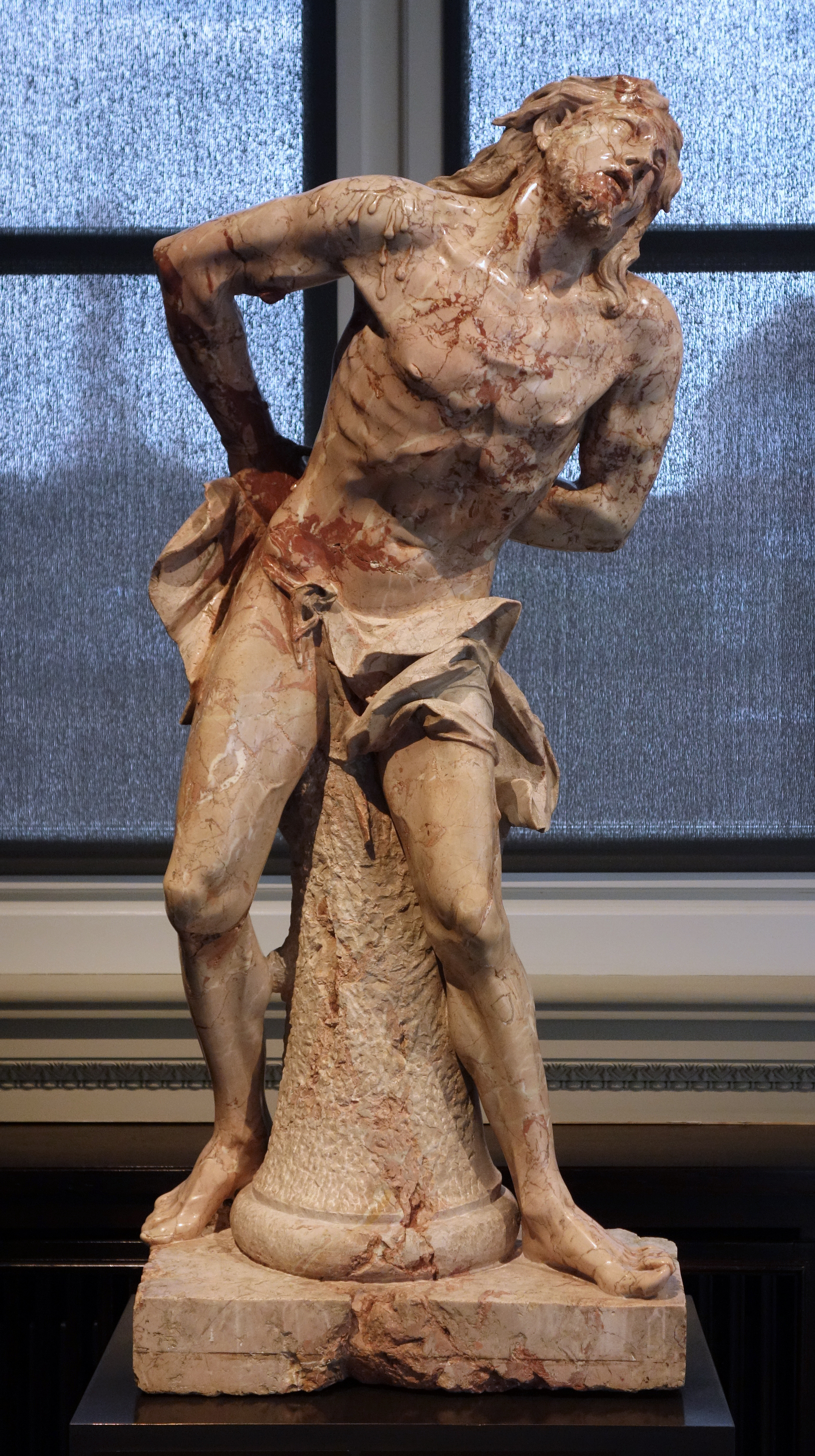
Christ at the martyr's column (c. 1725)

Balthasar Permoser (13 August 1651 – 18 February 1732) was among the leading sculptors of his generation, whose evolving working styles spanned the late Baroque and early Rococo.

== Biography ==
Permoser was born in Kammer bei Waging, Salzburg, today a part of the Bavarian town of Traunstein. He was trained first in Salzburg, in the workshop of Wolf Weißenkirchner the Younger and in Vienna, where he learned the art of ivory carving, before he left in 1675 on a trip to Florence to work for Giovanni Battista Foggini, in whose studio he remained fourteen years, maturing his style. Called to Dresden in 1689 by Johann Georg III, Elector of Saxony, he executed two monumental garden sculptures of Hercules.

In 1697, on the way to Italy once more, Permoser remained almost a year in his old haunts during which he sculpted the atlantes for the west doorway of the Hofstallung in Salzburg. In the years 1704–1710, he worked at the Schloß Charlottenburg near Berlin.

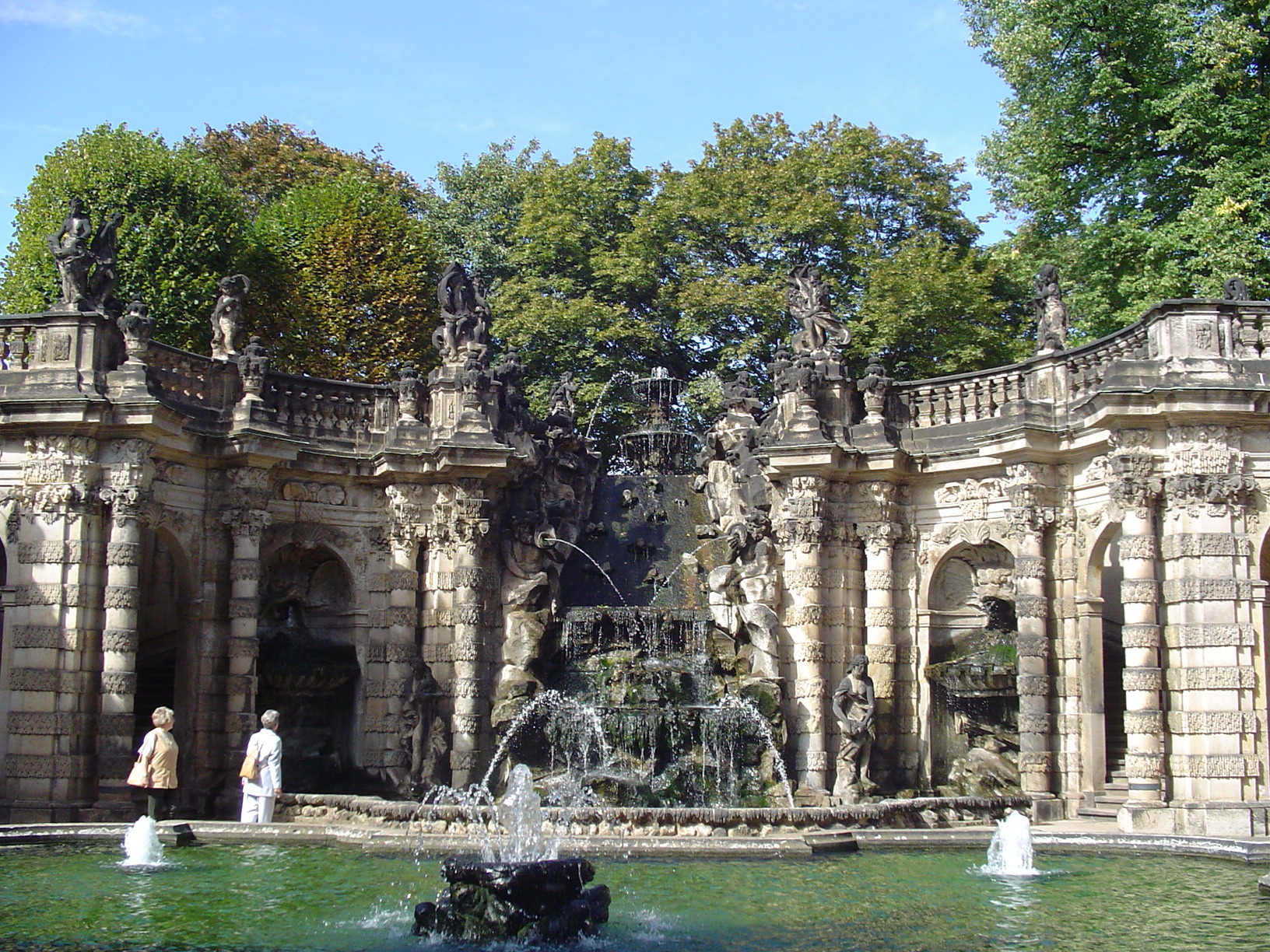
Permoser's sculpture in the Nymphenbad, Zwinger.

In 1710, Permoser returned to Dresden to collaborate with the architect Matthäus Daniel Pöppelmann on the Zwinger palace, built 1710–28 for Augustus the Strong, Elector of Saxony, where he provided full-blown Roman Baroque sculptural details; for the Wallpavillon he provided six of the twelve festive, flexing, grimacing atlantes for which he is most remembered. For the Zwinger he also provided the sculptures for the Nymphenbad fountain. He died in Dresden.

Permoser's most famous independent, free-standing sculpture is an over-lifesize marble Apotheosis of Prince Eugene (1718–21; Österreichische Galerie Belvedere, Vienna), where the main figure, depicted with the attributes of Hercules, and secondary figures of Fame and a fallen Turk are linked in a tour-de-force of complicated Berninian diagonals that did not satisfy Prince Eugene of Savoy's classicizing taste. His two polychromed wood figures of St Augustine and St Ambrose, made for the high altar of the Dresden Hofkirche (1725), are in the Stadtmuseum, Bautzen, while the sculptural pulpit he carved for the chapel of Augustus was relocated in the Hofkirche, begun in 1738. He also provided sculpture for the wall-tomb of Sophie of Saxony and Wilhelmine Ernestine of the Palatine, in the Freiberg Cathedral.

Permoser collaborated as a modeller in the Dresden workshops of Johann Melchior Dinglinger, court jeweller to Augustus; notable examplars of this kind of collaboration are the two sculptures of Moors by Permoser, encrusted with jewelled decor by Dinglinger, in the Neues Grünes Gewölbe, Dresden. Permoser provided models to be executed in polished red stoneware at Augustus' manufactory at Meissen, notably a series of commedia dell'arte figures, ca 1710–12, that are the precursors of the porcelain figurines made first at Meissen and copied by manufactories all over Europe.

Permoser's private works extended to portrait busts, Rococo collector's sculptures of polychromed wood or ivory, reliquaries that combined sculpture and architecture, and sentimental works for personal devotion. Permoser's pupil Paul Egell and Egell's pupil Johann Joachim Kändler carried Permoser's style forward into the mid-eighteenth century.

== Bibliography ==
- Sigfried Asche, 1978. Balthasar Permoser: Leben und Werk, Deutscher Verlag für Kunstwissenschaft
