= Kunstsammlungen Zwickau =

German museum

Coordinates: 50.725817°N 12.489733°E

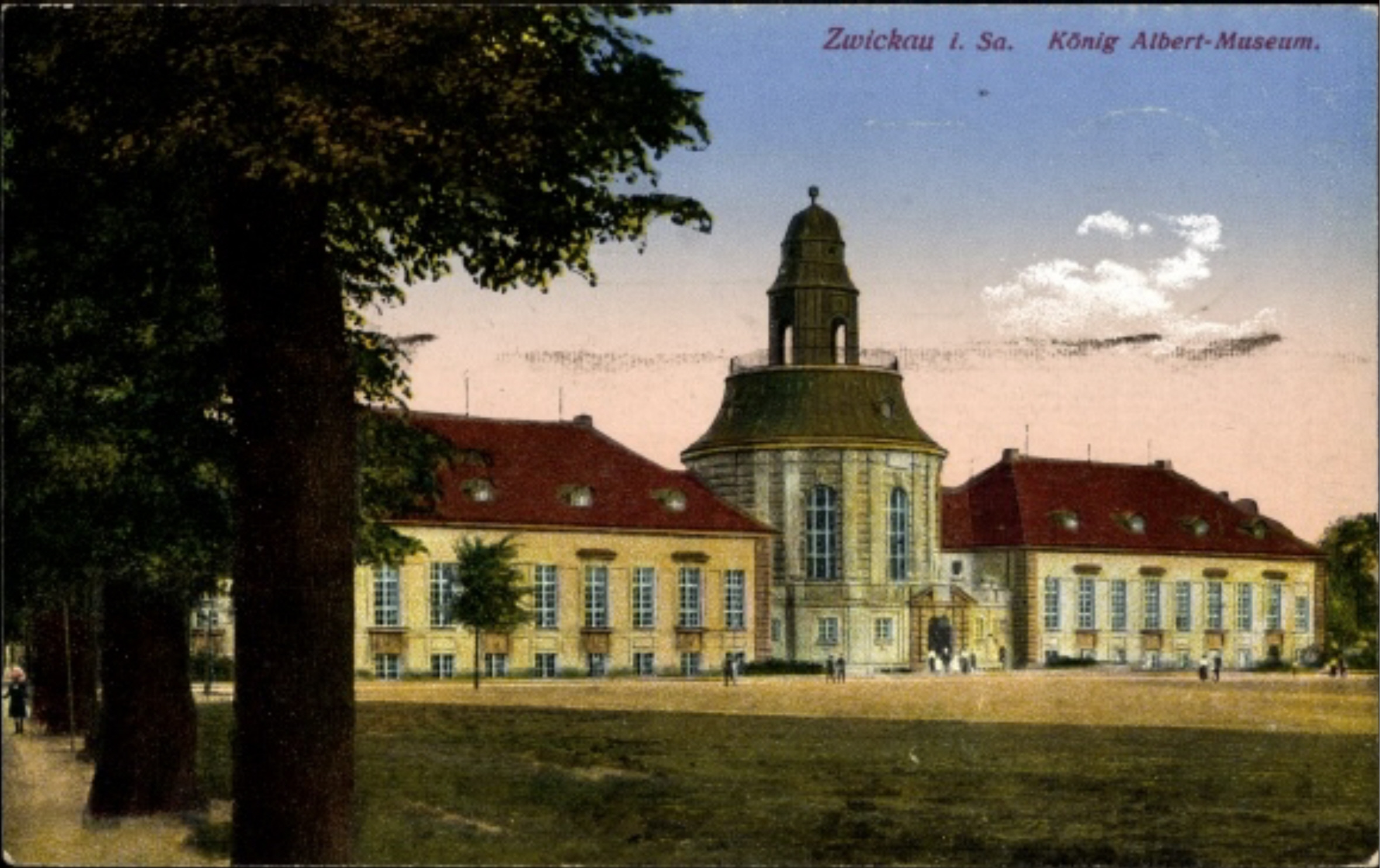
König-Albert-Museum in Zwickau 1918

The Kunstsammlungen Zwickau – Max Pechstein Museum is a department of the Städtisches Museum Zwickau founded in 1925, which was inaugurated on 23 April 1914 as the King Albert Museum

== Previous history ==
The new building by the architect Richard Schiffner was initially constructed to house the Ratsschulbibliothek Zwickau, the mineral Collection donated in 1868, the manuscript of the council archives and the art objects owned by the municipality, as well as the collection of the Antiquities Society. Today it houses the art collections (including the sculpture collection), the mineral collection dating back to the mineral collection of the Zwickau mining factor Ernst Julius Richter geowissenschaftliche Abteilung and thee Ratsschulbibliothek.

== Development of the art collections ==
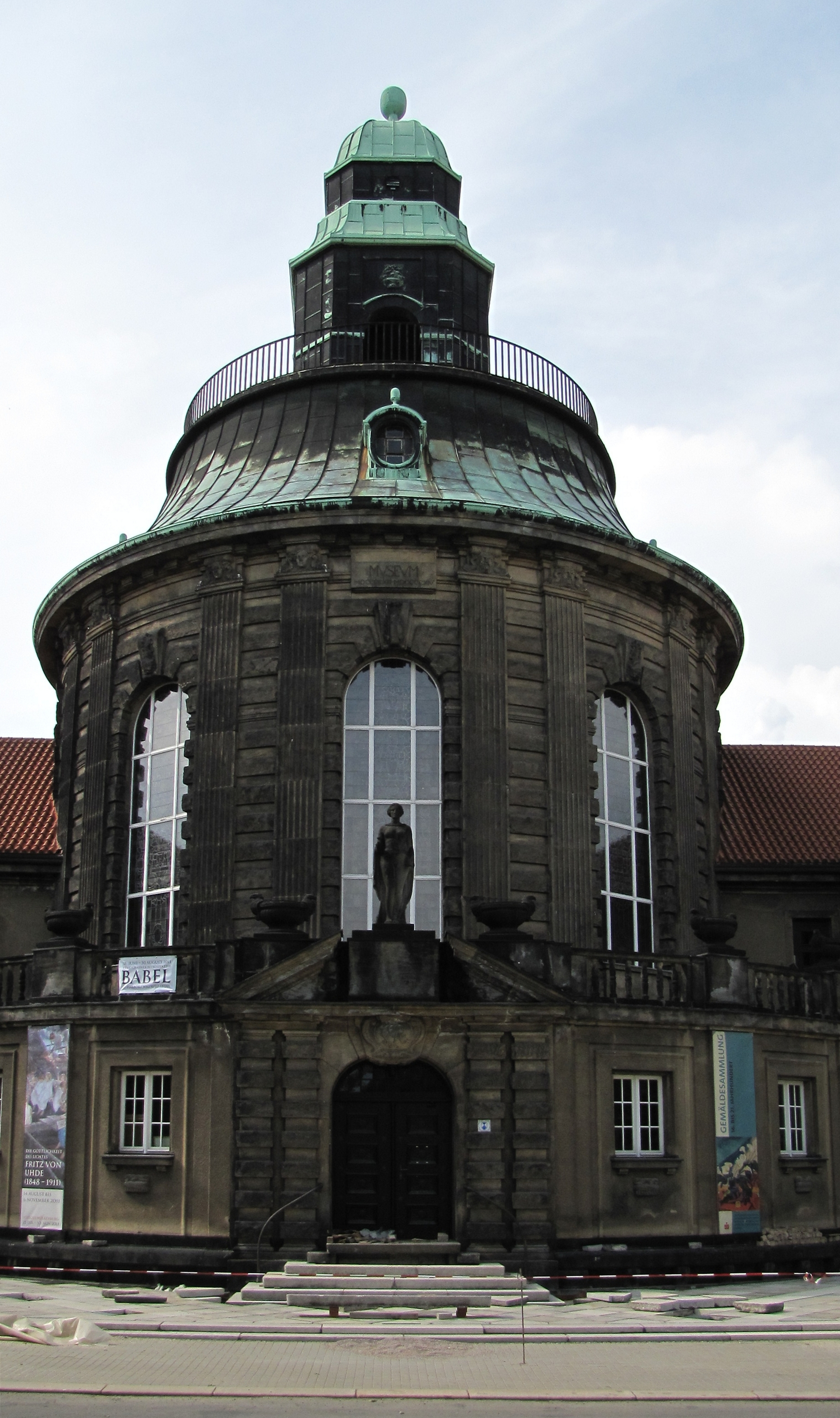
Museum in Zwickau

From 1925 to 1930, the art historian Hildebrand Gurlitt headed the König-Albert-Museum. Gurlitt's appointment in 1925 was to become the beginning of the development of a purposeful art collection. He focused on works by contemporary painters and organised numerous exhibitions. Thus, in 1925 he presented works by Max Pechstein, in 1926 the focus was on Käthe Kollwitz and young Dresden, in 1927 works by Erich Heckel and Karl Schmidt-Rottluff were shown, and in 1928 an exhibition was dedicated to Emil Nolde. Gurlitt was in close personal contact with numerous artists of his time, for example with Ernst Barlach, whom he tried to win over as late as 1937 for the decoration of the tympanum of the Hamburger Petrikirche, which Barlach refused, however, in order not to get his patrons such as Hermann Fürchtegott Reemtsma into trouble.

Gurlitt had the Bauhaus in Dessau design and paint the Zwickau museum; this redesign, which was presented to the public in 1926, met with national acclaim. Some of the local press was less enthusiastic – not only about the redesign of the museum, but also about Gurlitt's progressive taste in art. Press campaigns against Gurlitt's preferred acquisition of modern art also brought into play the financial constraints of the city of Zwickau, which played a role in his dismissal on 1 April 1930, in addition to his not purely "Aryan" origin.

Gurlitt's successors Sigfried Asche and Rudolf von Arps-Aubert then also acted much more cautiously during the National Socialist era and preferred more innocuous areas of collecting. Gertrud Rudloff-Hille and Marianne Vater, who worked for the museum in the post-war period, in some cases again followed Gurlitt's line somewhat, but also expanded the art collection after 1945 to include numerous Romantic works. An exhibition of works by Max Pechstein and the award of an honorary doctorate to this artist in 1947 can also be seen as a continuation of Gurlitt's efforts for the Zwickau collection. In the 1960s and 1970s, however, such efforts were fraught with difficulties in the GDR and also no longer took place under the folklorist Richard Wolf, who was in office from 1963 to 1986.

The only exception was a donation from Fritz Bleyl in 1966, who gave the museum woodcuts by Erich Heckel and Ernst Ludwig Kirchner in addition to his own works. In 1971, the art collections received the Old Masters painting collection from the estate of the art historian Walter Hentschel.

After the Peaceful Revolution, efforts were made to fill the gaps in the holdings. The museum's urban history department moved to the "Priest Houses" museum complex in 2003, while the art collections continue to be housed in the now listed building of the King Albert Museum.

In autumn 2011, the museum's "Plastikhalle" was reopened as a display collection of late Gothic and early Baroque sculptures.

In April 2014, the Max Pechstein Museum opened in the Kunstsammlungen Zwickau. The house is officially named Kunstsammlungen Zwickau - Max Pechstein Museum.

== Building ==
The main entrance is on the southern side of the central domed building facing the Festplatz (formerly Hindenburg-Platz, today Platz der Völkerfreundschaft). From the domed building, which is closed off by a viewing platform, there are three wings at right angles to each other, of which the eastern wing houses the Ratsschulbibliothek Zwickau and the city archive including reading room. The west wing houses the mineralogical-geological collections in the basement, the sculpture collection on the ground floor and the painting collection on the upper floor. The single-storey north wing houses special exhibitions and storage rooms. The eclectic representative building with its neo-baroque façade decoration is a listed building.

== Directors ==
- Hildebrand Gurlitt, first museum director, 1925–1930.
- Heinrich Kleinebreil, actually head of the city library, became managing director on the side, 1930–1933.
- Sigfried Asche, 1933–1936.
- Rudolf von Arps-Aubert, 1936–1945.
- Gertrud Rudloff-Hille, 1945–1950.
- Marianne Vater, 1950–1963.
- Richard Wolf, 1963–1986.
