= Sigfried Asche =

German art historian

Sigfried Asche (26 June 1906 – 16 February 1985) was a German art historian and museum director.

== Career ==
Born in Dresden, Asche attended the Kreuzschule in Dresden. Afterwards, he studied history of art, classical archaeology, history and German studies first in his native city of Dresden, later in Vienna and University of Leipzig. In 1934 he received his doctorate in Leipzig. In 1933 he became director of the Kunstsammlungen Zwickau and in 1936 director of the Städtische Kunstsammlungen Görlitz. Together with Cornelius Müller Hofstede, he operated "decisively and actively the exploitation of former Jewish art possessions". "So we don't have to go by our unreal funds," wrote Sigfried Asche in a letter of 29 April 1940 to Cornelius Müller-Hofstede, after he had gone through the Sachs collection together with the Breslau art historian Hubertus Lossow and compiled a wish list. First Cornelius Müller-Hofstede was allowed to make his claims, and only then was Asche also allowed to register his wishes. Thus Asche succeeded in bringing a painting by Lovis Corinth, which came from the possession of Otto Ollendorff in Breslau, to Görlitz. But works from the Jewish collections of Sachs and Leo Smoschewer also came to Görlitz, including paintings by Adolf Dressler, Corinth, Fritz von Uhde, Wilhelm Trübner, Albert Weisgerber, Jules Dupré, Alexander Kanoldt, Konrad von Kardorff, Carlo Mense and sculptures by Georg Kolbe. After Prague was occupied by the German Wehrmacht, Asche became museum director there.

After the Second World War, Asche was initially busy rebuilding the art collection in Görlitz and became involved in the restoration and reconstruction of destroyed churches in Upper Lusatia. After working briefly for the Staatliche Museen zu Berlin in 1951, Asche became director of the Wartburg Foundation in Eisenach in 1952. In this capacity, he had numerous building measures carried out at the castle. Among other things, the ballroom, which was in danger of collapsing, was to be secured and the frescos of Moritz von Schwind were to be saved. However, the demolition of the Ritgentreppe, which led from the castle courtyard to the Palas, was the main subject of public discussion. Asche had ordered it in order to restore the arcaded front of the Wartburg to the same condition as in the 13th century. Furthermore, he had the neo-Gothic windows with the painted panes from the 16th century torn out of the west wall of the Dürnitz, the wall bricked up and smaller windows inserted. A false ceiling was inserted into the armoury hall, which was to be stabilised, so that the upper half could be added to the Wartburg Museum, while a sales room for souvenirs and tickets could be set up below. Hans-Joachim Rehm and Renate Sabrowsky commented on this measure as follows: "The former armoury had thus finally been extinguished, it was its second death."

In 1960, Asche left the GDR and went to the Federal Republic. In an eleven-page letter, Asche explained the reasons to Minister President of the GDR Otto Grotewohl. For him, the Wartburg was a symbol of an undivided Germany and could not be misused for ideological purposes. He also saw the Wartburg Foundation as being restricted in its freedom of action by the GDR leadership. However, there were also rumours that Asche had been confronted with his past in Prague by the visit of two Czechs two days before his escape and had therefore absconded to the West. In West Germany, the escape was reported in nationwide newspapers and magazines such as Die Zeit, Die Welt and Der Spiegel. Asche retired in 1970 and died in 1985 in Staufen im Breisgau at the age of 79.

== Publications ==
- Sächsische Barockplastik von 1630 bis zur Zeit Permosers. Leipzig 1934 (Dissertation).
- Malerei und Graphik der Oberlausitz. Städt. Kunstsammlung, Görlitz 1940.
- Drei Bildhauerfamilien an der Elbe. Acht Meister des 17. Jahrhunderts und ihre Werke in Sachsen, Böhmen und Brandenburg. Rohrer, Wien/Wiesbaden 1961.
- Die Wartburg. Geschichte und Gestalt. Rembrandt-Verlag, Berlin 1962.
- Balthasar Permoser und die Barockskulptur des Dresdner Zwingers. Weidlich, Frankfurt, 1966.
- Balthasar Permoser. Leben und Werk. Deutscher Verlag für Kunstwissenschaft, Berlin 1978, ISBN 3-87157-070-2.
