= Walter Hentschel =

German art historian

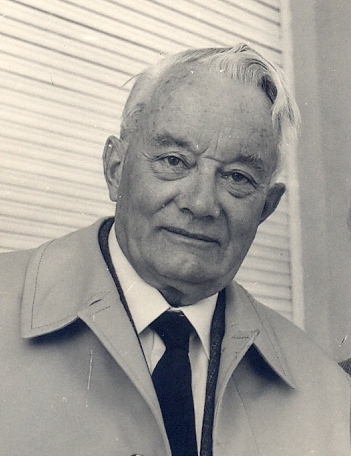
Walter Hentschel

Walter August Wilhelm Hentschel (25 March 1899 – 22 December 1970) was a German art historian.

== Life ==
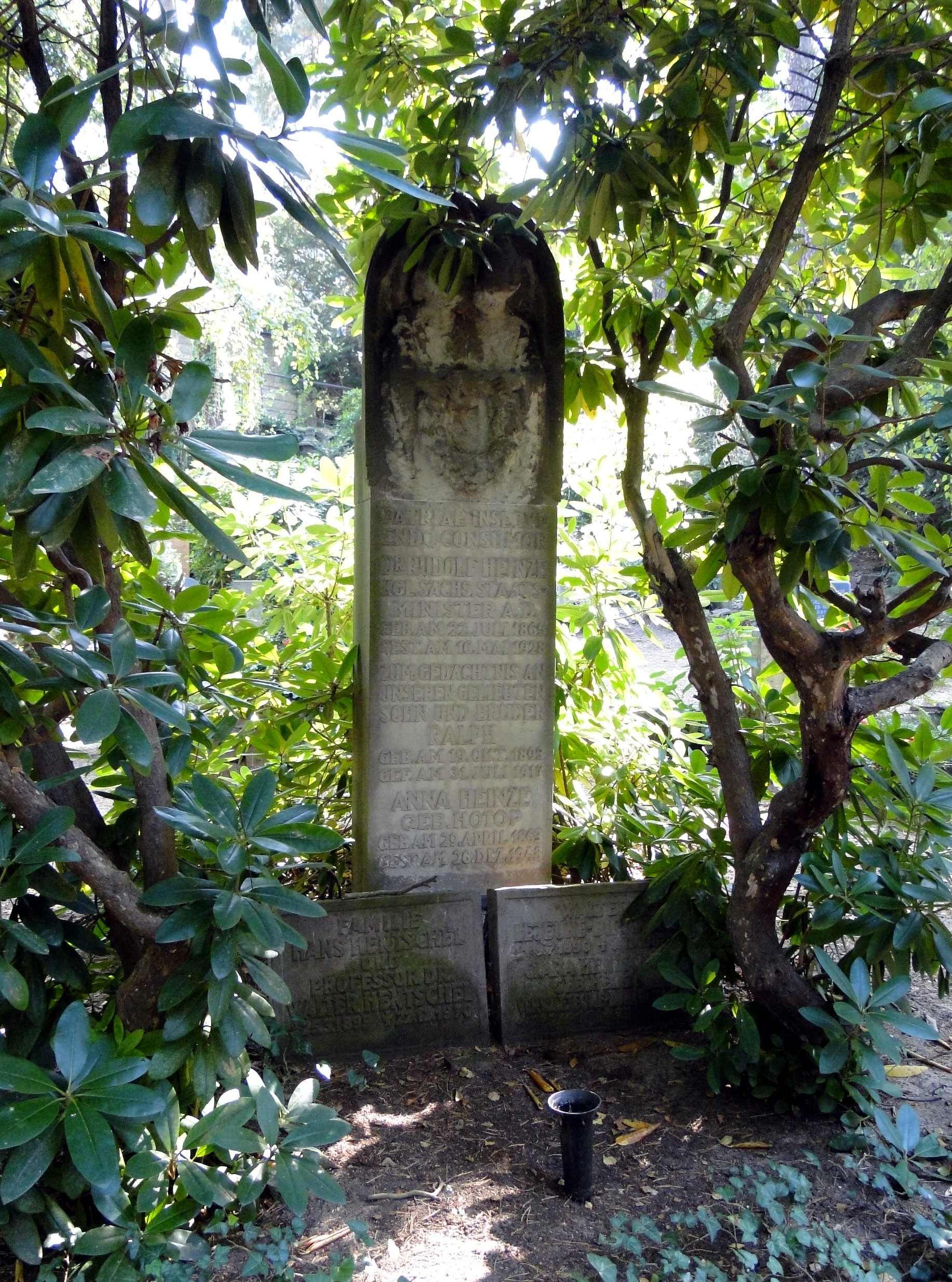
Walter Hentschel's grave at the Weißer Hirsch forest cemetery

Born in Zwickau, Hentschel began studying art history and history at the University of Würzburg, the University of Rostock, the University of Kiel and the University of Leipzig after taking his Abitur in Zwickau in 1917. In Leipzig, Hentschel was awarded a doctorate in 1923 under Wilhelm Pinder with a thesis on Hans Witten, The Master H. W.. He went to Dresden in the same year and found employment here as an assistant in the Skulpturensammlung and in 1925 at the Landesamt für Denkmalpflege Sachsen under Walter Bachmann.

In 1945, he became Landesmuseumspfleger for Saxony and led the reconstruction of the non-state museums in the state. From 1948, Hentschel worked as a freelancer, and in 1950 he came to the Institute of Art History at the Technical University of Dresden as senior assistant to Eberhard Hempel (1886-1967) and initially became a professor with a teaching assignment there in 1953. In 1950 he was a member of the managing committee of the building chamber of the regional church office, which included, in addition to him, O. Hempel, Hultsch, Müller, Nadler, Rietsche. In 1955, the Dresden University of Technology appointed him professor of art history and monument conservation. Two years later, he also took over the direction of the Institute for Art History and headed the Collection of Architectural Art. From 1961, he was a full member of the Saxon Academy of Sciences. In 1966, he became emeritus professor. Hentschel died in 1970 in Dresden at the age of 71 and was buried at the Waldfriedhof Weißer Hirsch. Part of his estate is in the Hauptstaatsarchiv Dresden. He bequeathed his collection of old masters to the Kunstsammlungen Zwickau.

The focus of his research was Saxon art history and architecture. One of his central works, Dresdner Bildhauer des 16. und 17. Jahrhunderts, dealt with the Walther family of sculptors. The collection of material and the writing of the work took about 40 years.

== Publications ==
- Sächsische Plastik um 1500, Wilhelm Limpert-Verlag, Dresden 1926.
- Meißner Bildhauer zwischen Spätgotik und Barock, Verlag der Truhe, Meißen 1934.
- Hans Witten. Der Meister H. W., Verlag E.A. Seemann, Leipzig 1938.
- Peter Breuer. Eine spätgotische Bildschnitzerwerkstatt, Wolfgang Jess Verlag, Dresden 1951.
- Kursächsischer Eisenkunstguss. Vol. 4. Forschungen zur Sächsischen Kunstgeschichte, Wolfgang Jess Verlag, Dresden 1955.
- Die sächsische Baukunst des 18. Jahrhunderts in Polen, Henschelverlag Kunst und Gesellschaft, Berlin 1967.
- Dresdner Bildhauer des 16. und 17. Jahrhunderts, Hermann Böhlaus Nachfolger, Weimar 1966.
- Die Zentralbauprojekte Augusts des Starken. Ein Beitrag zur Rolle des Bauherrn im deutschen Barock, Akademie-Verlag, Berlin 1969.
- Denkmale sächsischer Kunst. Die Verluste des 2. Weltkrieges. Akademie-Verlag, Berlin 1973 (Schriften zur Kunstgeschichte vol. 15).
