= Dresden =

Capital city of Saxony, Germany

Dresden Dräsdn (Upper Saxon) Drježdźany (Upper Sorbian)
- City
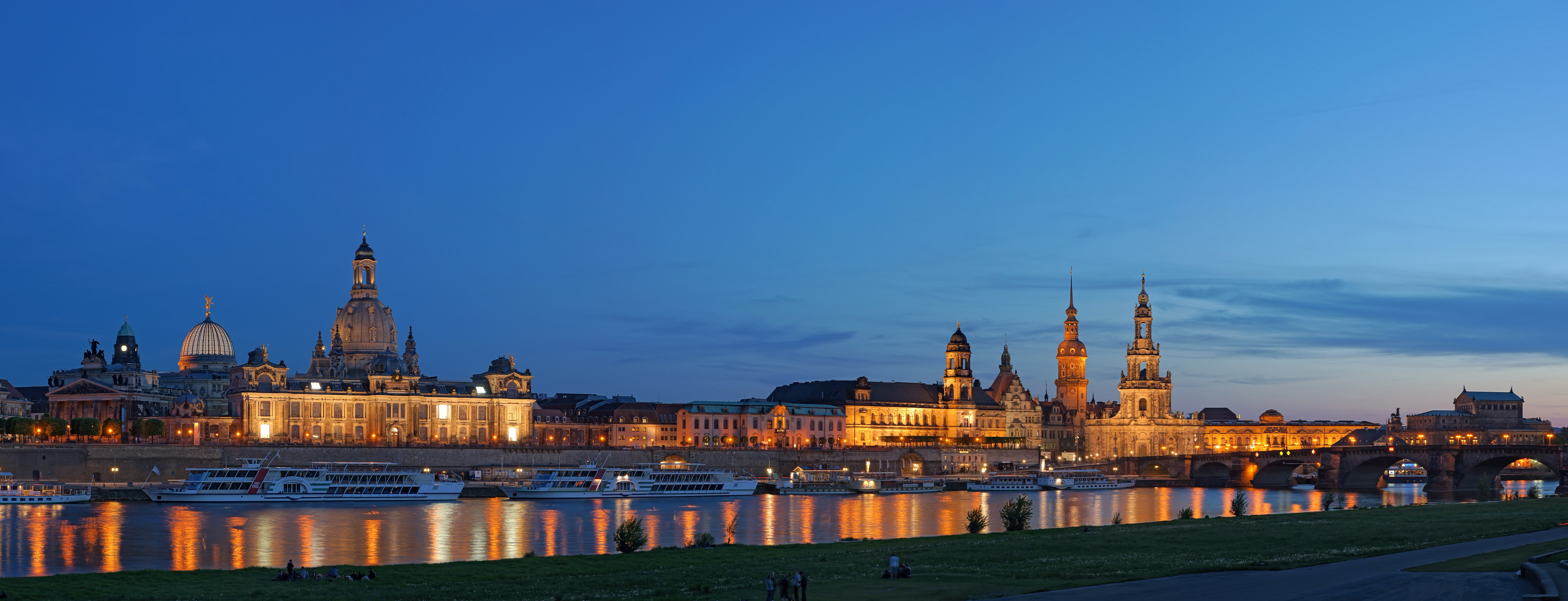
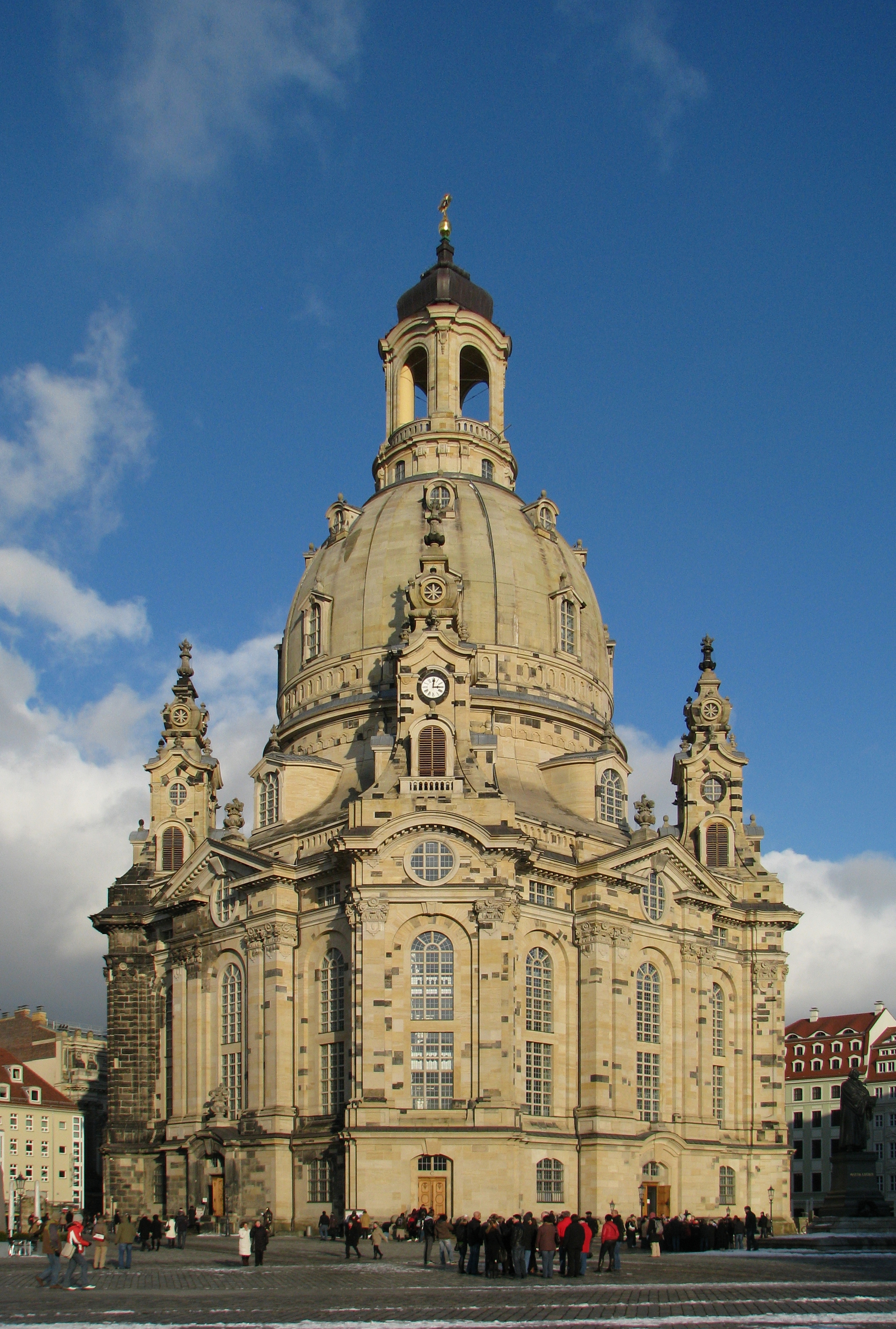
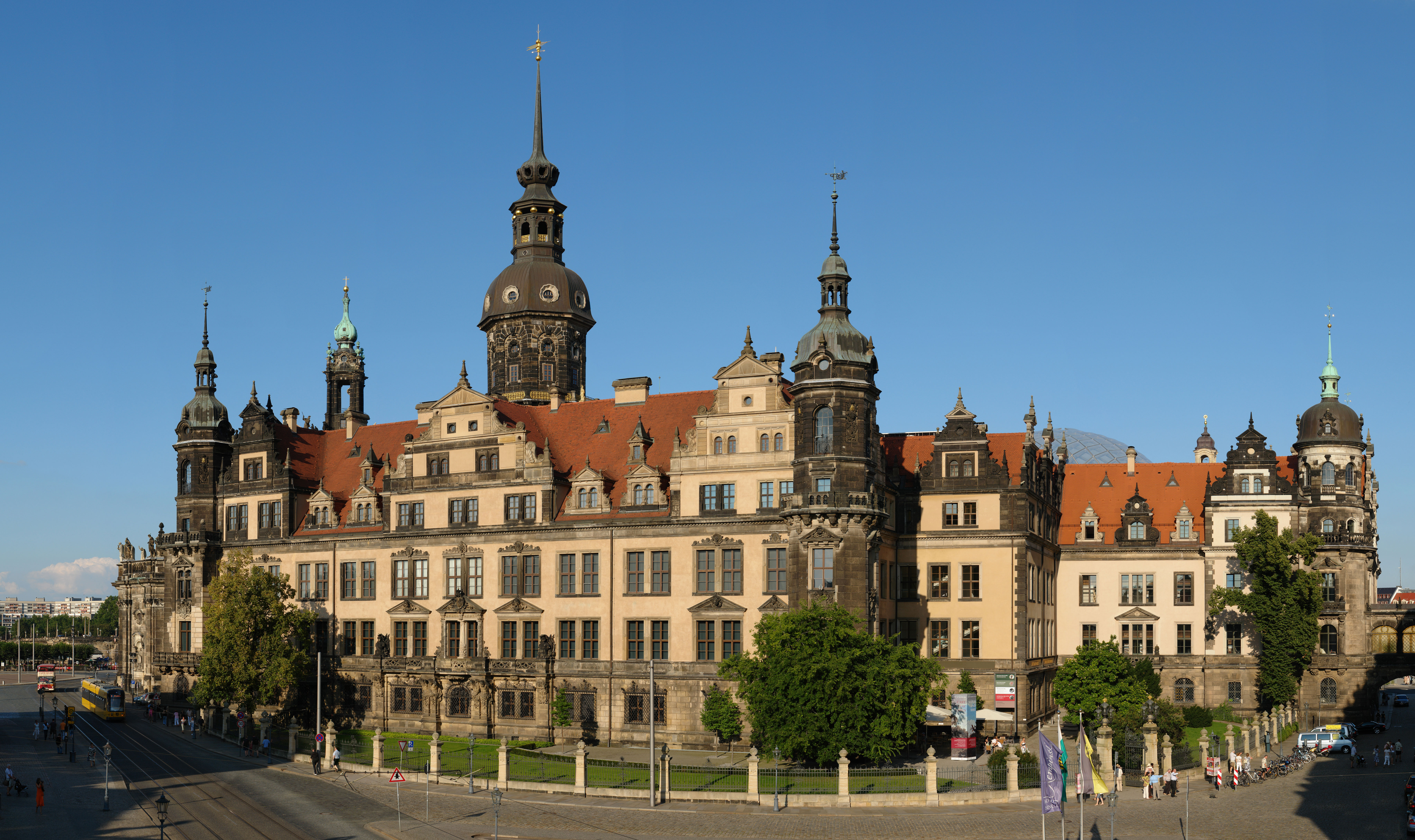
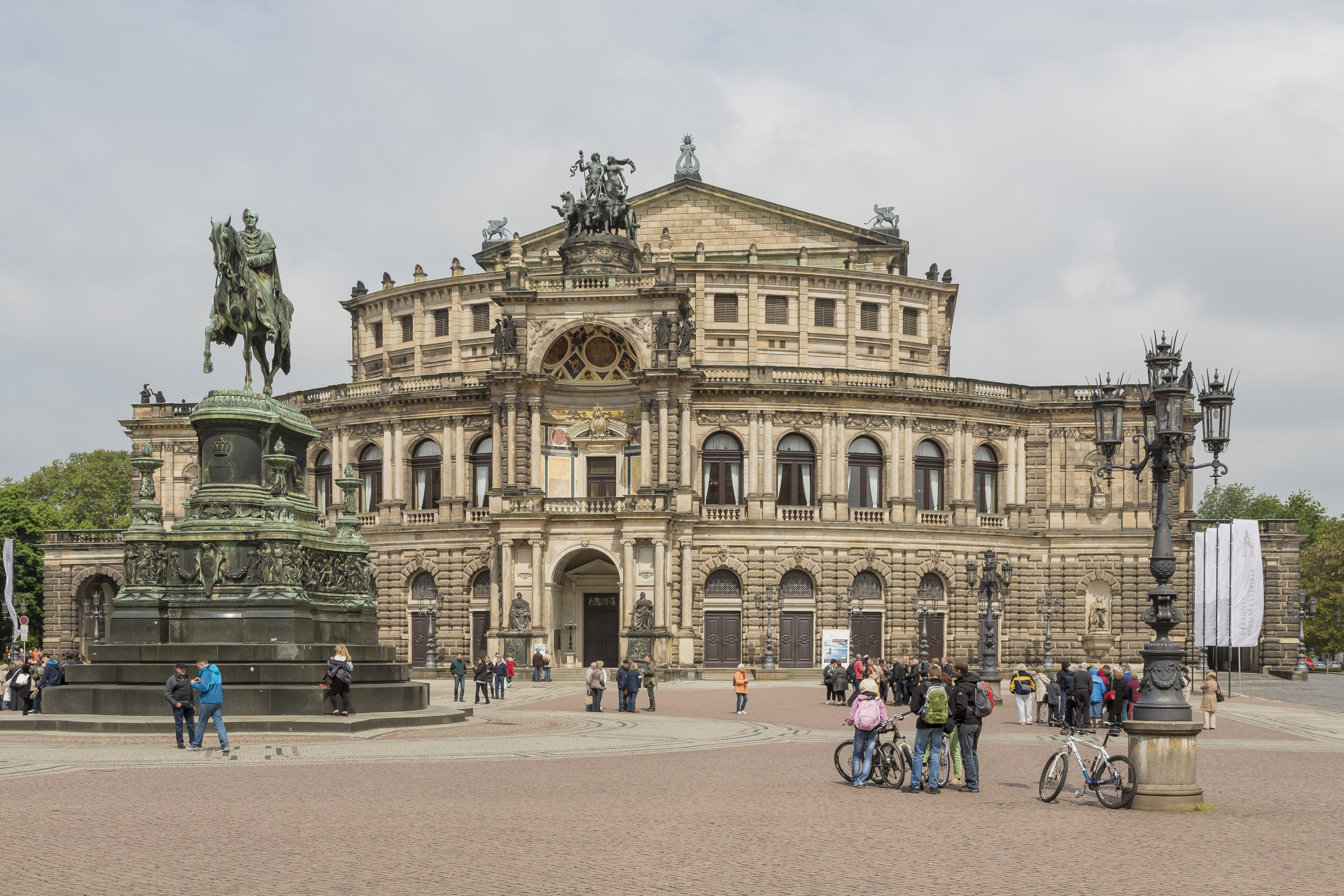
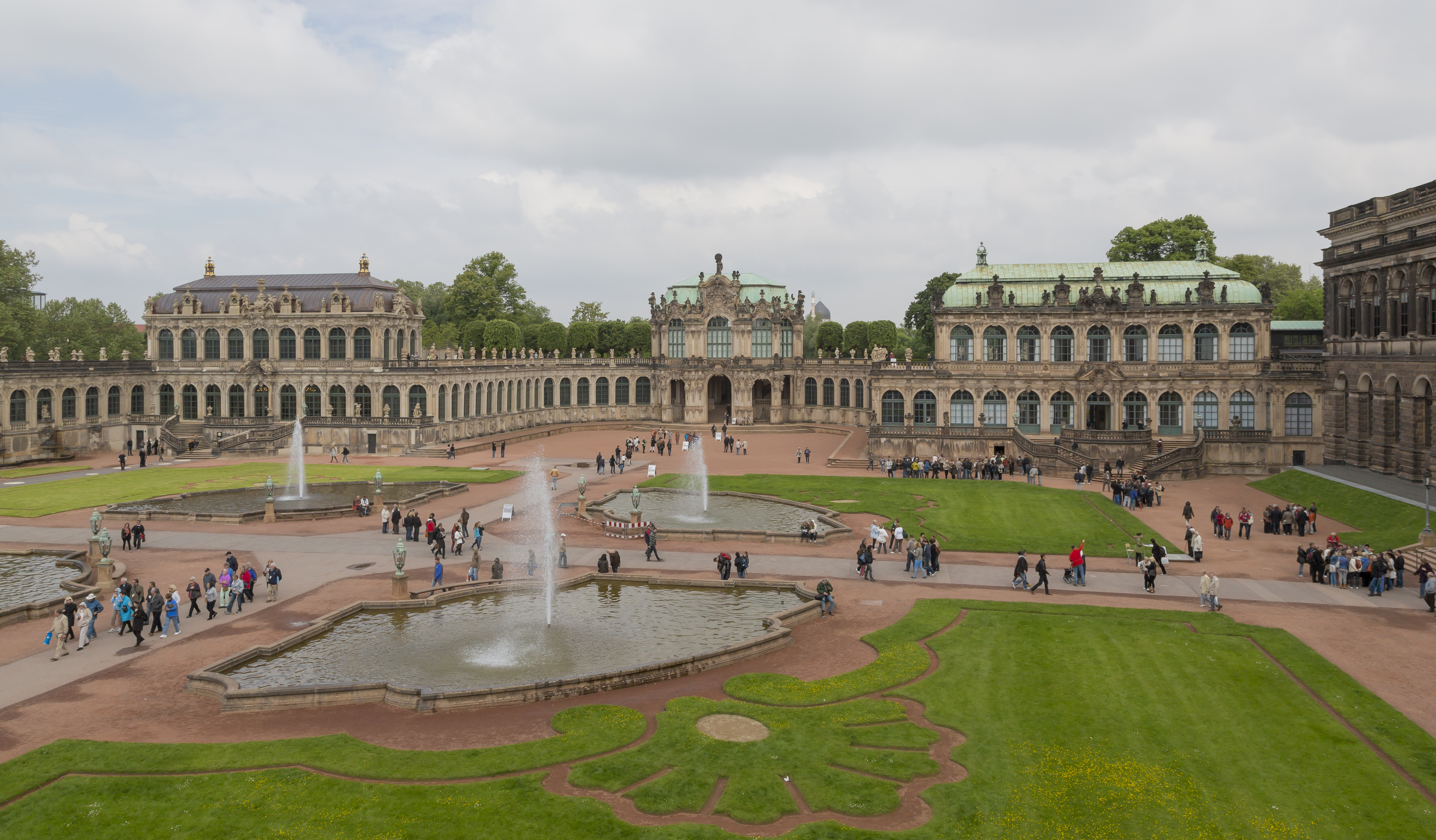
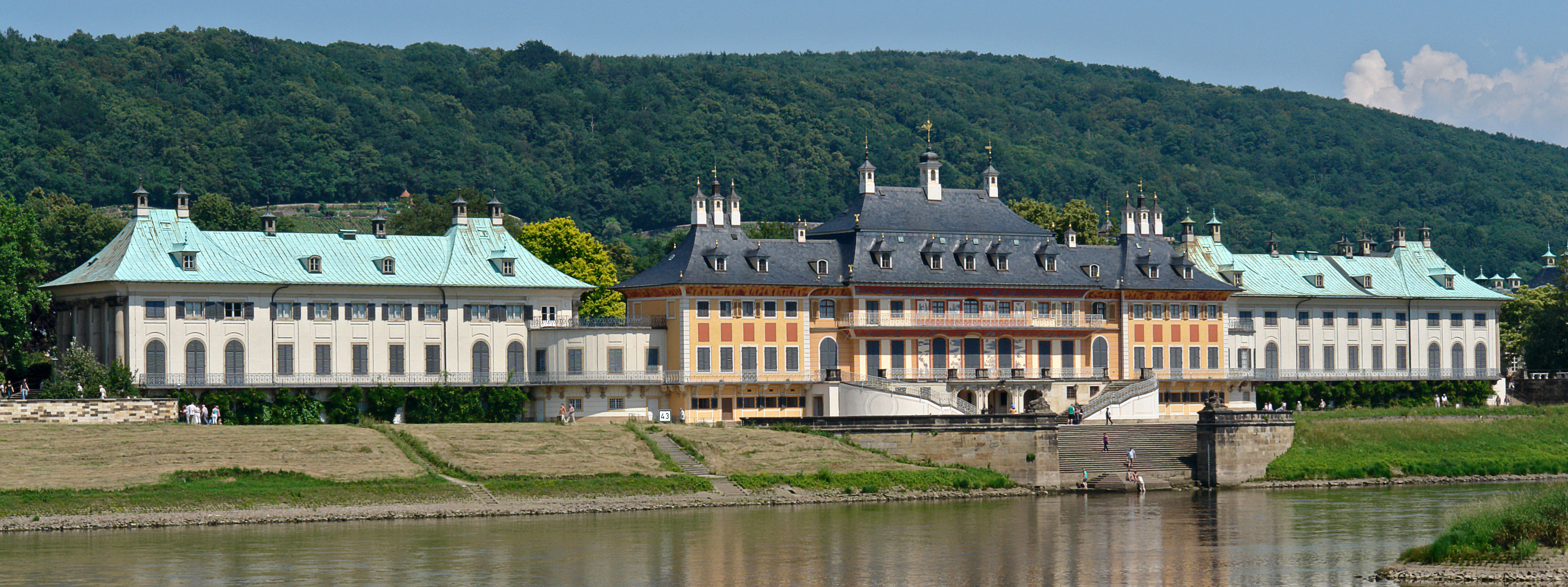
- Dresden skyline with Elbe River at dusk Frauenkirche Dresden Castle Semperoper Zwinger Pillnitz Palace

- Flag Coat of arms
- Interactive map of Dresden
- Location within Germany Location within Saxony
- Coordinates: 51°03′00″N 13°44′24″E
- Country: Germany
- State: Saxony
- District: Urban district

Government
  - Mayor (2022–29): Dirk Hilbert (FDP)

Area
  - City: 328.8 km^{2} (127.0 sq mi)
- Elevation: 113 m (371 ft)

Population (2025-12-31)
  - City: 562,764
  - Density: 1,712/km^{2} (4,433/sq mi)
  - Urban: 790,400
  - Metro: 1,343,305
- Time zone: UTC+01:00 (CET)
  - Summer (DST): UTC+02:00 (CEST)
- Vehicle registration: DD
- Website: dresden.de

Former UNESCO World Heritage Site
- Official name: Dresden Elbe Valley
- Type: Cultural
- Criteria: ii, iii, iv, v
- Designated: 2004 (28th session)
- Reference no.: 1156
- Region: Europe
- Delisted: 2009 (33rd session)

Dresden (/ˈdrɛzdən/ DREZ-den; German: [ˈdʁeːsdn̩]; Upper Saxon: Dräsdn; Upper Sorbian: Drježdźany, pronounced [ˈdʁʲɛʒdʒanɨ]) is the capital city of the German state of Saxony and its second most populous city after Leipzig. It is the 12th most populous city of Germany, and the third-most populous city in the area of former East Germany, after Berlin and Leipzig. Located on the Elbe River in the Dresden Basin, the city forms part of an urban area that includes the towns of Freital, Pirna, Radebeul, Coswig, Radeberg, and Heidenau with a combined population of over 780,000. The Dresden metropolitan area has over 1.3 million inhabitants.

First documented in 1206, Dresden developed into the principal residence of the Wettin rulers of Saxony from the late 15th century and later served as the capital of the Electorate of Saxony and the Kingdom of Saxony. The Electors and Kings of Saxony for centuries furnished the city with cultural and artistic splendor. The city was known as the Jewel Box, because of its Baroque and Rococo city centre. Following the abolition of the Saxon monarchy in 1918, Dresden remained the state capital. The controversial American and British bombing of Dresden towards the end of World War II killed approximately 25,000 people, most of whom were civilians, and destroyed large parts of the city centre.

After World War II, Dresden became part of the German Democratic Republic (East Germany), where it remained an industrial and research centre. Since German reunification in 1990, Dresden has once again become a cultural, educational and political centre of Germany. Extensive parts of the historic centre have been reconstructed. The Dresden University of Technology (TU Dresden) is one of the 10 largest universities in Germany and part of the German Universities Excellence Initiative. The economy of Dresden and its agglomeration is one of the most dynamic in Germany and ranks first in Saxony. It is dominated by high-tech branches, often called "Silicon Saxony".

Dresden is one of the most visited cities in Germany with 4.7 million overnight stays per year. Its most prominent building is the Frauenkirche located at the Neumarkt. Built in the 18th century, the church was destroyed during World War II. The remaining ruins were left for 50 years as a war memorial, before being rebuilt between 1994 and 2005. Other famous landmarks include the Zwinger, the Semperoper and Dresden Castle. Furthermore, the city is home to the Dresden State Art Collections, originating from the collections of the Saxon electors in the 16th century. Dresden's Striezelmarkt is one of the largest Christmas markets in Germany and is considered the first genuine Christmas market in the world. Nearby sights include the National Park of Saxon Switzerland, the Ore Mountains and the countryside around Elbe Valley, Moritzburg Castle and Meissen, home of Meissen porcelain.

== History ==
The area had been settled in the Neolithic era by Linear Pottery culture tribes c. 7500 BC. Dresden's founding and early growth is associated with the eastward expansion of Germanic peoples, mining in the nearby Ore Mountains, and the establishment of the Margraviate of Meissen. Its name comes from Sorbian Drežďany (meaning either "woods" or "lowland forest-dweller"). Dresden later evolved into the capital of Saxony. Beginning in the 17th century, it became one of Europe’s leading centres of culture and the arts.

=== Early history ===
Dresden developed as a German trading settlement on the south bank of the Elbe. It was first mentioned in a charter issued there by Margrave Dietrich of Meissen on 31 March 1206, recording his arbitration of a dispute between the bishop of Meissen and the burgrave of Dohna. A charter of 21 January 1216 first explicitly described Dresden as a town, using the phrase in civitate nostra dreseden ("in our town of Dresden"). In 1220, a stone bridge was constructed over the Elbe at the same location as today's Augustus Bridge. The bridge connected the town with a Sorbian settlement called Drezdany on the northern bank. It was known as Antiqua Dresdin by 1350, and later as Altendresden, both literally "old Dresden".

Dresden was given to Friedrich Clem after the death of Henry the Illustrious in 1288. It was taken by the Margraviate of Brandenburg in 1316 and was restored to the Wettin dynasty after the death of Valdemar the Great in 1319. In 1485, the Saxon Wettin brothers divided their lands under the Treaty of Leipzig, with Ernest retaining the Elector title and the western and northern territories, while Albert received the Meissen area and established Dresden as the capital of the Duchy of Saxony. Following the Schmalkaldic War, in 1547 Duke Moritz was granted the title of Elector and Dresden became the capital of the Electorate of Saxony.

=== Early modern age ===
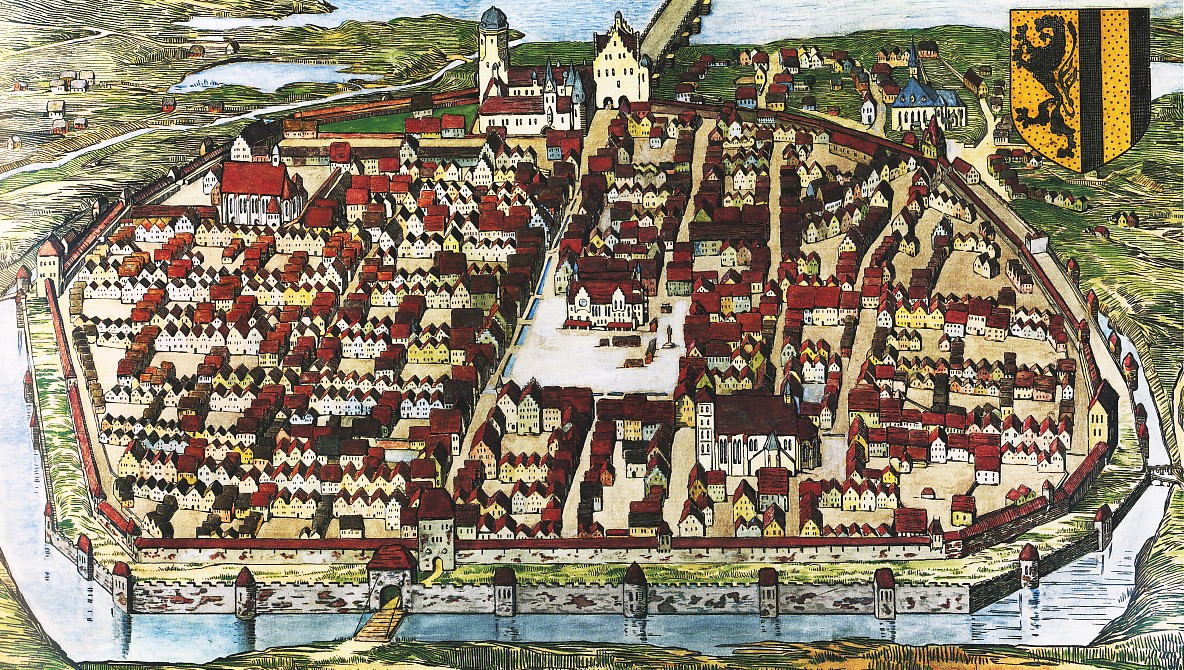
Dresden in 1521

Under the Saxon electors Frederick Augustus I of Saxony (1694–1733) and Frederick August II (1733–1763), Dresden developed into a major European centre of court culture, supported by their patronage of art, music and architecture. Both electors also ruled as kings of Poland and grand dukes of Lithuania during the Saxon-Polish personal union (1697–1763). Dresden remained their principal Saxon residence and attracted members of the Polish–Lithuanian political and cultural elites. Many of the city's Baroque landmarks were built during their reigns. These include the Zwinger Royal Palace, the Japanese Palace, the Taschenbergpalais, the Pillnitz Castle and the two landmark churches: the Catholic Hofkirche and the Lutheran Frauenkirche. In addition, significant art collections and museums were founded. Notable examples include the Dresden Porcelain Collection, the Collection of Prints, Drawings and Photographs, the Green Vault and the Mathematisch-Physikalischer Salon. To facilitate travel and correspondence between Dresden and Warsaw, a new postal and travel route via Poznań was laid out under Frederick August II in 1750. After his death in 1763, music collections and court records previously kept in Warsaw were transferred to Dresden and incorporated into its collections.

In 1726, there was a riot for two days after a Protestant clergyman was killed by a soldier who had recently converted from Catholicism. In 1745, the Treaty of Dresden between Prussia, Saxony, and Austria ended the Second Silesian War. Only a few years later, Dresden suffered heavy destruction in the Seven Years' War (1756–1763), following its capture by Prussian forces, its subsequent re-capture, and a failed Prussian siege in 1760. Friedrich Schiller completed his Ode to Joy (the literary base of the European anthem) in Dresden in 1785. In 1793, preparations for the Polish Kościuszko Uprising started in the city by Tadeusz Kościuszko in response to the Second Partition of Poland.

=== 19th century ===
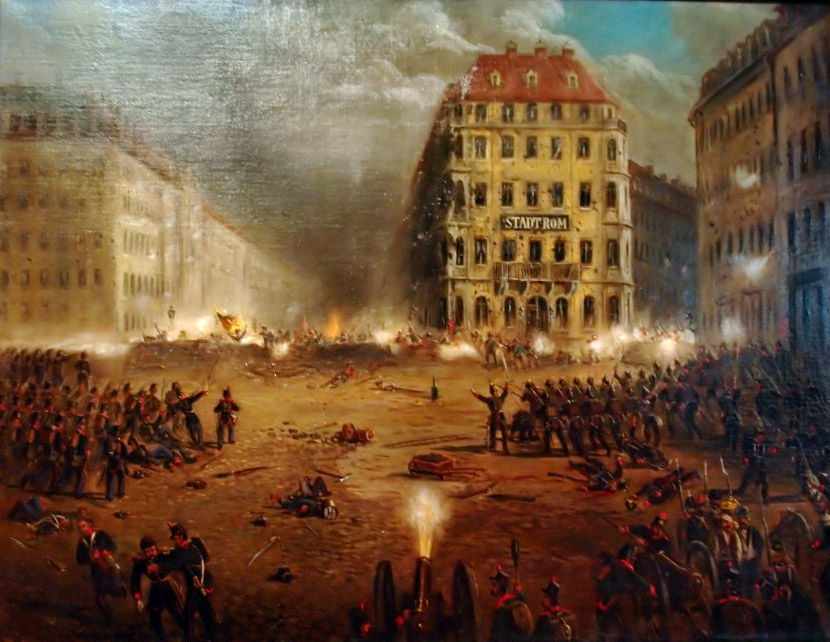
The May Uprising in Dresden in 1849

In 1806, Dresden became the capital of the Kingdom of Saxony established by Napoleon. During the Napoleonic Wars the French Emperor made it a base of operations, winning there the Battle of Dresden on 27 August 1813. As a result of the Congress of Vienna, the Kingdom of Saxony became part of the German Confederation in 1815.

In 1828, the Technical School was founded, the predecessor of the present-day TU Dresden (Dresden University of Technology). In 1838, the Dresden Coinage Convention took place in the city which attempted to bring some degree of standardisation to the currencies used in the Zollverein (German Customs Union). Steamboat transport on the Elbe was established in 1837, followed in 1839 by the opening of Dresden’s first railway, providing a direct connection to Leipzig.

Dresden was a centre of the German Revolutions in 1848–1849. The May Uprising saw rebel Saxon troops supported by students, democrats, miners, and workers declaring a provisional government at the Town Hall. During the street fighting the city’s first opera house was destroyed. Prussian forces, aided by loyal Saxon troops, suppressed the revolt, leaving over 150 dead and many imprisoned. The uprising forced Frederick Augustus II of Saxony to flee from Dresden, but he soon after regained control over the city with the help of Prussia.

In 1852, the population of Dresden grew to 100,000 inhabitants, making it one of the biggest cities within the German Confederation. Following the Polish uprisings of 1831, 1848 and 1863, many Poles fled to Dresden, including the artistic and political elite, such as composer Frédéric Chopin, war hero Józef Bem and writer Adam Mickiewicz. Mickiewicz wrote one of his greatest works, Dziady, Part III, there.

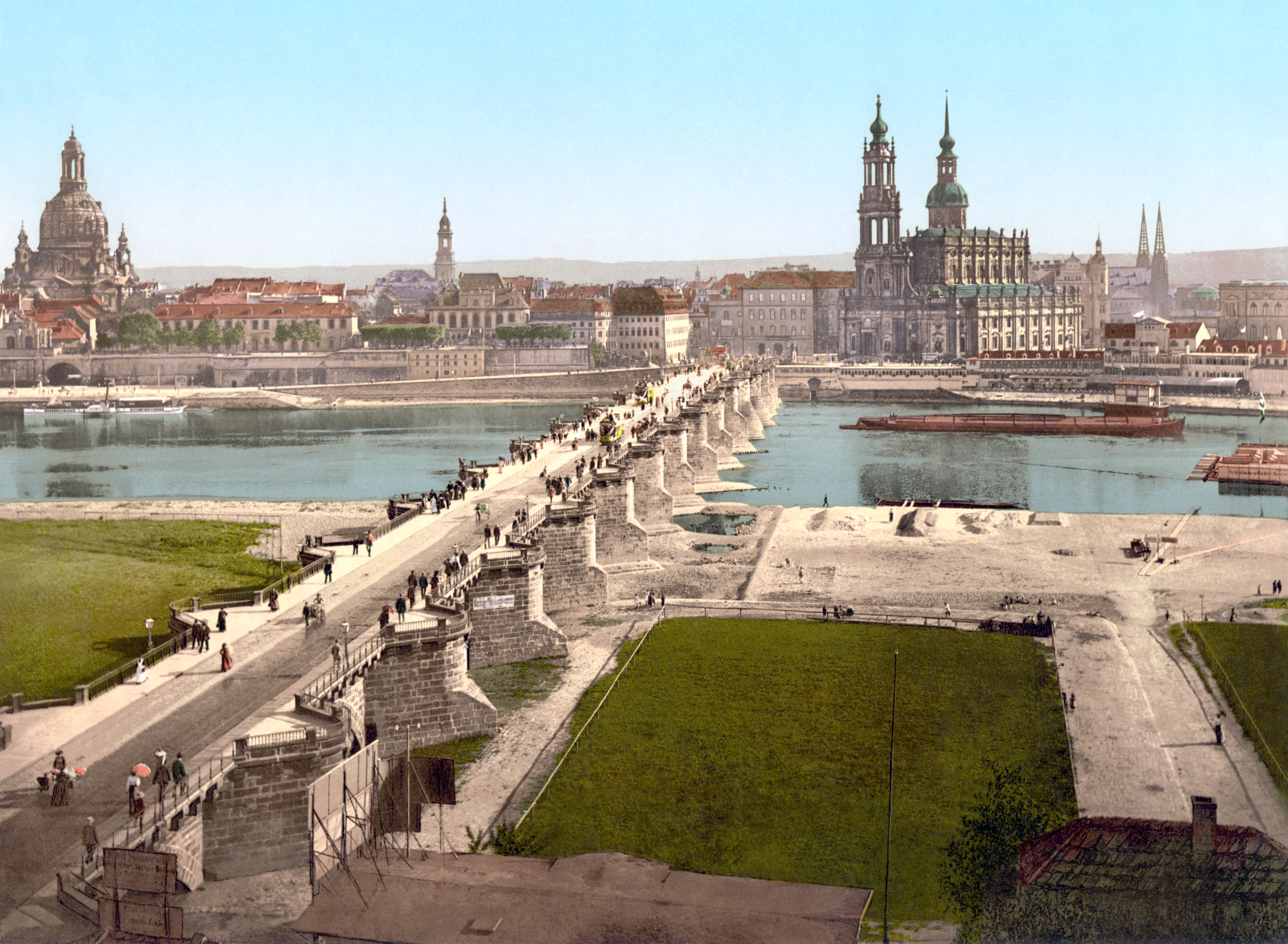
Dresden during the 1890s. Landmarks include Dresden Frauenkirche, Augustus Bridge, and Katholische Hofkirche.

As the capital of the Kingdom of Saxony, Dresden became part of the newly founded German Empire in 1871. In the following years, the city became a major centre of economy, including motor car production, food processing, banking and the manufacture of medical equipment. The Dresdner Bank was founded in the city in 1872. In the 1870s, Albertstadt, a large military facility, was built.

=== 20th century ===
In the early 20th century, Dresden was particularly well known for its camera works and its cigarette factories. During World War I, the city did not suffer any war damage, but lost many of its inhabitants.

Following the November Revolution of 1918, a workers' and soldiers' council proclaimed a republic in Dresden on 10 November. The city remained the capital of the newly established Free State of Saxony, which adopted a democratic constitution in 1920. Political conflicts between Social Democrats, Communists and their opponents intensified during the early years of the republic. In 1923, the Reichswehr intervened in Saxony following the inclusion of Communist ministers in the state government, forcing the resignation of Minister-President Erich Zeigner.

Dresden remained an important industrial centre, particularly in photographic and optical equipment. In 1926, several camera manufacturers merged to form Zeiss Ikon, headquartered in the city. The interwar period also saw the construction of new residential districts and public buildings, with architectural developments influenced by New Objectivity.

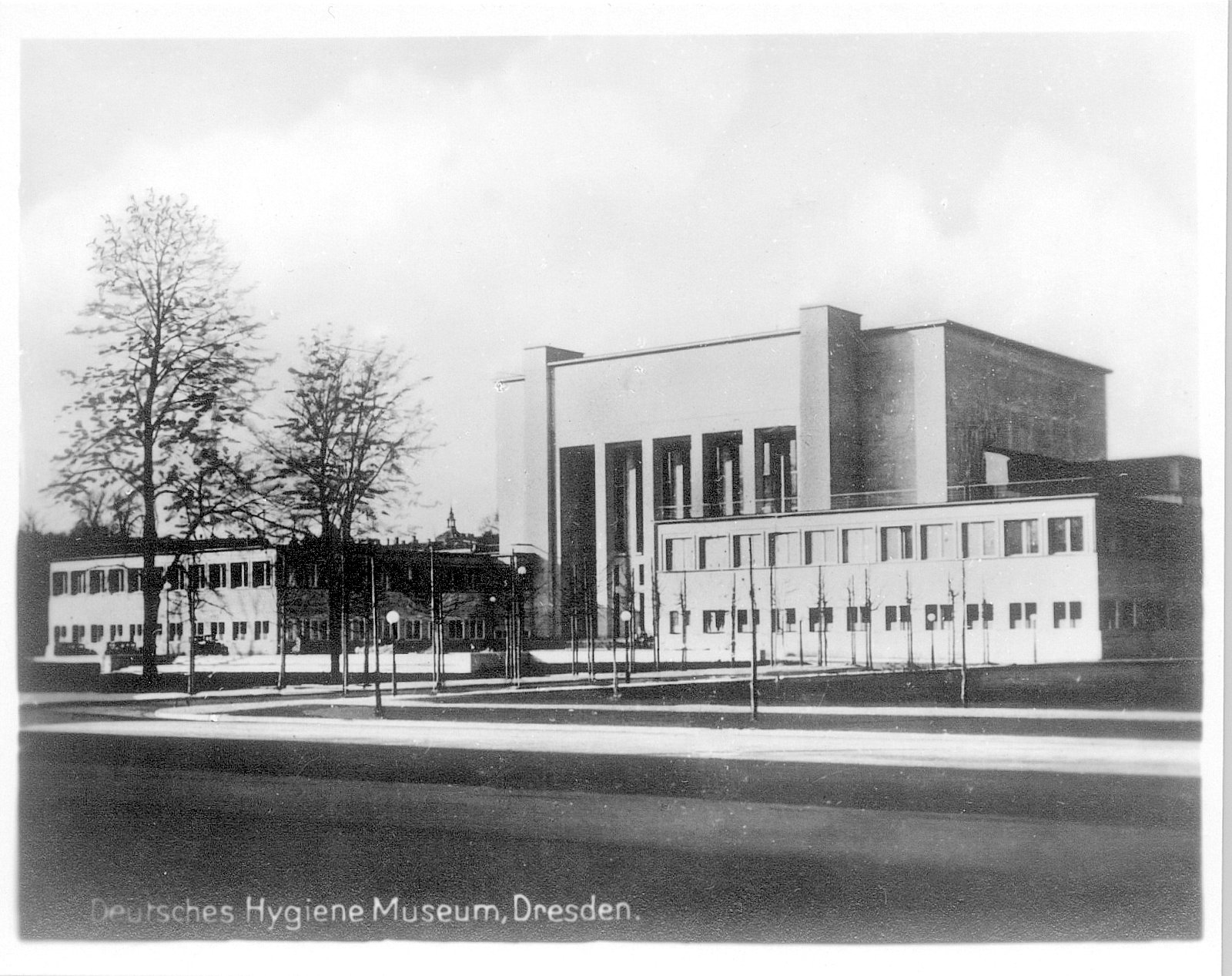
The German Hygiene Museum in Dresden, c. 1930

In the arts, the Dresden Secession (Dresdner Sezession – Gruppe 1919), founded by Conrad Felixmüller in January 1919, brought together Expressionist artists including Otto Dix and Lasar Segall. Modern dance also developed in the city; Gret Palucca established her dance school in 1925. In 1930, the German Hygiene Museum opened its new building designed by Wilhelm Kreis, reflecting contemporary approaches to architecture and public education. The Great Depression brought rising unemployment and intensified political divisions in Saxony, where the Nazi Party gained substantial electoral support from 1930 onwards.

After the Nazi seizure of power, two book burnings were organised in the city in 1933, one by the SA on Wettiner Platz, the second one by German Student Union at the Bismarck Column on Räcknitzhöhe.

From 1933 to 1945, the Jewish community of Dresden was reduced from over 6,000 (7,100 people were persecuted as Jews) to 41, mostly as a result of emigration, but later also deportation and murder. The Semper Synagogue was destroyed in November 1938 on Kristallnacht.

==== Second World War ====
During World War II, Dresden was the location of several forced labour subcamps of the Stalag IV-A prisoner-of-war camp for Allied POWs, and seven subcamps of the Flossenbürg concentration camp, in which some 3,600 men, women and children were imprisoned, mostly Polish, Jewish and Russian. In April 1945, most surviving prisoners were sent on death marches to various destinations in Saxony and German-occupied Czechoslovakia, whereas some women were probably murdered and some managed to escape. Over 1,300 people were executed by the Nazis at the Münchner Platz, a courthouse in Dresden, including labour leaders, undesirables, and resistance fighters. Around two-thirds of the executed individuals originated from the Protectorate of Bohemia and Moravia.

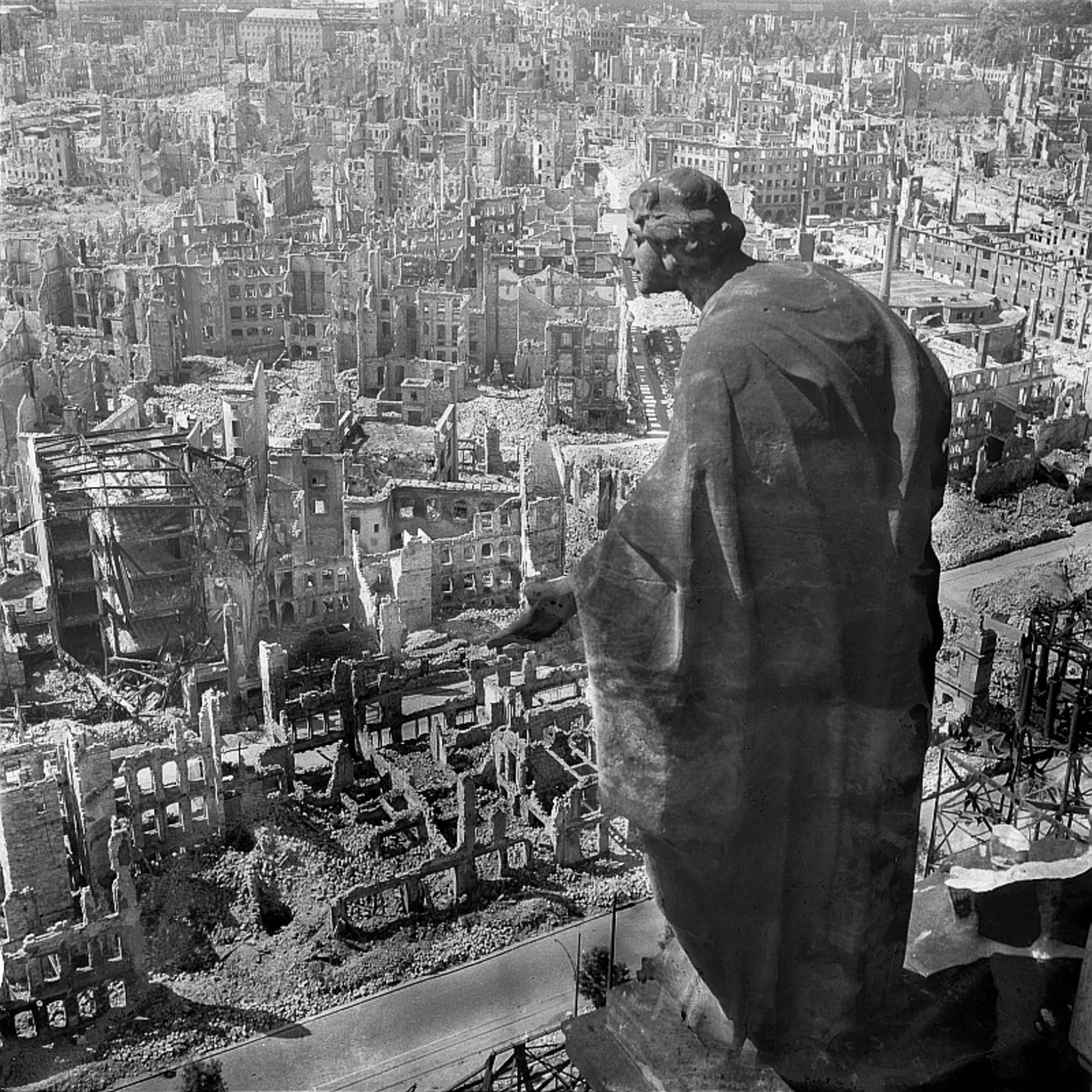
The ruins of Dresden in 1945. Facing south from the town hall (Rathaus) tower. Statue Güte (Good or Kindness) by August Schreitmüller, 1908–1910.

Dresden in the 20th century was a major communications hub and manufacturing centre with 127 factories and major workshops and was designated by the German military as a defensive strongpoint, with which to hinder the Soviet advance. During the final months of the war, the city, in addition to its roughly 600,000 inhabitants, harboured some 300,000 refugees who had fled the Red Army's advance into Silesia.

Dresden was attacked seven times between 1944 and 1945. The bombing of Dresden by the Royal Air Force (RAF) and the United States Army Air Forces (USAAF) between 13 and 15 February 1945 was controversial. On the night of 13–14 February 1945, 773 RAF Lancaster bombers dropped 1,181.6 tons of incendiary bombs and 1,477.7 tons of high explosive bombs. The inner city of Dresden was largely destroyed. The Dresden Historians' Commission, made up of 13 prominent German historians, in an official 2010 report concluded that casualties numbered between 22,500 and 25,000.

The Allies described the operation as the legitimate bombing of a military and industrial target. Several researchers have argued that the February attacks were disproportionate. As a result of the bombings, mostly women and children died. The Albertstadt garrison was not specifically targeted.

==== Post-war ====
After the war, Dresden became part of the Soviet occupation zone in Germany. The damage from Allied air raids was so extensive that a narrow-gauge light railway system was constructed to remove the debris. This seven-line railway system employed 5,000 staff and 40 locomotives. The last train remained in service until 1958, though the last debris clearance team was only disbanded in 1977.

Dresden became a major industrial centre of the German Democratic Republic (East Germany), with a great deal of research infrastructure. It was the centre of Bezirk Dresden (Dresden District) between 1952 and 1990.

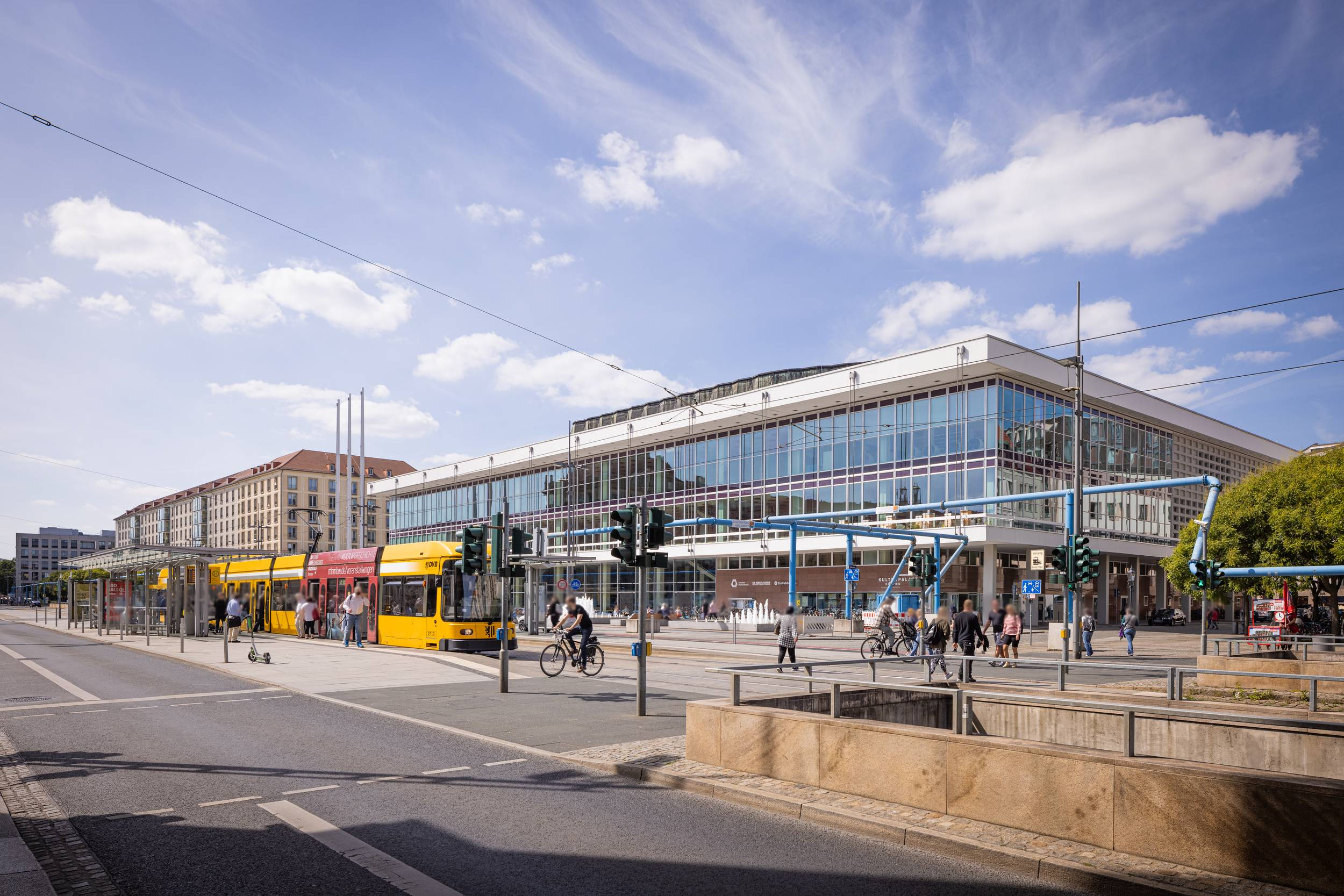
The Kulturpalast, completed in 1969, is a prominent example of socialist modernist architecture of the GDR era.

The East German authorities razed the ruins of many churches and palaces in the 1950s and 1960s (such as the Gothic Sophienkirche and the Wackerbarth-Palais) and rebuilt much of the city in a "socialist modern" style for economic reasons and to break with its past as a royal capital and bourgeois stronghold. Buildings of socialist classicism and spatial design and orientation according to socialist ideals (e.g. the Kulturpalast) were built at the Altmarkt. Large prefabricated housing estates were built on previously undeveloped land in Prohlis and Gorbitz. Damaged housing in the Johannstadt and other areas around the city centre were demolished and replaced with apartment blocks. The Äußere Neustadt (Outer New Town) as well as the villa districts in Blasewitz, Striesen, Kleinzschachwitz, Loschwitz and Weißer Hirsch were largely preserved.

Some historic landmarks were saved or reconstructed. Among them were the Ständehaus (1946), the Augustus Bridge (1949), the Kreuzkirche (1955), the Zwinger (1963), the Dresden Cathedral (1965), the Semperoper (1985), the Japanese Palace (1987) and the two largest train stations. The ruins of the Frauenkirche were allowed to remain as a war memorial.

From 1955 to 1958, a large part of the art treasures looted by the Soviet Union was returned, which meant that from 1960 onwards many state art collections could be opened in reconstructed facilities or interim exhibitions.

Until the end of the Cold War, the 1st Guards Tank Army of the Soviet Army and the 7th Panzer Division of the National People's Army (NVA) were stationed in and around Dresden. From 1985 to 1990, the future President of Russia, Vladimir Putin, was stationed in Dresden by the KGB.

On 3 October 1989, a convoy of trains carrying East German refugees from Prague passed through Dresden on its way to West Germany. Local activists and residents joined the growing civil disobedience movement spreading across the GDR by staging demonstrations and demanding the removal of the communist government.

=== Post-reunification ===
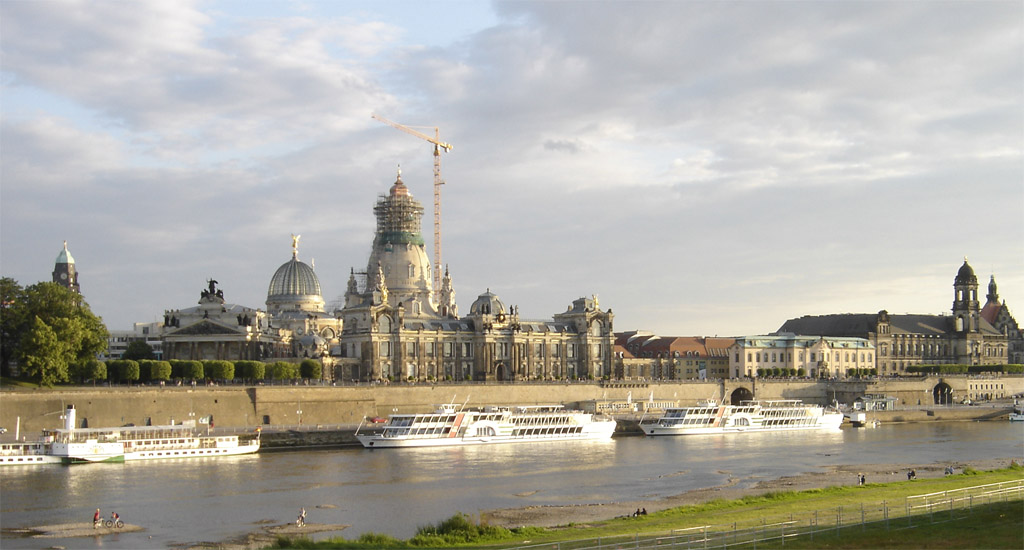
Reconstruction of the Frauenkirche in 2004

Following German reunification, the Free State of Saxony was re-established with expanded borders and Dresden as its capital in 1990. The Soviet troops stationed in the city were withdrawn in the early 1990s and the NVA dissolved in accordance with the Two-Plus-Four Treaty of 1990.

Since reunification, Dresden has undergone significant reconstruction. Restoration of the Dresden Frauenkirche began in 1994 and was completed in 2005 – a year before Dresden's 800th anniversary – with the help of privately raised funds. The gold cross on the top of the church was made in London and funded by donations to the Dresden Trust, a British organisation committed to strengthening relations with Dresden. The reconstruction of the Frauenkirche marked the first step in rebuilding the Neumarkt area. The majority of buildings around the square were rebuilt either in their original form or with a façade resembling the original.

Each year on 13 February, the anniversary of the British and American fire-bombing raid, thousands of residents gather to commemorate the city's destruction in World War II. Since reunification, the ceremony has taken on a more neutral and pacifist tone (after being used more politically during the Cold War). Beginning in 1999, Neo-Nazi groups have organised demonstrations in Dresden that have been among the largest of their type in the post-war history of Germany.

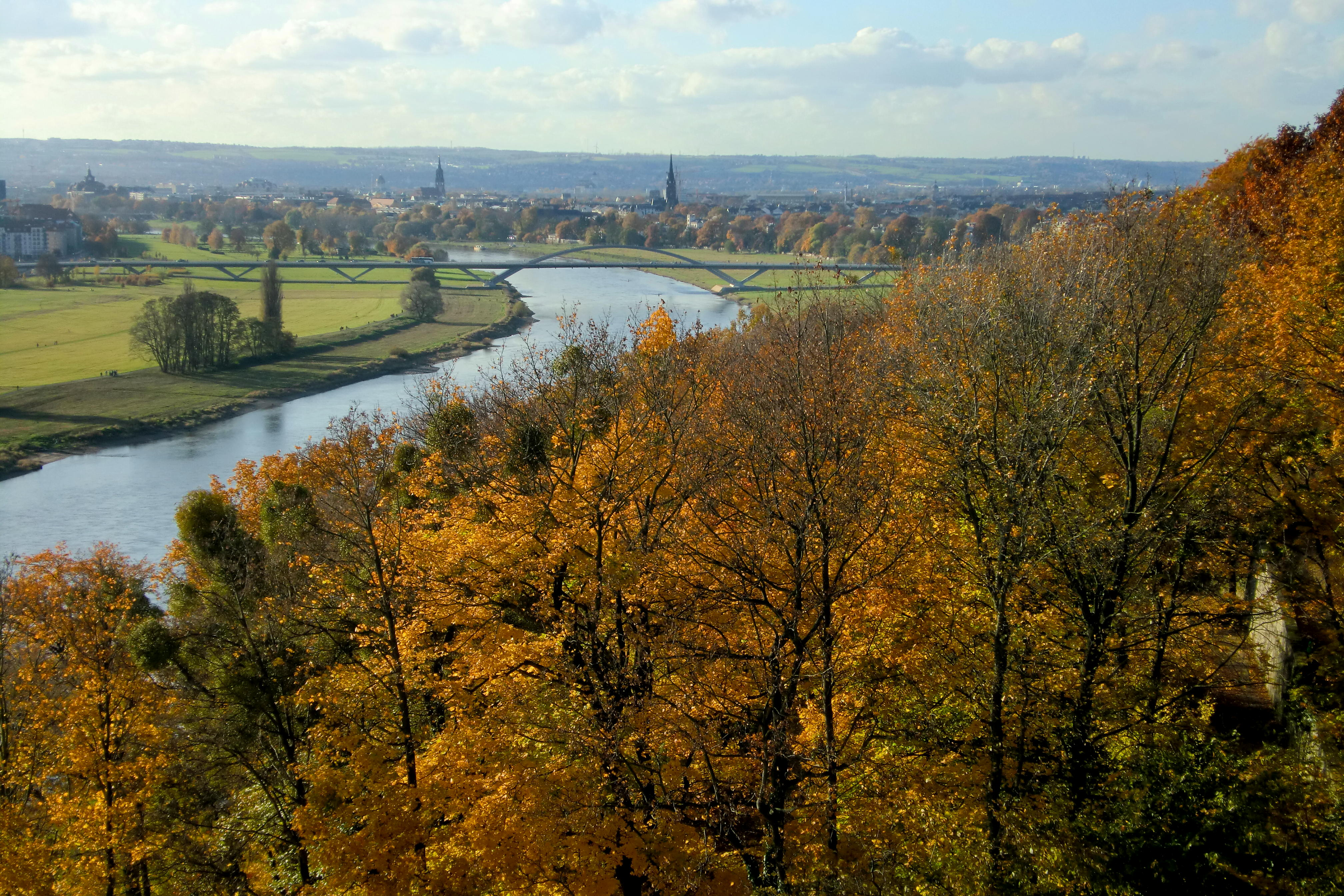
Dresden Elbe Valley with the Waldschlösschen Bridge. Its construction led to the site losing its UNESCO World Heritage status in 2009.

In 2002, torrential rains caused the Elbe to flood 9 metres (30 ft) above its normal height, i.e., even higher than the old record height from 1845, damaging many landmarks (see 2002 European floods).

UNESCO declared the Dresden Elbe Valley to be a World Heritage Site in 2004. After being placed on the list of endangered World Heritage Sites in 2006, the city lost the title in June 2009, due to the construction of the Waldschlösschen Bridge, making it the second ever World Heritage Site to be removed from the list. UNESCO stated in 2006 that the bridge would destroy the cultural landscape. The city council's legal moves, meant to prevent the bridge from being built, failed.

In 2006, the city of Dresden sold its publicly subsidized housing organisation, WOBA Dresden GmbH, to the US-based private investment company Fortress Investment Group. The city received 987.1 million euro and paid off its remaining loans, making it the first large city in Germany to become debt-free. Opponents of the sale were concerned about Dresden's loss of control over the subsidized housing market.

== Geography ==
=== Location ===
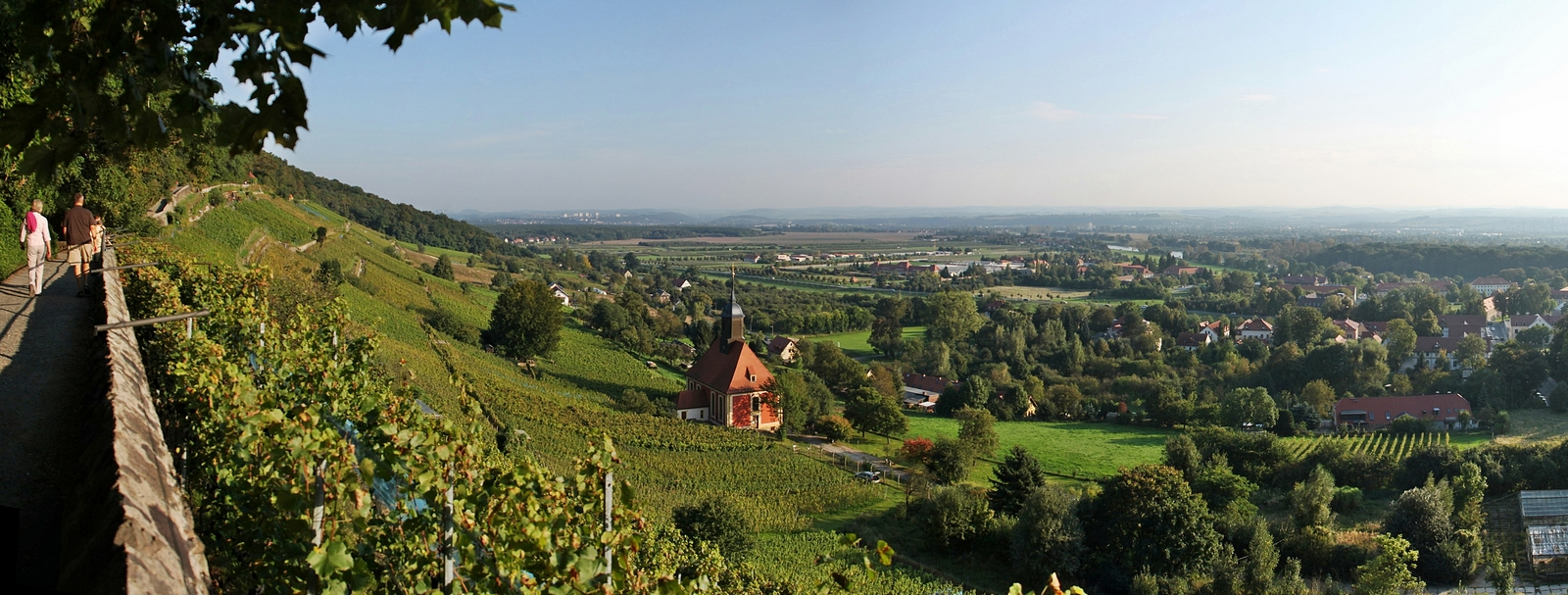
View over Dresden Basin

Dresden lies on both banks of the Elbe, mostly in the Dresden Basin, with the further reaches of the eastern Ore Mountains to the south, the steep slope of the Lusatian granitic crust to the north, and the Elbe Sandstone Mountains to the east at an altitude of about 113 metres (371 feet). Triebenberg is the highest point in Dresden at 384 metres (1,260 feet).

With a location and a mild climate on the Elbe, as well as Baroque-style architecture and numerous museums and art collections, Dresden has been called "Elbflorenz" (Florence on the Elbe). The incorporation of neighbouring rural communities over the past 60 years has made Dresden the fourth largest urban district by area in Germany after Berlin, Hamburg and Cologne.

The nearest German cities are Chemnitz 62 kilometres (39 miles) to the southwest, Leipzig 100 kilometres (62 miles) to the northwest and Berlin 165 kilometres (103 miles) to the north. Prague (Czech Republic) is about 150 kilometres (93 miles) to the south and Wrocław (Poland) 200 kilometres (120 miles) to the east.

=== Nature ===
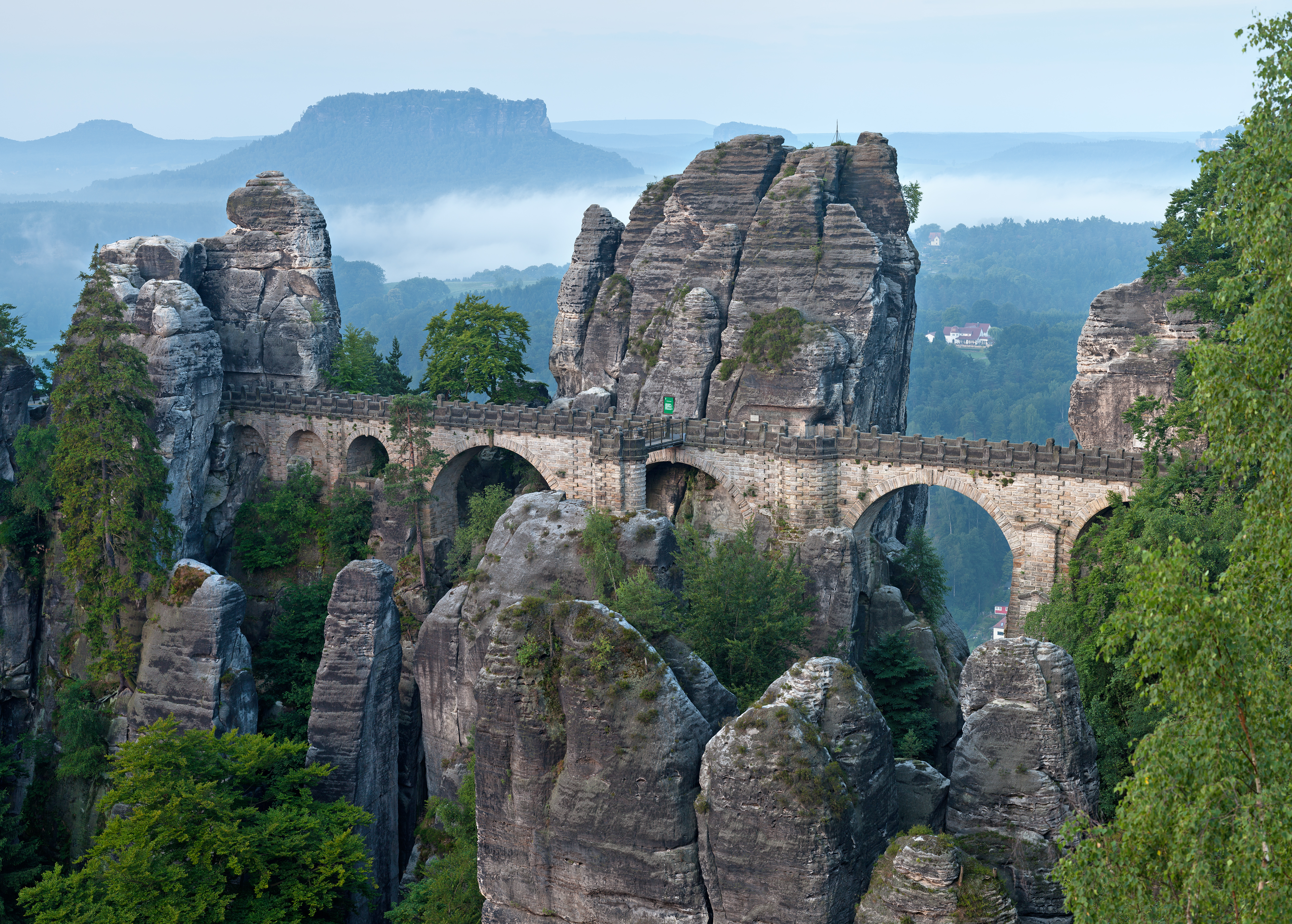
Saxon Switzerland a few kilometres outside of Dresden

Dresden is one of the greenest cities in all of Europe, with 62% of the city being green areas and forests. The Dresden Heath (Dresdner Heide) to the north is a forest 50 km^{2} (19 sq mi) in size. There are four nature reserves. The additional Special Conservation Areas cover 18 km^{2} (6.9 sq mi). The protected gardens, parkways, parks and old graveyards host 110 natural monuments in the city. The Dresden Elbe Valley is a former world heritage site which is focused on the conservation of the cultural landscape in Dresden. One important part of that landscape is the Elbe meadows, which cross the city in a 20 kilometre swath. Saxon Switzerland is located south-east of the city.

=== Climate ===
Like most of eastern Germany, Dresden has an oceanic climate (Köppen climate classification Cfb), with significant continental influences due to its inland location. The summers are warm, averaging 19.0 °C (66.2 °F) in July. The winters are slightly colder than the German average, with a January average temperature of 0.1 °C (32.18 °F). The driest months are February, March and April, with precipitation of around 40 mm (1.6 in). The wettest months are July and August, with more than 80 mm (3.1 in) per month.

The microclimate in the Elbe valley differs from that on the slopes and in the higher areas, where the Dresden district Klotzsche, at 227 metres above sea level, hosts the Dresden weather station. The weather in Klotzsche is 1 to 3 °C (1.8 to 5.4 °F) colder than in the inner city at 112 metres above sea level.

Climate data for Dresden (1971–2000 normals)
Month	Jan	Feb	Mar	Apr	May	Jun	Jul	Aug	Sep	Oct	Nov	Dec	Year
Mean daily maximum °C (°F)	2.7 (36.9)	4.1 (39.4)	8.4 (47.1)	12.9 (55.2)	18.7 (65.7)	21.3 (70.3)	23.6 (74.5)	23.7 (74.7)	18.8 (65.8)	13.5 (56.3)	6.9 (44.4)	4.0 (39.2)	13.2 (55.8)
Mean daily minimum °C (°F)	−2.2 (28.0)	−1.8 (28.8)	1.3 (34.3)	3.9 (39.0)	8.6 (47.5)	11.8 (53.2)	13.7 (56.7)	13.6 (56.5)	10.4 (50.7)	6.4 (43.5)	1.9 (35.4)	−0.6 (30.9)	5.6 (42.0)
Average precipitation mm (inches)	44.3 (1.74)	34.9 (1.37)	43.1 (1.70)	47.3 (1.86)	60.0 (2.36)	68.5 (2.70)	82.0 (3.23)	77.9 (3.07)	49.6 (1.95)	44.5 (1.75)	53.5 (2.11)	56.9 (2.24)	662.5 (26.08)
Average precipitation days	9.8	8.9	8.8	9.3	8.6	10.5	10.3	9.2	8.3	8.2	10.6	11.1	113.6
Source: WMO

Climate data for Dresden (1991–2020 normals, extremes 1934–present)
Month	Jan	Feb	Mar	Apr	May	Jun	Jul	Aug	Sep	Oct	Nov	Dec	Year
Record high °C (°F)	16.8 (62.2)	20.0 (68.0)	24.4 (75.9)	29.5 (85.1)	31.7 (89.1)	38.2 (100.8)	36.4 (97.5)	37.4 (99.3)	33.9 (93.0)	27.8 (82.0)	19.5 (67.1)	17.7 (63.9)	38.2 (100.8)
Mean daily maximum °C (°F)	3.0 (37.4)	4.5 (40.1)	8.5 (47.3)	14.3 (57.7)	18.8 (65.8)	22.2 (72.0)	24.5 (76.1)	24.2 (75.6)	19.1 (66.4)	13.5 (56.3)	7.6 (45.7)	4.1 (39.4)	13.7 (56.7)
Daily mean °C (°F)	0.6 (33.1)	1.5 (34.7)	4.7 (40.5)	9.7 (49.5)	14.0 (57.2)	17.3 (63.1)	19.4 (66.9)	19.1 (66.4)	14.6 (58.3)	9.8 (49.6)	5.0 (41.0)	1.7 (35.1)	9.8 (49.6)
Mean daily minimum °C (°F)	−2.0 (28.4)	−1.5 (29.3)	1.1 (34.0)	4.8 (40.6)	8.9 (48.0)	12.3 (54.1)	14.3 (57.7)	14.1 (57.4)	10.4 (50.7)	6.5 (43.7)	2.4 (36.3)	−0.7 (30.7)	5.9 (42.6)
Record low °C (°F)	−25.3 (−13.5)	−23.0 (−9.4)	−16.5 (2.3)	−6.3 (20.7)	−3.4 (25.9)	0.9 (33.6)	6.1 (43.0)	5.4 (41.7)	0.0 (32.0)	−6.0 (21.2)	−13.2 (8.2)	−21.0 (−5.8)	−25.3 (−13.5)
Average precipitation mm (inches)	42.1 (1.66)	32.7 (1.29)	42.1 (1.66)	36.3 (1.43)	62.9 (2.48)	62.6 (2.46)	84.5 (3.33)	80.1 (3.15)	51.7 (2.04)	49.9 (1.96)	47.5 (1.87)	44.0 (1.73)	636.4 (25.06)
Average precipitation days (≥ 0.1 mm)	17.4	14.4	15.1	11.4	13.7	13.5	14.6	12.7	11.9	14.0	14.7	16.1	169.4
Average snowy days (≥ 1.0 cm)	12.1	9.8	4.5	0.6	0	0	0	0	0	0.1	2.2	6.4	35.7
Average relative humidity (%)	82.6	78.7	74.4	67.0	67.9	68.5	67.1	67.8	74.9	79.8	84.3	83.7	74.7
Mean monthly sunshine hours	62.0	82.1	127.0	187.3	222.0	221.3	233.8	222.8	164.2	119.9	67.9	60.0	1,770.4
Source 1: NOAA
Source 2: Data derived from Deutscher Wetterdienst (precipitation (Klotzsche))

=== Flood protection ===
Because of its location on the banks of the Elbe, into which some water sources from the Ore Mountains flow, flood protection is important. Large areas are kept free of buildings to provide a flood plain. Two additional trenches, about 50 metres wide, have been built to keep the inner city free of water from the Elbe, by dissipating the water downstream through the inner city's gorge portion. Flood regulation systems like detention basins and water reservoirs are almost all outside the city area.

The Weißeritz, normally a rather small river, suddenly ran directly into the main station of Dresden during the 2002 European floods. This was largely because the river returned to its former route; it had been diverted so that a railway could run along the river bed.

Many locations and areas need to be protected by walls and sheet pilings during floods. A number of districts become waterlogged if the Elbe overflows across some of its former floodplains.

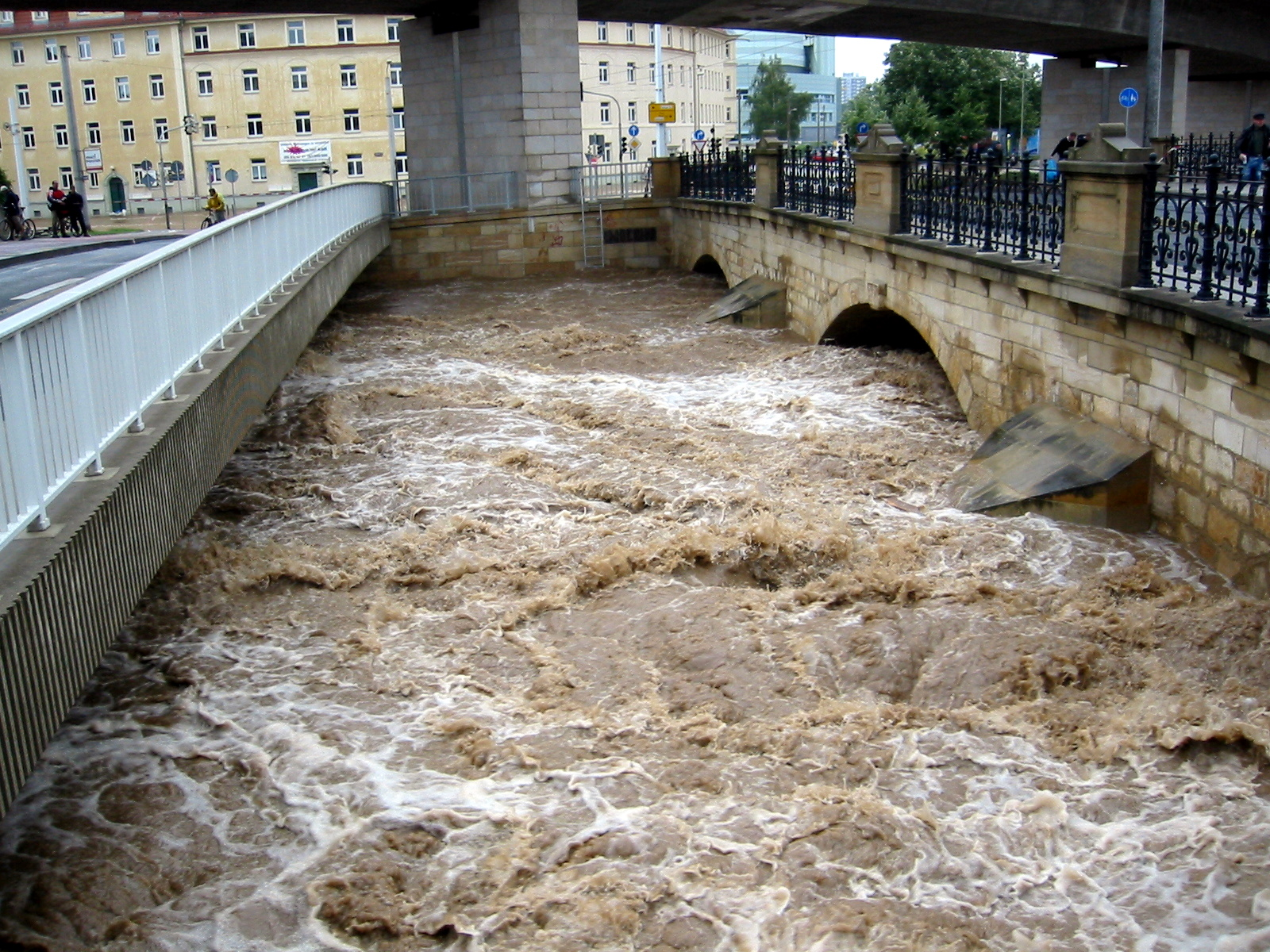
Floods in 2002

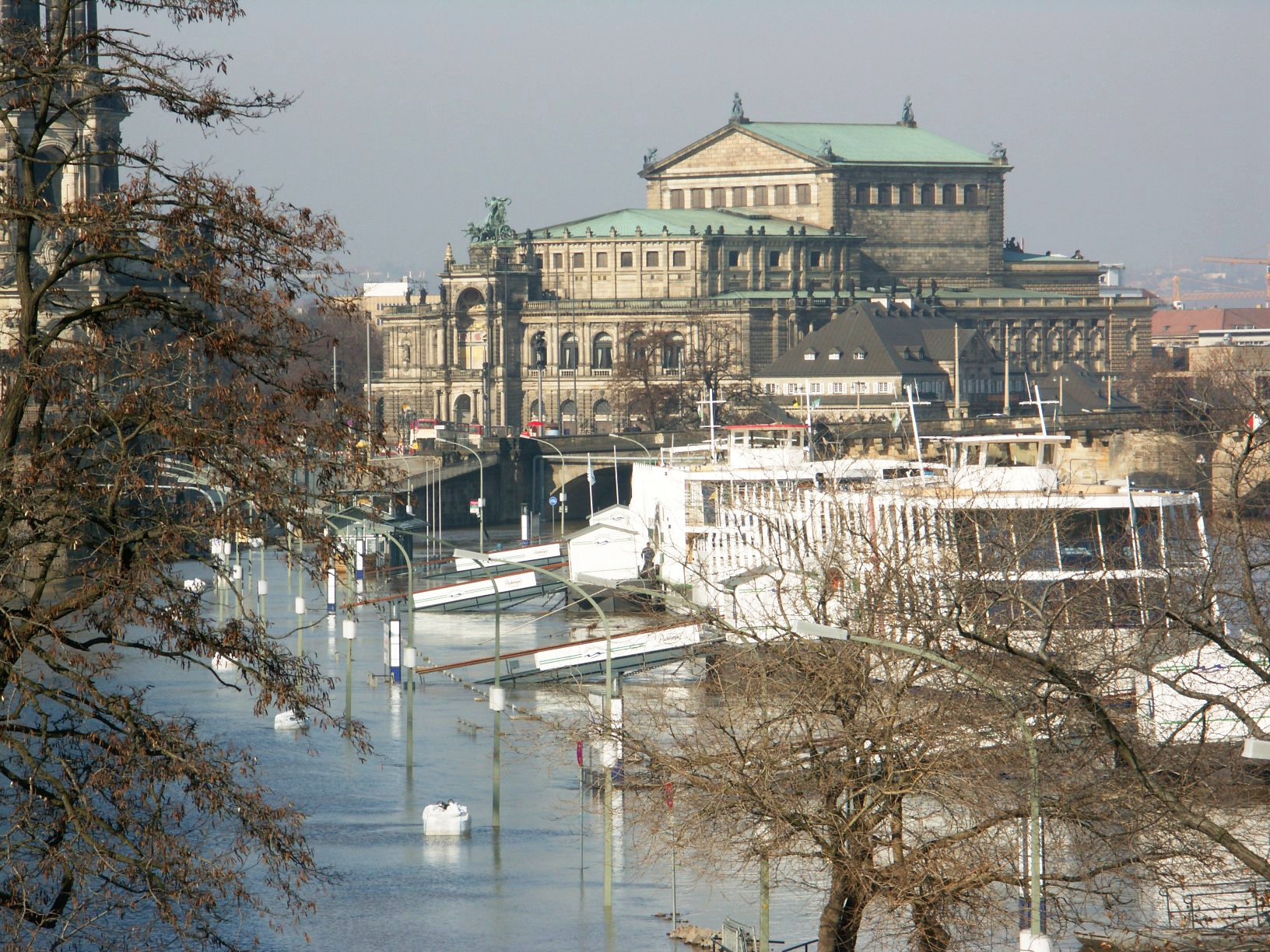
Semperoper during 2005 floods

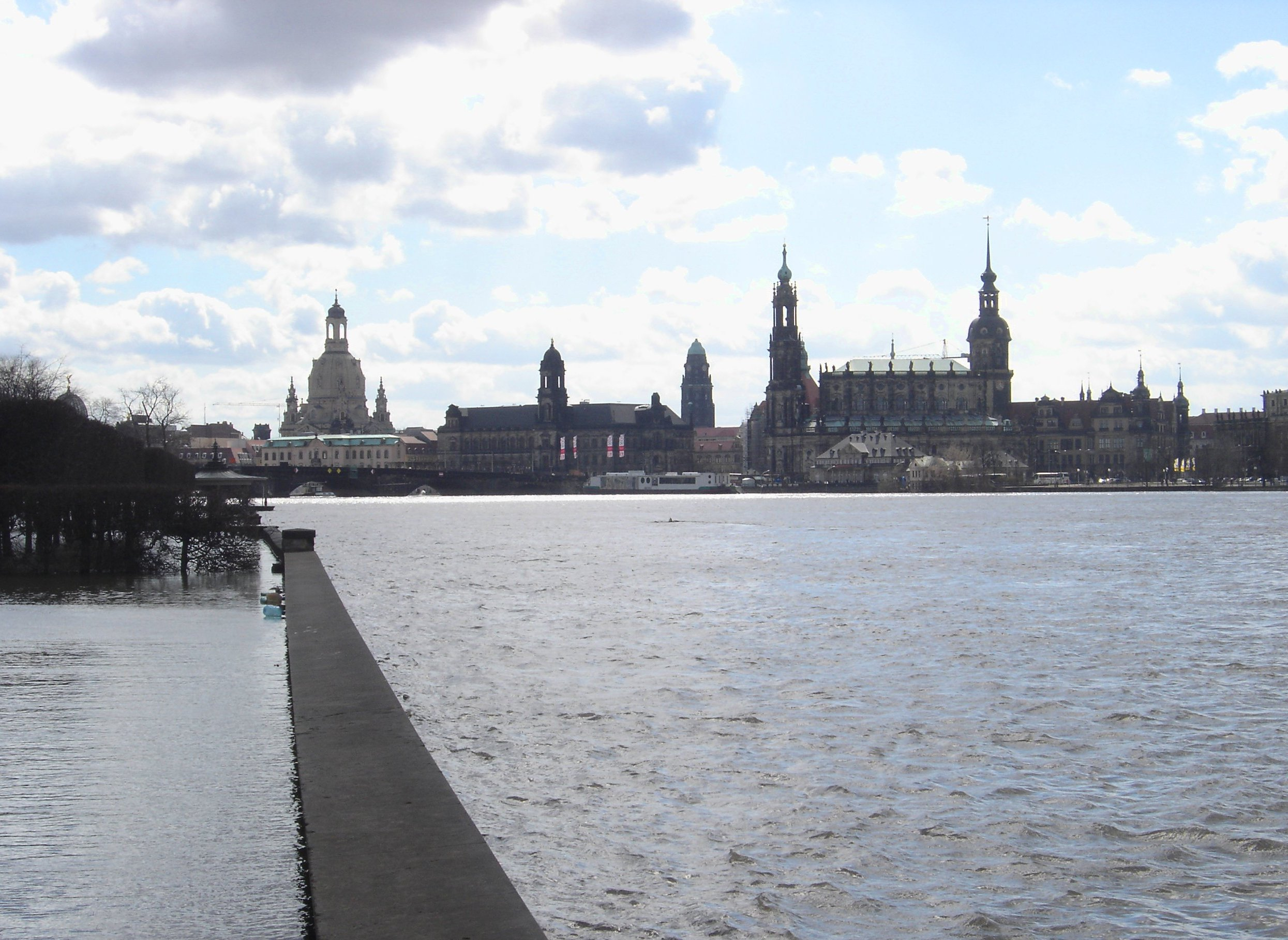
Dresden skyline in 2006

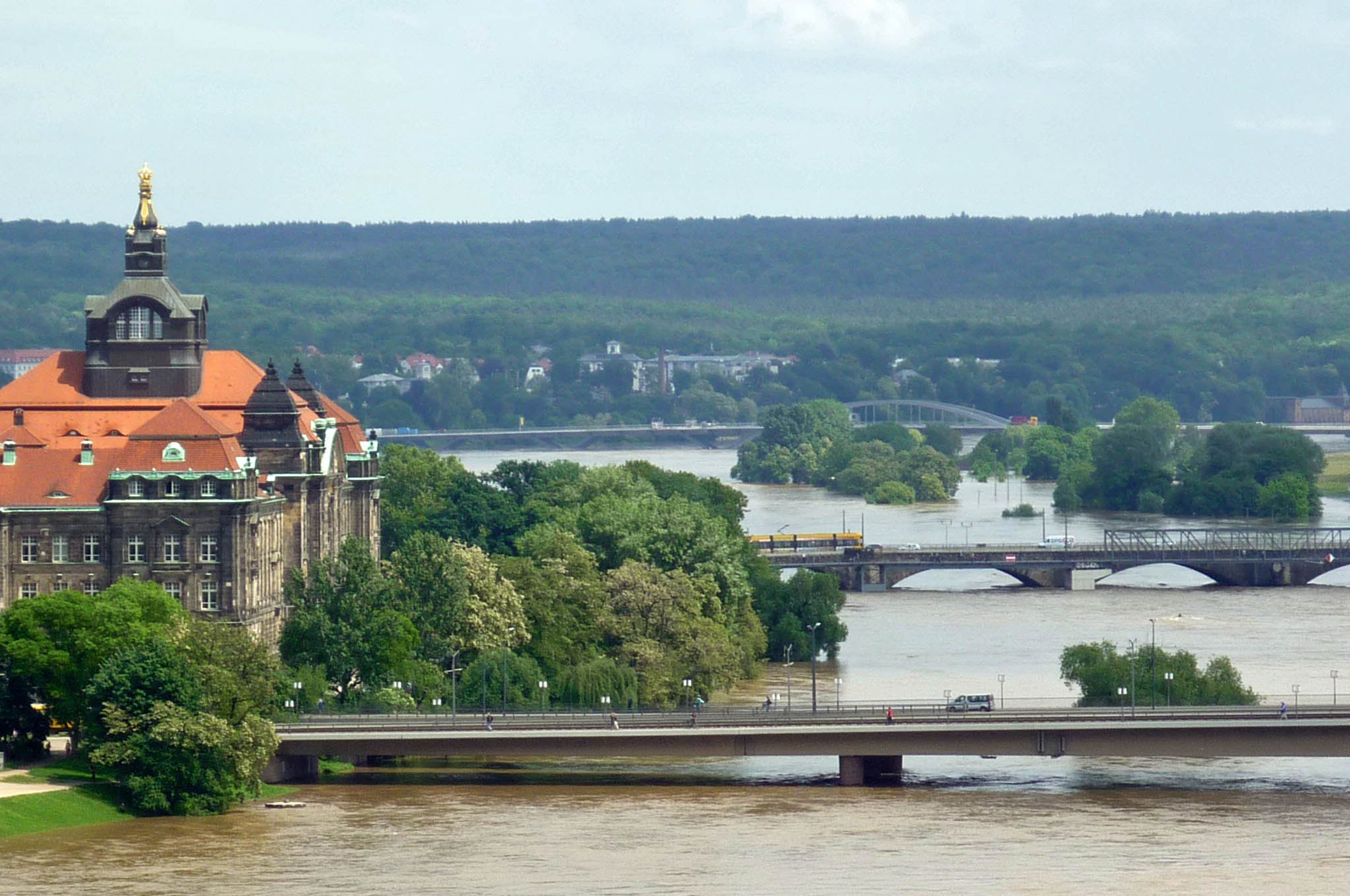
Dresden under water in June 2013

=== Structure of the city ===
Dresden is a spacious city. Its boroughs differ in their structure and appearance. Many parts still contain an old village core, while some quarters are almost completely preserved as rural settings. Other characteristic kinds of urban areas are the historic outskirts of the city, and the former suburbs with scattered housing. During the German Democratic Republic, many apartment blocks were built. The original parts of the city are almost all in the boroughs of Altstadt (Old town) and Neustadt (New town). Growing outside the city walls, the historic outskirts were built in the 18th and 19th century. They were planned and constructed on the orders of the Saxon monarchs and many of them are named after Saxon sovereigns (e.g. Friedrichstadt and Albertstadt). Dresden has been divided into ten boroughs called "Stadtbezirk" and nine former municipalities ("Ortschaften") which have been incorporated since 1990.

== Demographics ==
Population development of Dresden from 1871 to 2018

The population of Dresden grew to 100,000 inhabitants in 1852, making it one of the first German cities after Hamburg, Berlin and Breslau (now Wrocław, Poland) to reach that number. The population peaked at 649,252 in 1933, and dropped to 368,519 in 1945 because of World War II, during which large residential areas of the city were destroyed. After large incorporations and city restoration, the population grew to 522,532 again between 1946 and 1983. Following suburbanisation in the 1990s, Dresden experienced renewed population growth through migration into the city during the 2000s.

According to the official population estimates based on the 2022 German census, Dresden had 562,764 inhabitants on 31 December 2025. The city's population register recorded 571,510 residents with their main residence in Dresden on the same date, using a different statistical basis.

According to municipal register data, Dresden's average age was 43.8 years at the end of 2025, with 4.6% of residents aged 85 or over. At the end of 2024, the municipal statistical office estimated that Dresden had 312,021 private households, of which 166,560 (53.4%) consisted of a single person. The average private household contained 1.78 people.

=== Foreign population ===
At the end of 2025, 73,199 people registered in Dresden did not have German citizenship, accounting for 12.8% of the city's registered population.

Top 10 non-German populations
Nationality	Population (31 December 2022)
Ukraine	8,961
Syria	2,395
Russia	2,342
Vietnam	2,230
Poland	1,943
China	1,739
Italy	1,549
Czech Republic	1,276
Romania	1,126
India	1,078

=== Religion ===
The Protestant Reformation was introduced in Dresden in 1539 under Henry IV, Duke of Saxony. Although Augustus the Strong converted to Catholicism in 1697, Dresden's population remained predominantly Lutheran, creating a religious distinction between the ruling court and the city.

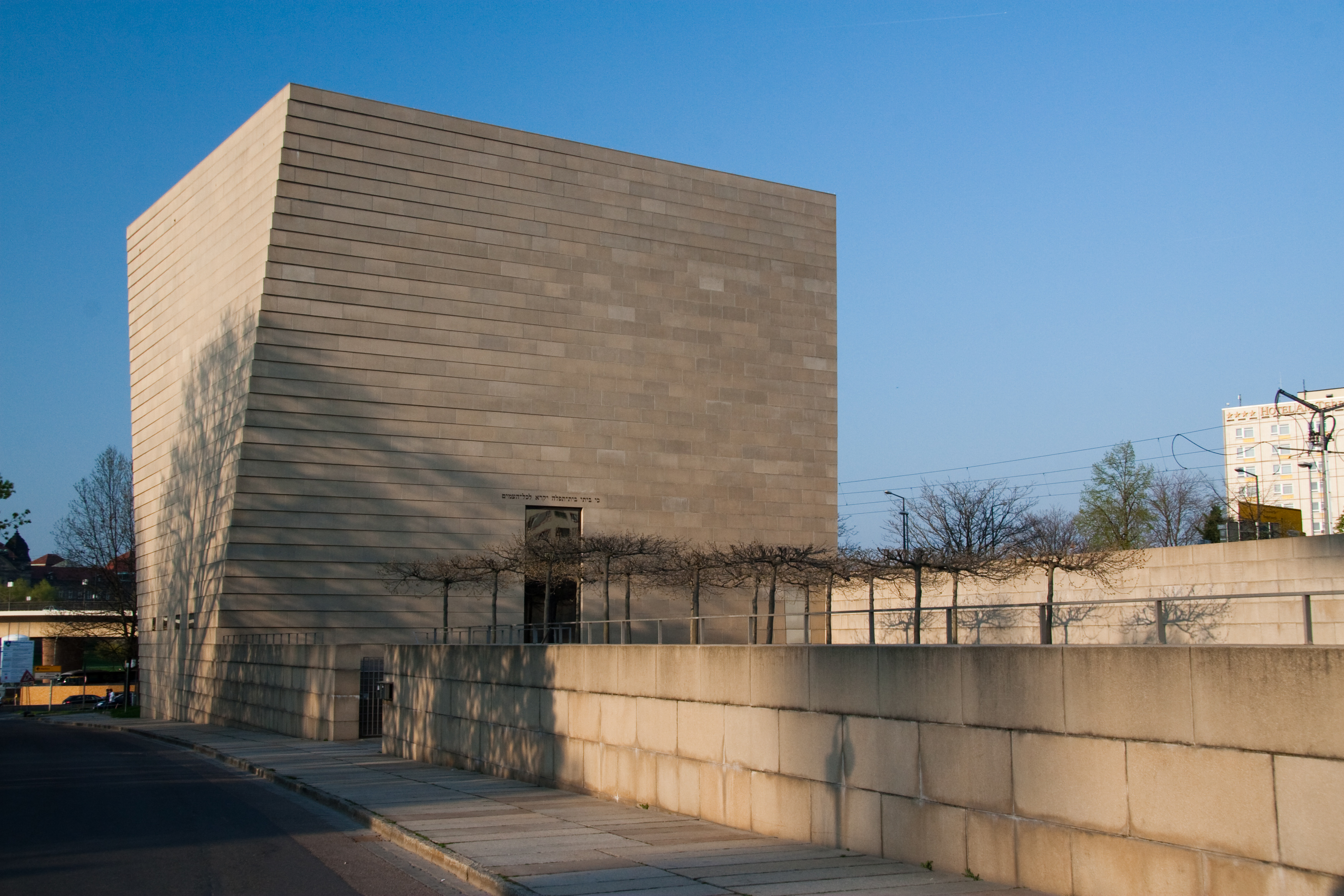
The New Synagogue, opened in 2001

Jewish life in Dresden is documented from the 13th century, although the community experienced expulsions and restrictions on settlement. Legislation in 1837 permitted Jews in Dresden to establish a religious community and build a synagogue, which opened in 1840. Under Nazi rule, the Jewish community was subjected to persecution, and the Semper Synagogue was destroyed during the November pogroms of 1938. The Jewish congregation was re-established in 1945 and expanded after 1990 through immigration from the former Soviet Union; the New Synagogue opened in 2001.

According to the 2022 German census, 12.7% of Dresden's population belonged to a Protestant church recognised under public law and 4.3% to the Roman Catholic Church. The remaining 83.0% were classified as having another religious affiliation, none or an unspecified affiliation; this figure does not therefore represent the proportion of people without religion. Other religious communities in Dresden include Orthodox Christian, Muslim, Buddhist, Hindu and Sikh groups.

== Governance ==
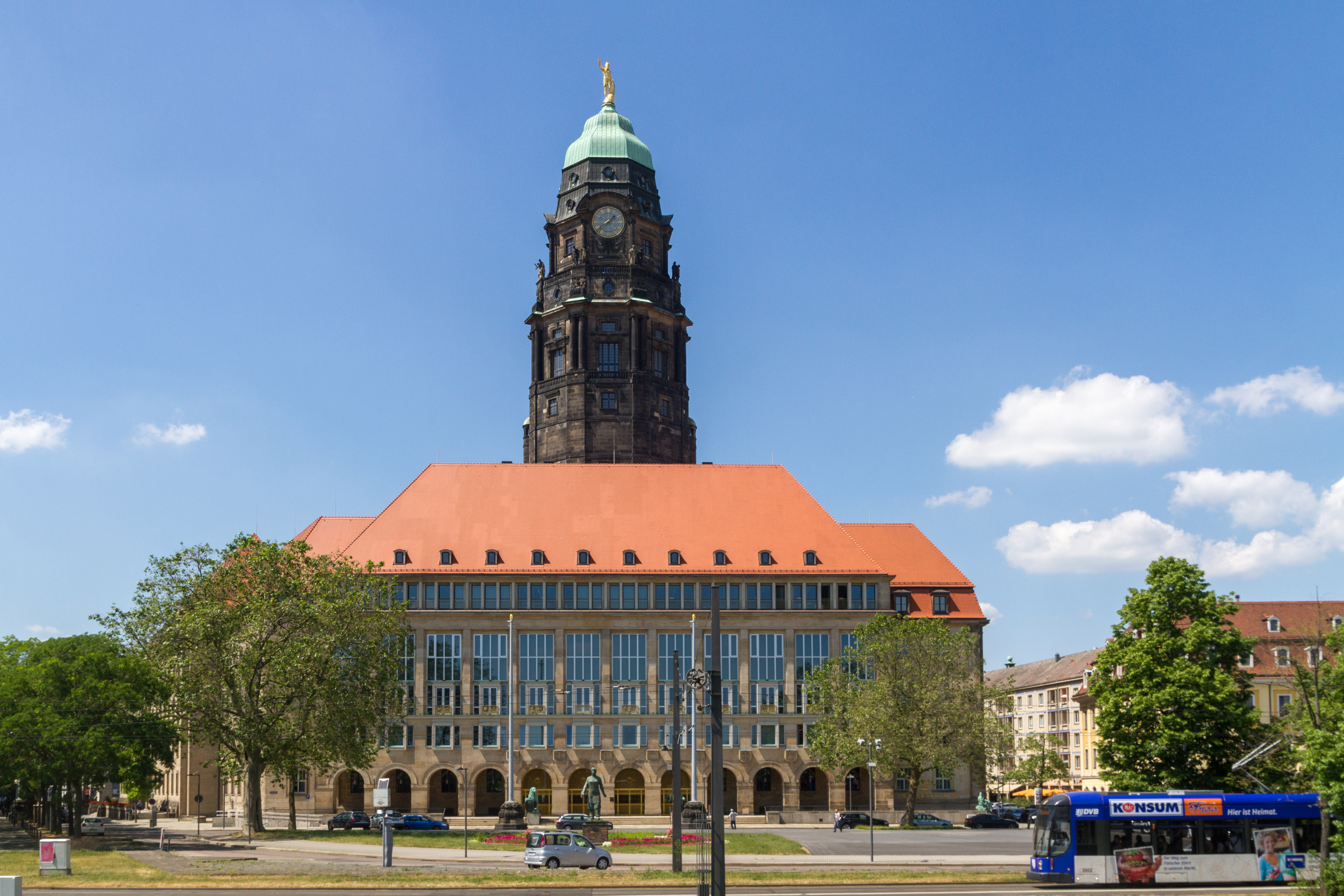
The New Town Hall, inaugurated in 1910, is the seat of Dresden's municipal administration.

Dresden is the capital of Saxony. It has institutions of democratic local self-administration that are independent from the capital functions.

Dresden hosted some international summits in recent years, such as the Petersburg Dialogue between Russia and Germany, the European Union's Minister of the Interior conference and the G8 labour ministers conference.

=== Mayor ===
The city council is the legislative branch of the city government. The council gives orders to the mayor (German: Bürgermeister) via resolutions and decrees, and thus also has some degree of executive power.

Results of the second round of the 2022 mayoral election

The first freely elected mayor after German reunification was Herbert Wagner of the Christian Democratic Union (CDU), who served from 1990 to 2001. The mayor was originally chosen by the city council, but since 1994 has been directly elected. Ingolf Roßberg of the Free Democratic Party (FDP) served from 2001 until 2008. He was succeeded by Helma Orosz (CDU). Dirk Hilbert was elected mayor in 2015 under the banner "Independent Citizens for Dresden". He was nominated by the FDP and Free Voters, and was endorsed by the CDU and AfD in the runoff. The most recent mayoral election was held on 12 June 2022, with a runoff held on 10 July, and the results were as follows:

Candidate	Party	First round		Second round	
Candidate	Party	Votes	%	Votes	%
Dirk Hilbert	Independent Citizens for Dresden (FDP, FW, CDU)	66,165	32.5	80,483	45.3
Eva Jähnigen	Alliance 90/The Greens (plus SPD, Left, Pirates in the runoff)	38,473	18.9	67,947	38.3
Albrecht Pallas	Social Democratic Party	31,068	15.2	Withdrew	
Maximilian Krah	Alternative for Germany	28,971	14.2	21,741	12.2
André Schollbach	The Left	20,898	10.3	Withdrew	
Marcus Fuchs	Independent	6,856	3.4	3,549	2.0
Martin Schulte-Wissermann	Pirate Party	5,975	2.9	Withdrew	
Sascha Wolff	Independent	2,695	1.3	Withdrew	
Jan Pöhnisch	Die PARTEI	2,684	1.3	3,824	2.2
Valid votes		203,785	99.4	177,544	99.5
Invalid votes		1,145	0.6	974	0.5
Total		204,930	100.0	178,518	100.0
Electorate/voter turnout		432,294	47.4	431,967	41.3

=== City council ===
Strongest party by locality in the 2024 City Council election

The most recent city council election was held on 9 June 2024, and the results were as follows:

Party	Votes	%	+/-	Seats	+/-
Alternative for Germany (AfD)	170,346	19.4	▲2.3	14	▲2
Christian Democratic Union (CDU)	157,717	18.0	▼0.3	13	0
Alliance 90/The Greens (Grüne)	128,099	14.6	▼5.9	10	▼5
Social Democratic Party (SPD)	78,652	9.0	▲0.2	6	0
Team Zastrow/Alliance Saxony 24	71,163	8.1	New	6	New
The Left (Die Linke)	68,012	7.8	▼8.4	5	▼7
Sahra Wagenknecht Alliance (BSW)	63,108	7.2	New	5	New
Free Voters Dresden (WV)	31,110	3.5	▼1.8	2	▼2
Pirate Party Germany (Piraten)	27,736	3.2	▲0.8	2	▲1
Free Democratic Party (FDP)	24,464	2.8	▼4.7	2	▼3
Die PARTEI (PARTEI)	16,363	1.9	▲0.1	1	▲1
Free Saxons (FS)	13,304	1.5	New	1	New
Volt Germany (Volt)	10,522	1.2	New	1	New
Dissidents Dresden (DissDD)	8,365	1.0	New	1	New
Free Citizens Dresden (FBD)	8,290	0.9	▼0.6	1	0
Valid votes	877,251	96.3			
Invalid votes	3,802	1.3			
Total	303,717	100.0		70	±0
Electorate/voter turnout	429,280	70.8	▲3.9		

=== Public institutions ===
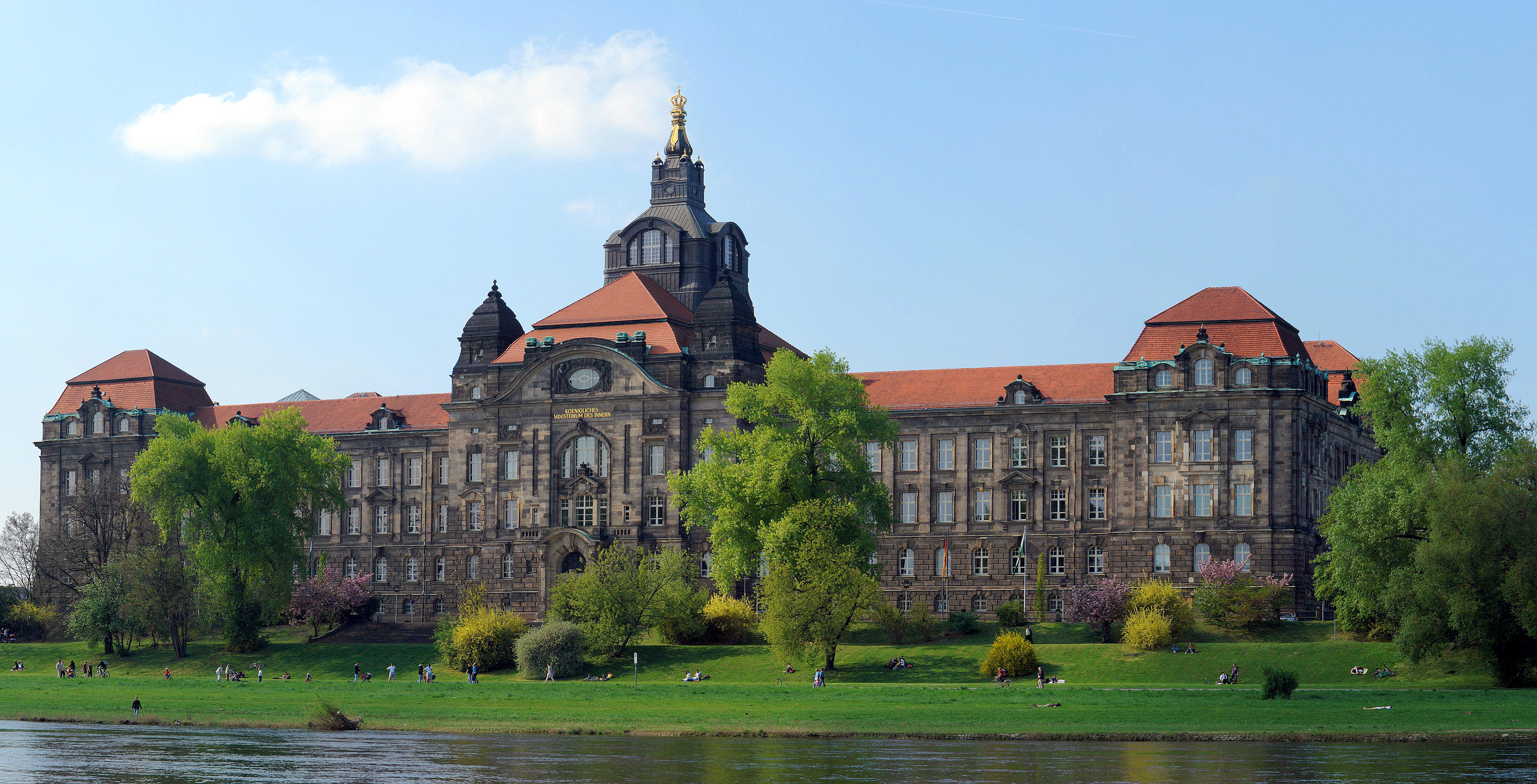
The Saxon State Chancellery assists the Minister-President of Saxony and coordinates the work of the state ministries.

As the capital of Saxony, Dresden is home to the Saxon state parliament (Landtag) and the ministries of the Saxon Government. The Saxon State Chancellery (Sächsische Staatskanzlei) supports the Minister-President of Saxony in setting government policy guidelines and coordinating the work of the state ministries. The controlling Constitutional Court of Saxony is in Leipzig. The highest Saxon court in civil and criminal law, is the Higher Regional Court of Dresden.

Most of the Saxon state authorities are located in Dresden. Dresden is home to the Regional Commission of the Dresden Regierungsbezirk, which is a controlling authority for the Saxon Government.

Like many cities in Germany, Dresden is also home to a local court, has a trade corporation and a Chamber of Industry and Trade and many subsidiaries of federal agencies (such as the Federal Labour Office or the Federal Agency for Technical Relief). It hosts some divisions of the German Customs and Waterways and Shipping Office.

Dresden is home to a military subdistrict command, but no longer has large military units as it did in the past. Dresden is the traditional location for army officer schooling in Germany, today carried out in the Offizierschule des Heeres.

== Cityscape ==
=== Architecture ===
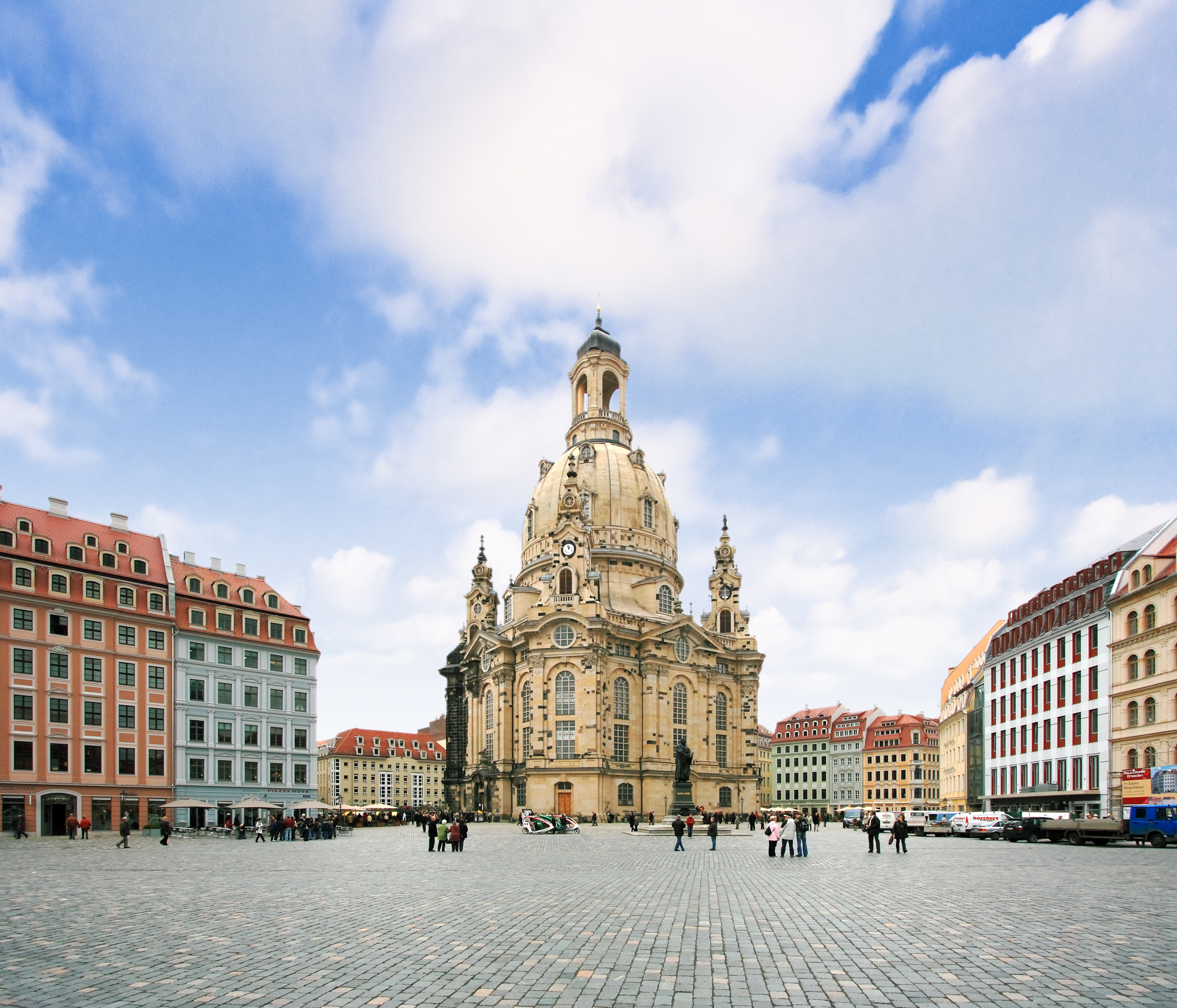
The Frauenkirche at the reconstructed Neumarkt

Dresden's present cityscape combines historic buildings, reconstructed monuments and architecture from the 20th and 21st centuries. The air raids of February 1945 destroyed large parts of the historic centre, while subsequent clearance removed further buildings, including some that could have been repaired. During the GDR period, selected monuments were restored, while parts of the centre, including the Altmarkt and Prager Straße, were redesigned on a larger scale. Plans to recover historic buildings and street patterns also emerged before German reunification. Since 1990, the reconstruction of historic buildings and the development of contemporary architecture have both shaped the city's centre, particularly around the Neumarkt.

Dresden has some 13,000 listed cultural monuments and eight districts under general preservation orders.

==== Court architecture ====
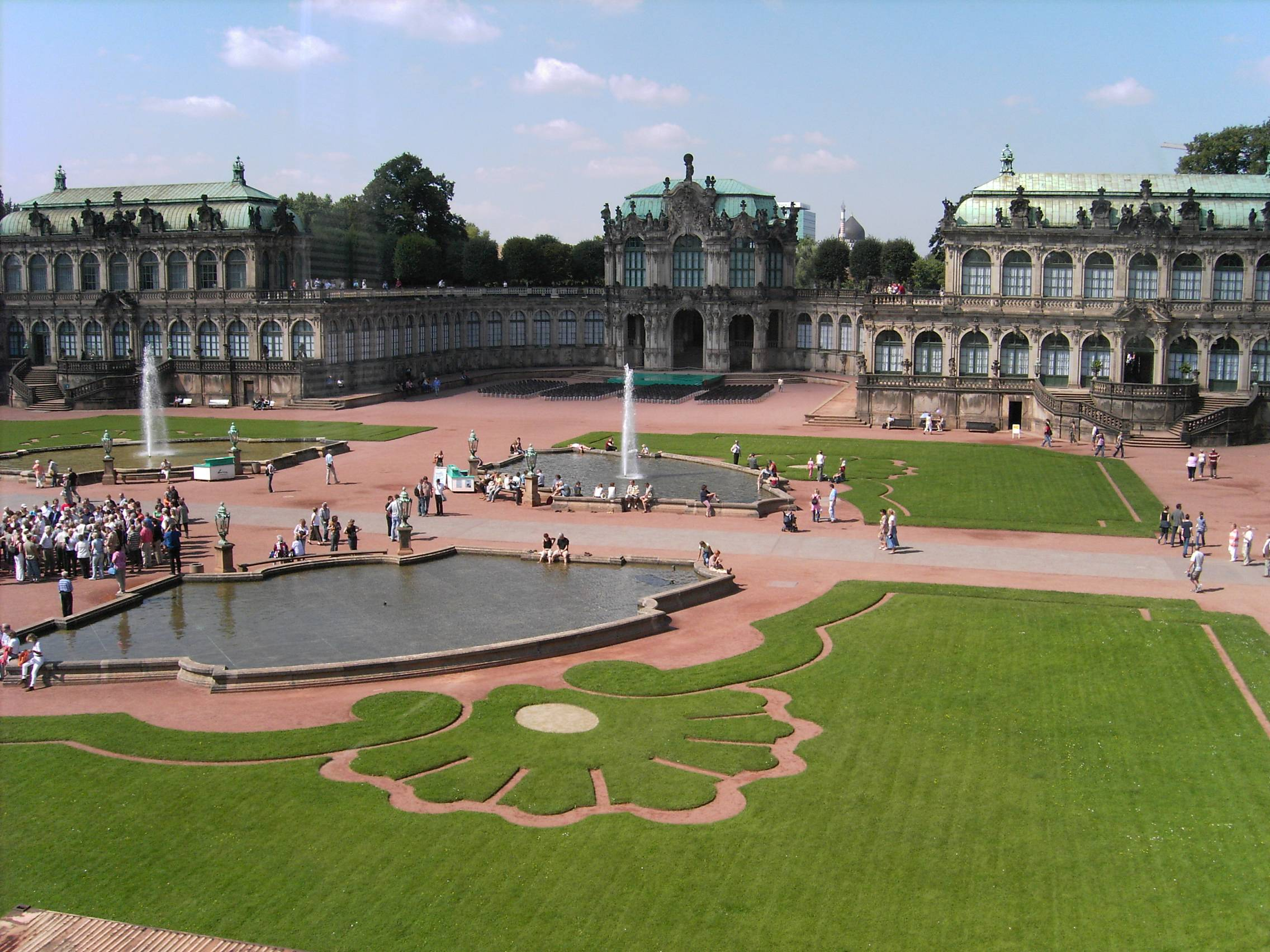
Zwinger Palace

The Royal Palace served as a residence of Saxon rulers from 1485 and preserves architectural elements from several periods, particularly the Renaissance. The nearby Zwinger was developed under Augustus the Strong, principally to designs by Matthäus Daniel Pöppelmann, as an orangery, setting for court festivities and later a home for the electoral collections. Plans to enlarge or replace the Royal Palace as part of the wider scheme were never realised. The Zwinger's open side was enclosed in the mid-19th century by Gottfried Semper's gallery building. Severely damaged in 1945, the Zwinger was largely rebuilt by 1963, while reconstruction of the Royal Palace continued through the GDR and post-reunification periods.

Other royal buildings and ensembles:

- Brühl's Terrace was a gift to Heinrich, count von Brühl, and became an ensemble of buildings above the river Elbe.
- Dresden Elbe Valley with the Pillnitz Castle and other castles

==== Sacred buildings ====
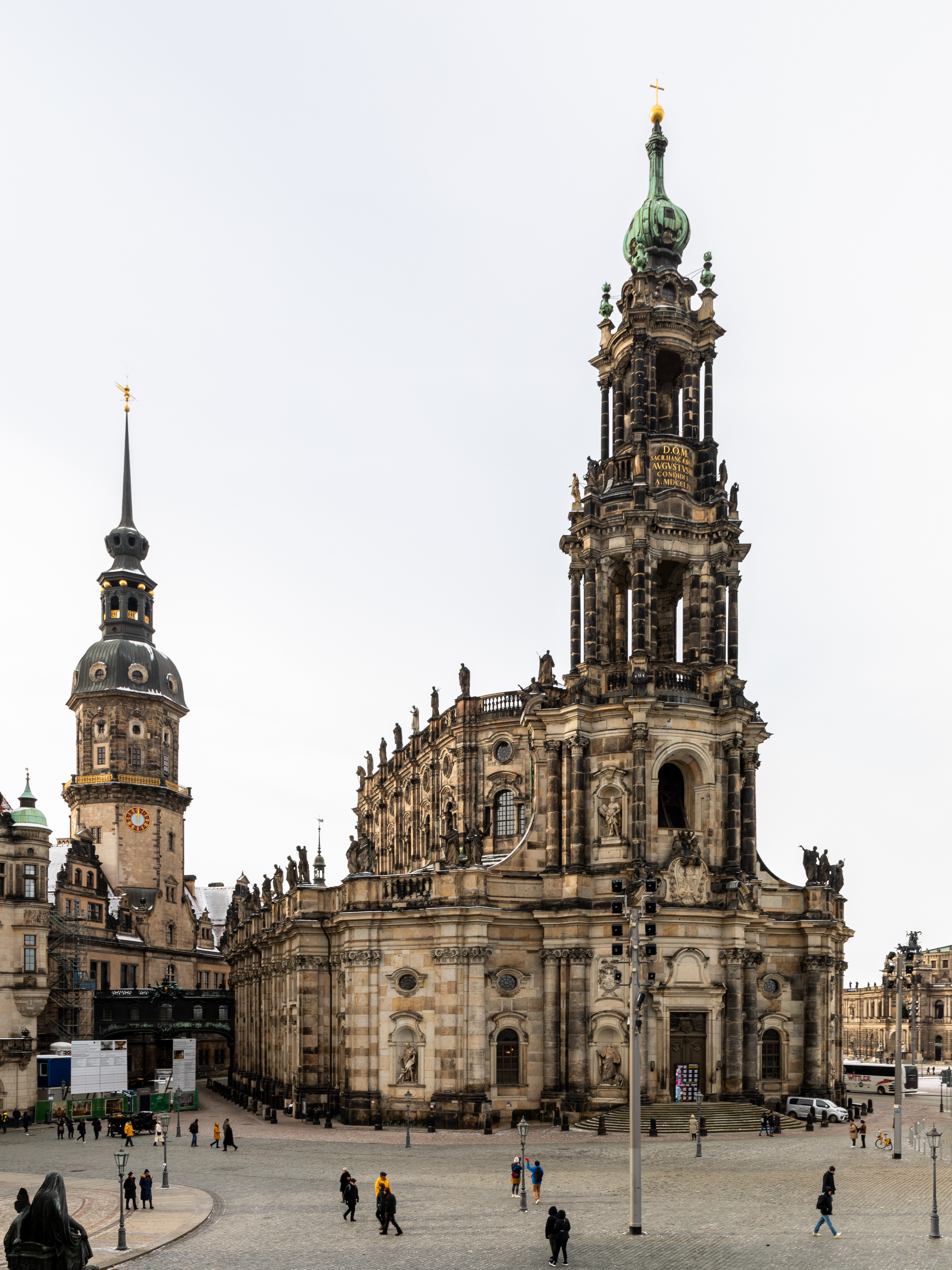
Dresden Cathedral

Plans for a Catholic court church dated from the reign of Augustus the Strong, who converted to Catholicism in 1697, but were not realised during his lifetime. The Catholic Court Church (Katholische Hofkirche), now Dresden Cathedral, was commissioned by his son, Frederick Augustus II, Elector of Saxony (King Augustus III of Poland), and his wife Maria Josepha of Austria. The Italian architect Gaetano Chiaveri was entrusted with the project in 1738, and the foundation stone was laid in 1739. The church was consecrated in 1751 and became the cathedral of the Roman Catholic Diocese of Dresden-Meissen in 1980. The crypt of the Wettin Dynasty is located within the church. King Augustus III of Poland is buried in the cathedral, as one of the very few kings of Poland to be buried outside the Wawel Cathedral in Kraków.

In contrast to the Catholic Cathedral, the Lutheran Frauenkirche located at the Neumarkt was built almost contemporaneously by the citizens of Dresden. The city's historic Kreuzkirche was reconsecrated in 1388.

There are also other churches in Dresden, like the Russian Orthodox St. Simeon of the Wonderful Mountain Church in the Südvorstadt district.

==== Historicism ====
The Semperoper, opened in its present architectural form in 1878, is a prominent example of 19th-century historicist theatre architecture in Dresden. Destroyed in 1945, the opera house was reconstructed during the GDR period and reopened in 1985. Public buildings around 1900, including the Saxon State Chancellery and the former Saxon parliamentary building, the Sächsisches Ständehaus, incorporated historical architectural forms alongside elements of newer styles. Notable examples of Renaissance Revival architecture in Dresden include the Albertinum located at Brühl's Terrace as well as the Saxon State Ministry of Finance located on the northern Elbe river banks. Yenidze is a former cigarette factory building built in the style of a mosque between 1907 and 1909. The New Town Hall was completed in 1910.

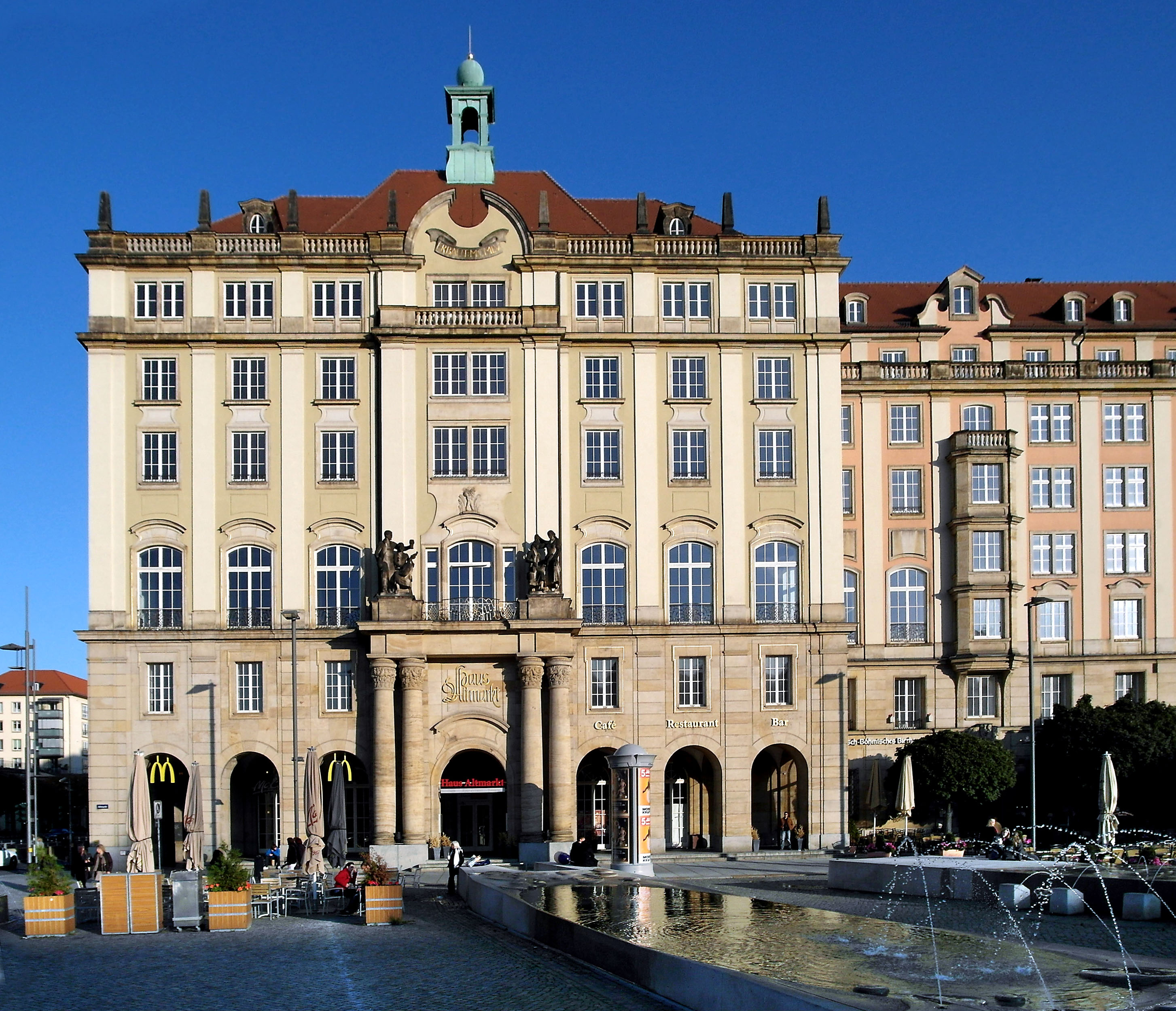
Stalinist architecture at the Altmarkt

The most recent historicist buildings in Dresden date from the short era of Stalinist architecture in the 1950s, e.g. at the Altmarkt.

==== Modernism and post-war planning ====
Founded in 1909, Hellerau was Germany's first garden city and combined housing, work and cultural facilities in an experiment in urban and social reform. Its Festspielhaus, designed by Heinrich Tessenow in 1911, is an example of early reform architecture. The German Hygiene Museum, designed by Wilhelm Kreis and opened in 1930, represents the modern architecture of the interwar period. In the 1990s, the garden city of Hellerau became a conservation area.

During the GDR era, larger modernist developments were undertaken along Prager Straße and at the Kulturpalast, which opened in 1969. The post-war ensemble at the Neustädter Markt, developed during the 1970s, was designated a protected monument in 2021, recognising the architectural and urban-planning significance of this period.

==== Architecture and reconstruction since 1990 ====
Following German reunification, the Frauenkirche was reconstructed between 1994 and 2005, while the surrounding Neumarkt was redeveloped in stages. The new urban fabric combines reconstructions of selected historical buildings and façades with new construction based partly on the former street and block pattern.

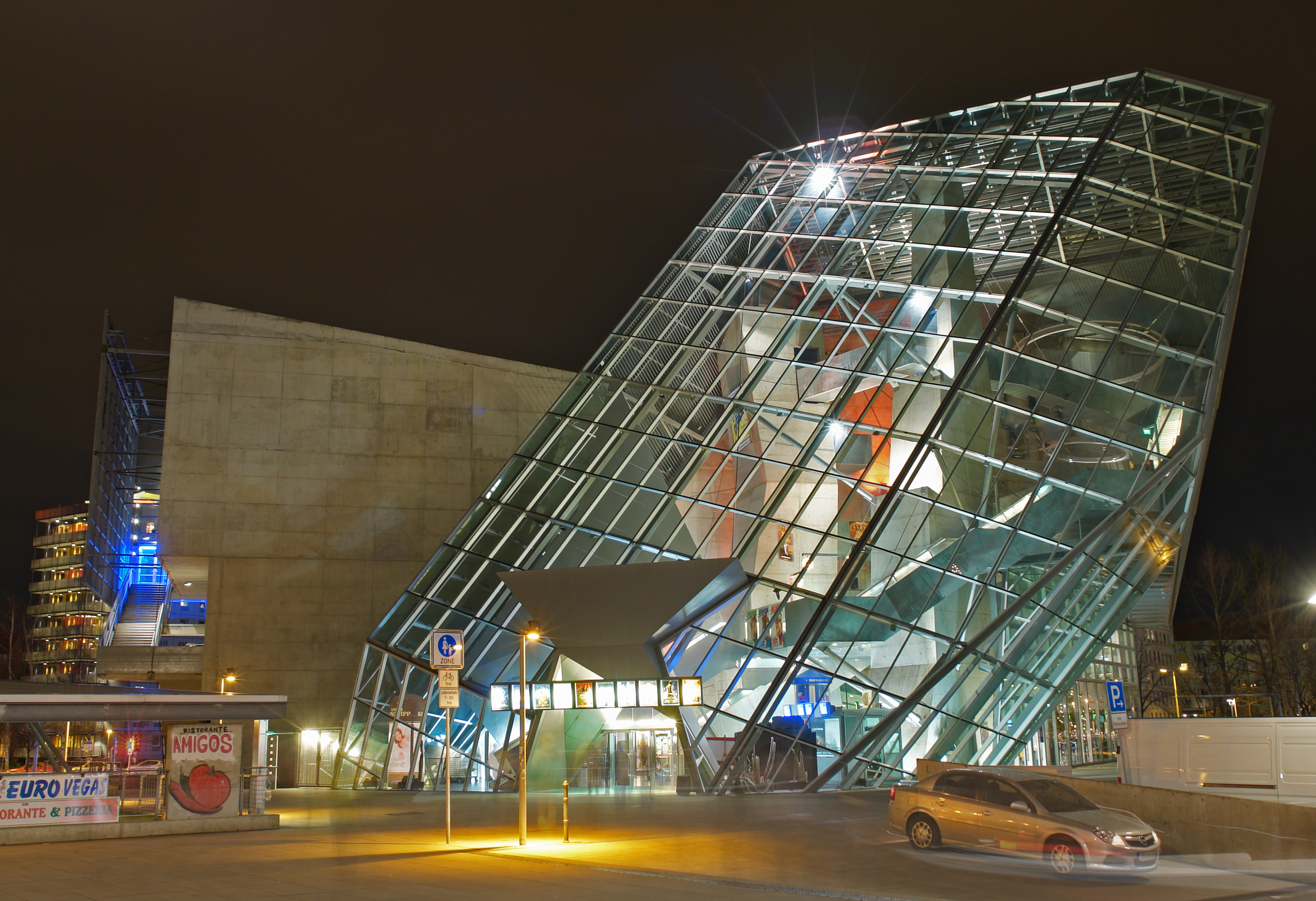
The deconstructivist Kristallpalast cinema, designed by Coop Himmelb(l)au

Contemporary architecture is represented by the New Synagogue, completed in 2001, and the deconstructivist Kristallpalast cinema, designed by Coop Himmelb(l)au and opened in 1998. At the Bundeswehr Military History Museum, Daniel Libeskind's extension, completed in 2011, inserts a modern wedge through the historic arsenal building.

==== Bridges ====
Important bridges crossing the Elbe river are the Blaues Wunder bridge and the Augustus Bridge.

In September 2024 one of the major Elbe river bridges in Dresden - Carola Bridge, collapsed and is currently undergoing demolition.

==== Statues ====
Jean-Joseph Vinache's golden equestrian statue of August the Strong, the Goldener Reiter (Golden Cavalier), is on the Neustädter Markt square. It shows August at the beginning of the Hauptstraße (Main street) on his way to Warsaw, where he was King of Poland in personal union. Another statue is the memorial of Martin Luther in front of the Frauenkirche.

=== Parks and gardens ===
Großer Garten is a Baroque garden in central Dresden. It includes the Dresden Zoo and the Dresden Botanical Garden.

The Dresden Heath is a large forest located in the northeast of Dresden and one of the city's most important recreation areas.

The park of Pillnitz Palace is famous for its botanical treasures, including a more than 230-year-old Japanese camellia and about 400 potted plants.

== Culture ==
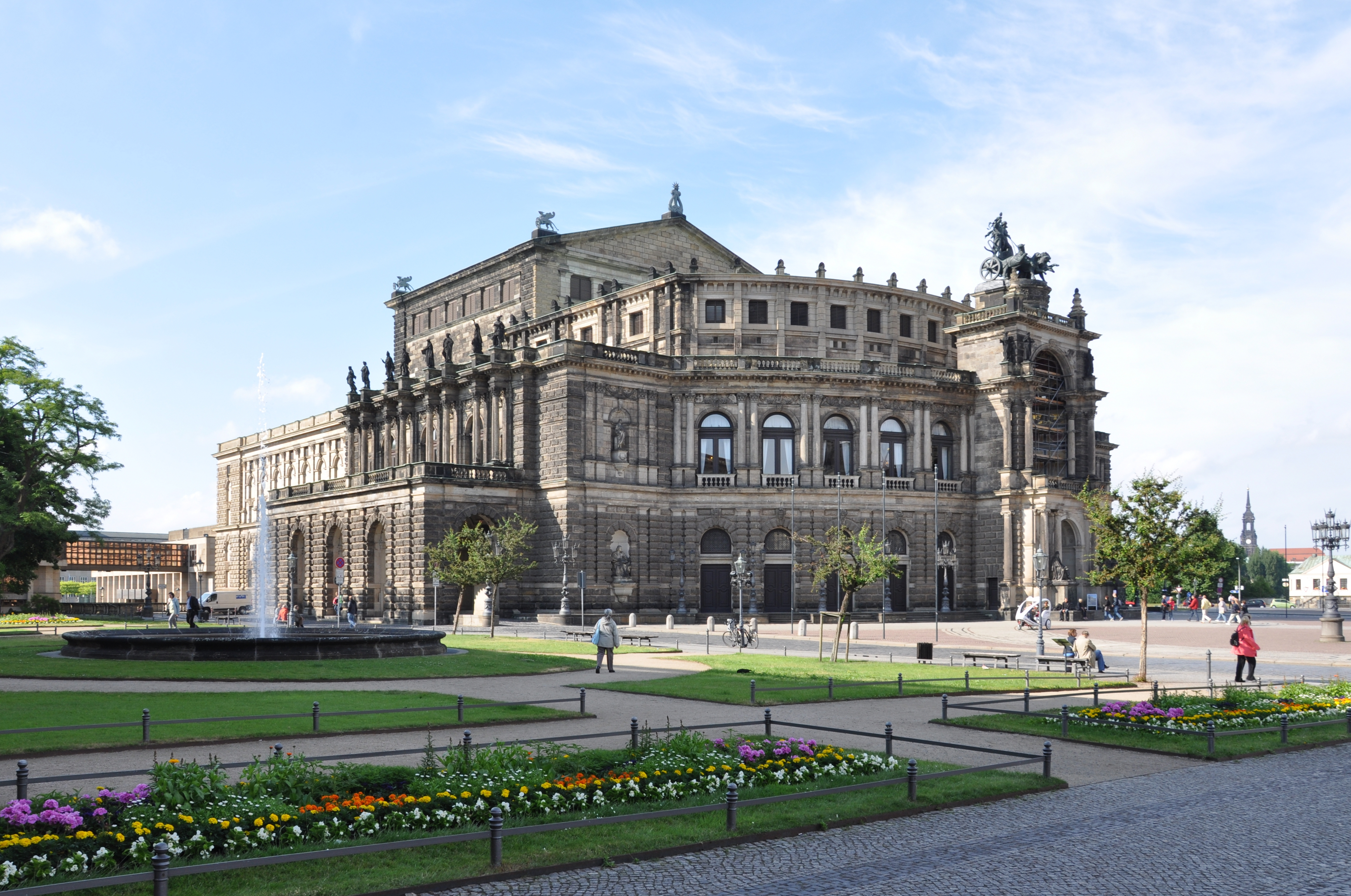
The Semperoper, completely rebuilt and reopened in 1985

Carl Maria von Weber and Richard Wagner had a number of their works performed for the first time in Dresden. Other artists, such as Ernst Ludwig Kirchner, Otto Dix, Oskar Kokoschka, Richard Strauss, Gottfried Semper and Gret Palucca, were also active in the city. Dresden is also home to several art collections and musical ensembles.

=== Entertainment ===
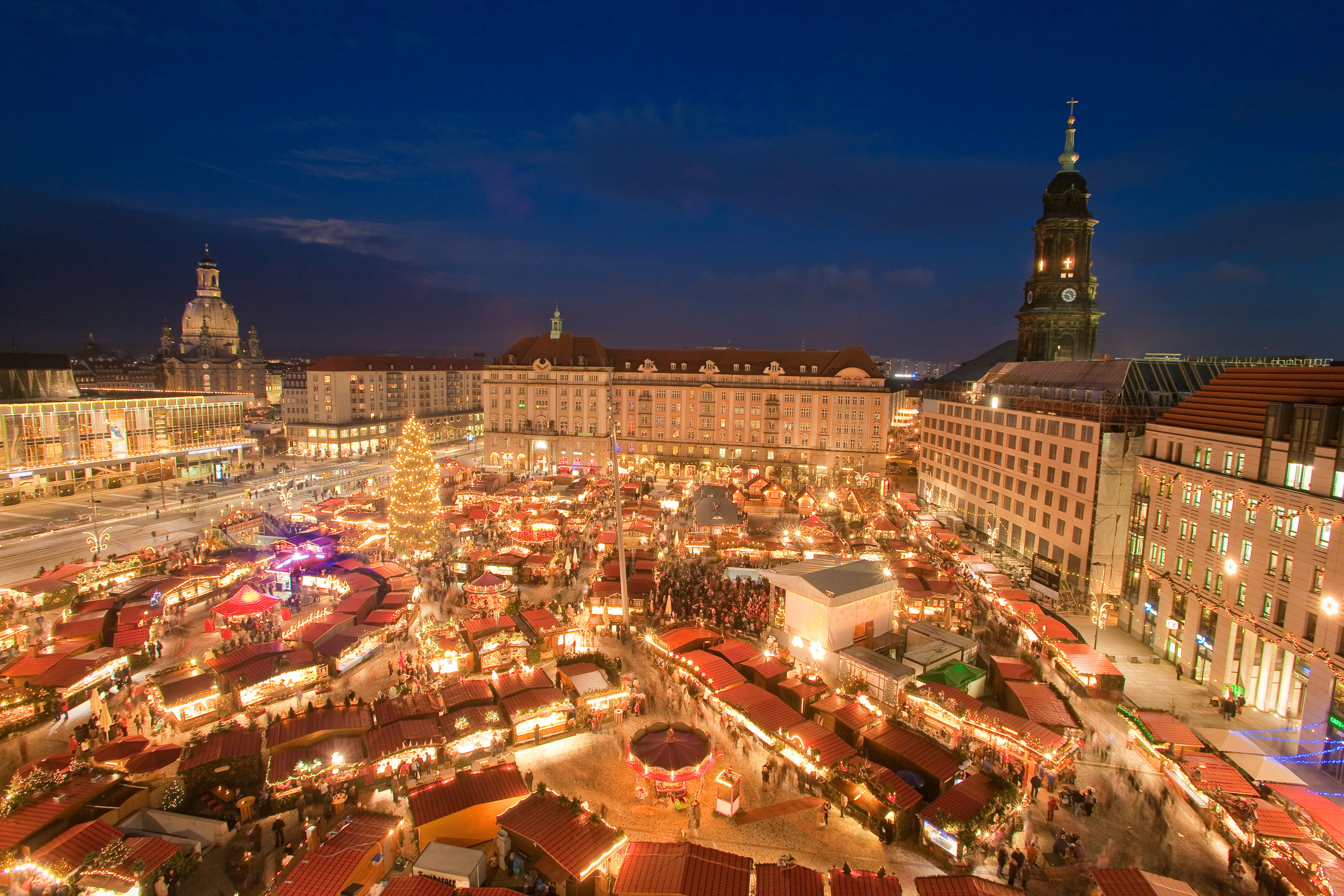
View over Altmarkt (Old market) during Striezelmarkt

The Saxon State Opera descends from the opera company of the former electors and Kings of Saxony. Their first opera house was the Opernhaus am Taschenberg, opened in 1667. The Opernhaus am Zwinger presented opera from 1719 to 1756, when the Seven Years' War began. The later Semperoper was completely destroyed during the bombing of Dresden during the second world war. The opera's reconstruction was completed exactly 40 years later, on 13 February 1985. Its musical ensemble is the Sächsische Staatskapelle Dresden, founded in 1548. The Dresden State Theatre runs a number of smaller theatres. The Dresden State Operetta is the only independent operetta in Germany. The Herkuleskeule (Hercules club) is an important site in German-speaking political cabaret.

There are several choirs in Dresden, the best-known of which is the Dresdner Kreuzchor (Choir of The Holy Cross). It is a boys' choir drawn from pupils of the Kreuzschule, and was founded in the 13th century. The Dresdner Kapellknaben are not related to the Staatskapelle, but to the former Hofkapelle, the Catholic cathedral, since 1980. The Dresden Philharmonic Orchestra is the orchestra of the city of Dresden.

Throughout the summer, the outdoor concert series "Zwingerkonzerte und Mehr" is held in the Zwingerhof. Performances include dance and music.

There are several small cinemas presenting cult films and low-budget or low-profile films chosen for their cultural value. Dresden also has a few multiplex cinemas, of which the Rundkino is one.

Dresden's Striezelmarkt is one of the largest Christmas markets in Germany. Founded as a one-day market in 1434, it is considered the first genuine Christmas market in the world.

A big event each year in June is the Bunte Republik Neustadt, a culture festival lasting three days in the city district of Dresden-Neustadt. Bands play live concerts for free in the streets and there are refreshments and food.

=== Museums ===
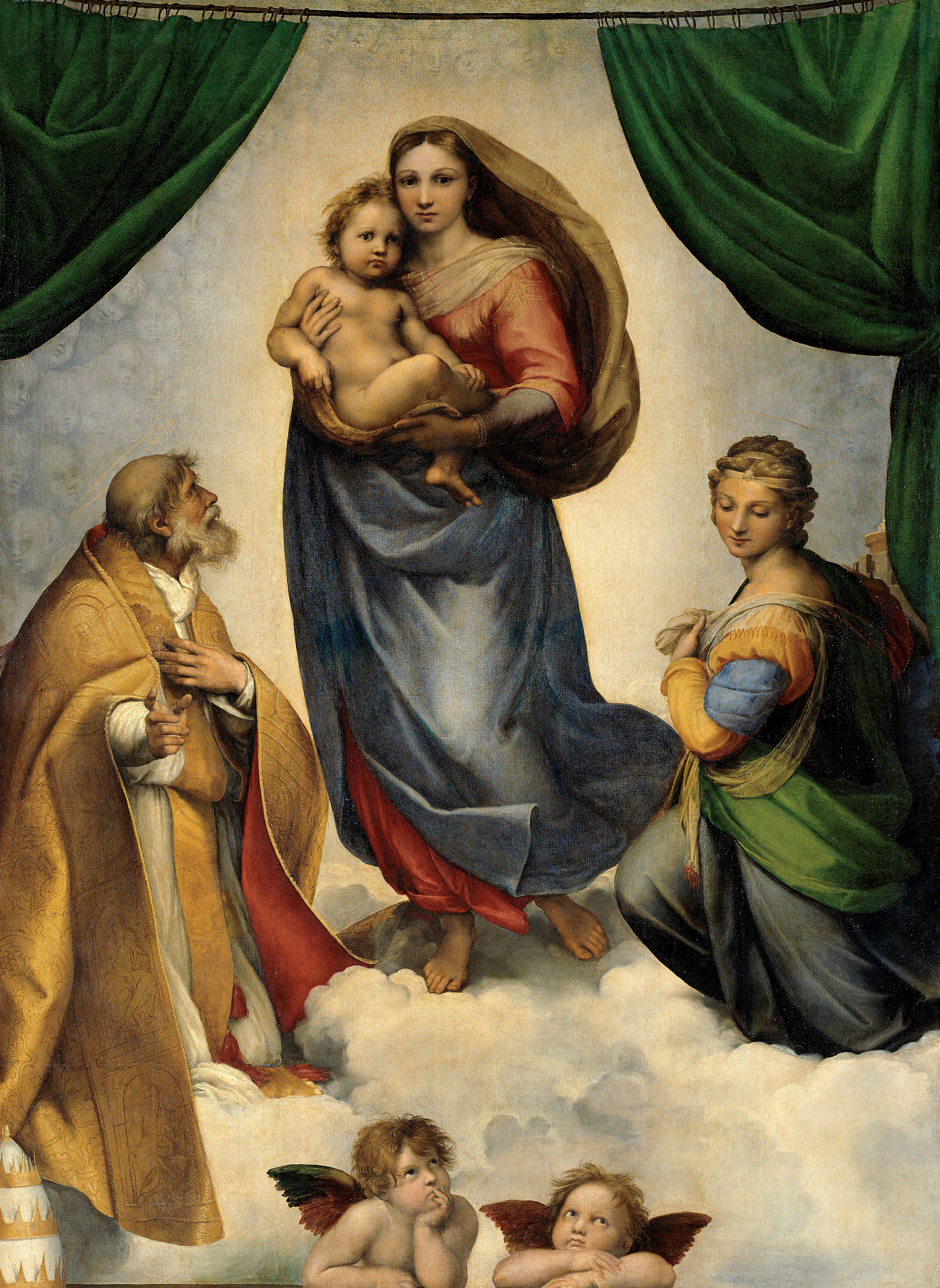
Sistine Madonna by Raphael in the Gemäldegalerie Alte Meister

Dresden hosts the Staatliche Kunstsammlungen Dresden (Dresden State Art Collections) which, according to the institution's own statements, place it among the most important museums presently in existence. The art collections consist of twelve museums, including the Gemäldegalerie Alte Meister (Old Masters Gallery) and the Grünes Gewölbe (Green Vault) and the Japanese Palace (Japanisches Palais). Also known are Galerie Neue Meister (New Masters Gallery), Rüstkammer (Armoury) with the Turkish Chamber, and the Museum für Völkerkunde Dresden (Museum of Ethnology). Other museums and collections owned by the Free State of Saxony in Dresden are:

- The Deutsche Hygiene-Museum, founded for mass education in hygiene, health, human biology and medicine
- The Landesmuseum für Vorgeschichte (State Museum of Prehistory)
- The Senckenberg Naturhistorische Sammlungen Dresden (Senckenberg Natural History Collections Dresden)
- The Universitätssammlung Kunst + Technik (Collection of Art and Technology of the Dresden University of Technology)
- Verkehrsmuseum Dresden (Transport Museum)
- Festung Dresden (Dresden Fortress)
- Panometer Dresden (Dresden Panometer) (Panorama museum)

The Dresden City Museum is run by the city of Dresden and focused on the city's history.

The Bundeswehr Military History Museum is placed in the former garrison in the Albertstadt.

The book museum of the Saxon State Library presents the Dresden Codex.

The Kraszewski Museum is a museum dedicated to the most prolific Polish writer Józef Ignacy Kraszewski, who lived in Dresden from 1863 to 1883.

== Transport ==
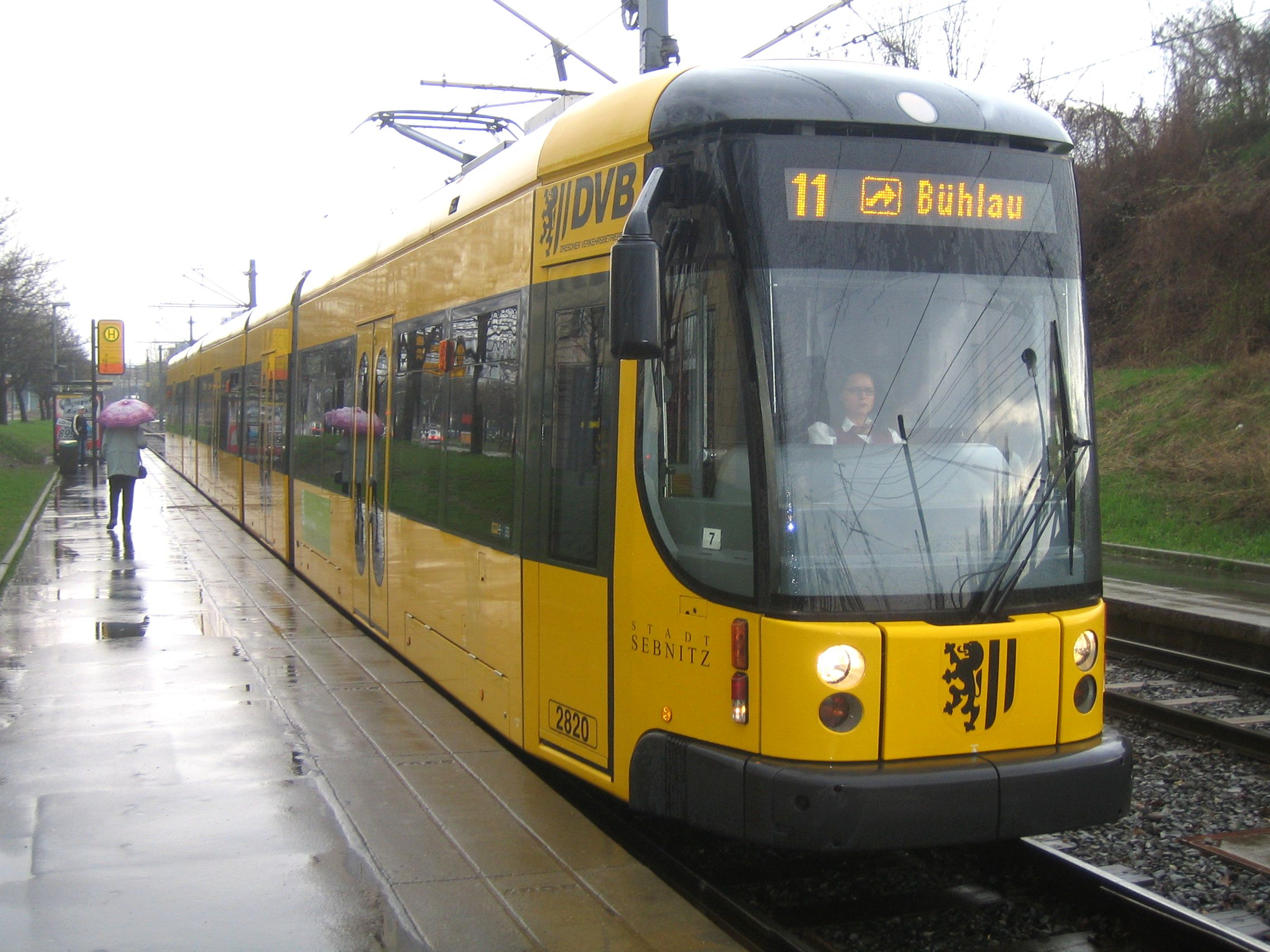
The longest trams in Dresden set a record in length.

=== Bus ===
DVB is the municipal company in charge of transport in the city of Dresden. DVB provides a night service named GuteNachtLinie ('goodnight lines'), which operates Monday-Sunday, although the frequency of the buses is greater on Friday, Saturday and before holidays when the routes run every 30 minutes between 22:45 and 04:45. Postplatz is the most important hub for night-time travel in Dresden. Most GuteNachtLinie routes meet here at the same time to allow people to switch routes.

=== Roads ===
The Bundesautobahn 4 (European route E40) crosses Dresden in the northwest from west to east. The Bundesautobahn 17 leaves the A4 in a south-eastern direction. In Dresden it begins to cross the Ore Mountains towards Prague. The Bundesautobahn 13 leaves from the three-point interchange "Dresden-Nord" and goes to Berlin. The A13 and the A17 are on the European route E55. In addition, several Bundesstraßen (federal highways) run through Dresden.

=== Rail ===
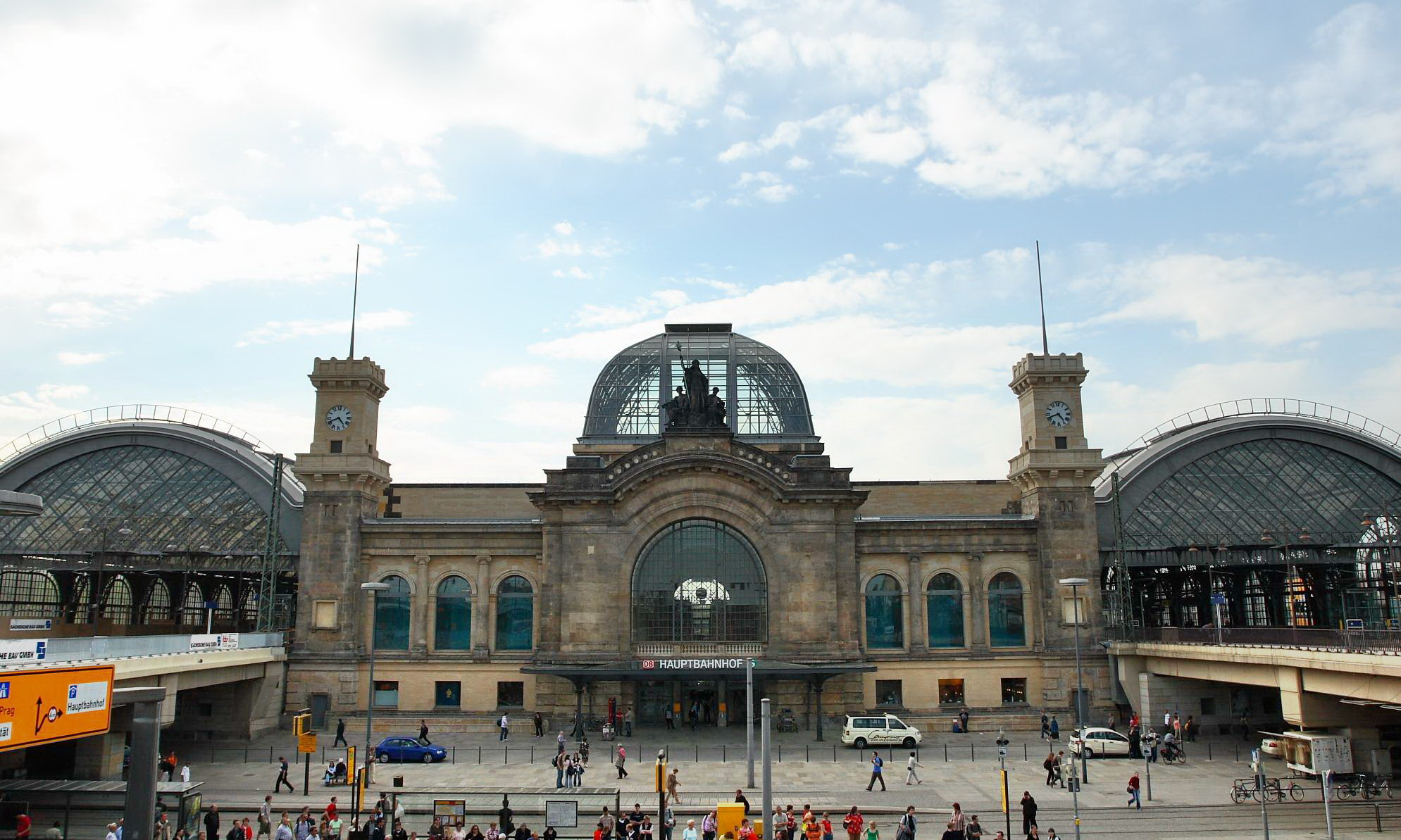
Dresden Central Station is the main inter-city transport hub.

There are two main inter-city transit hubs in the railway network in Dresden: Dresden Hauptbahnhof and Dresden-Neustadt railway station. The most important railway lines run to Berlin, Prague, Leipzig and Chemnitz. A commuter train system (Dresden S-Bahn) operates on three lines alongside the long-distance routes.

=== Air ===
Dresden Airport is the city's international airport, located at the north-western outskirts of the city. After German reunification the airport's infrastructure has been considerably improved. In 1998, a motorway access route was opened. In March 2001, a new terminal building was opened along with the underground S-Bahn station Dresden Flughafen, a multi-storey car park and a new aircraft handling ramp.

Dresden is also directly connected to Berlin Brandenburg Airport by the IC 17.

=== Trams ===
Dresden has a large tram network operated by Dresdner Verkehrsbetriebe, the municipal transport company. It operates twelve lines on a 200 km (124 mi) network. Many of the new low-floor vehicles are up to 45 metres long and produced by Bombardier Transportation in Bautzen. While about 30% of the system's lines are on reserved track (often sown with grass to reduce noise), many tracks still run on the streets, especially in the inner city.

The CarGoTram was a tram that supplied Volkswagen's Transparent Factory, crossing the city. The transparent factory was located not far from the city centre next to the city's largest park.

The districts of Loschwitz and Weisser Hirsch are connected by the Dresden Funicular Railway, which has been carrying passengers back and forth since 1895.

== Economy ==
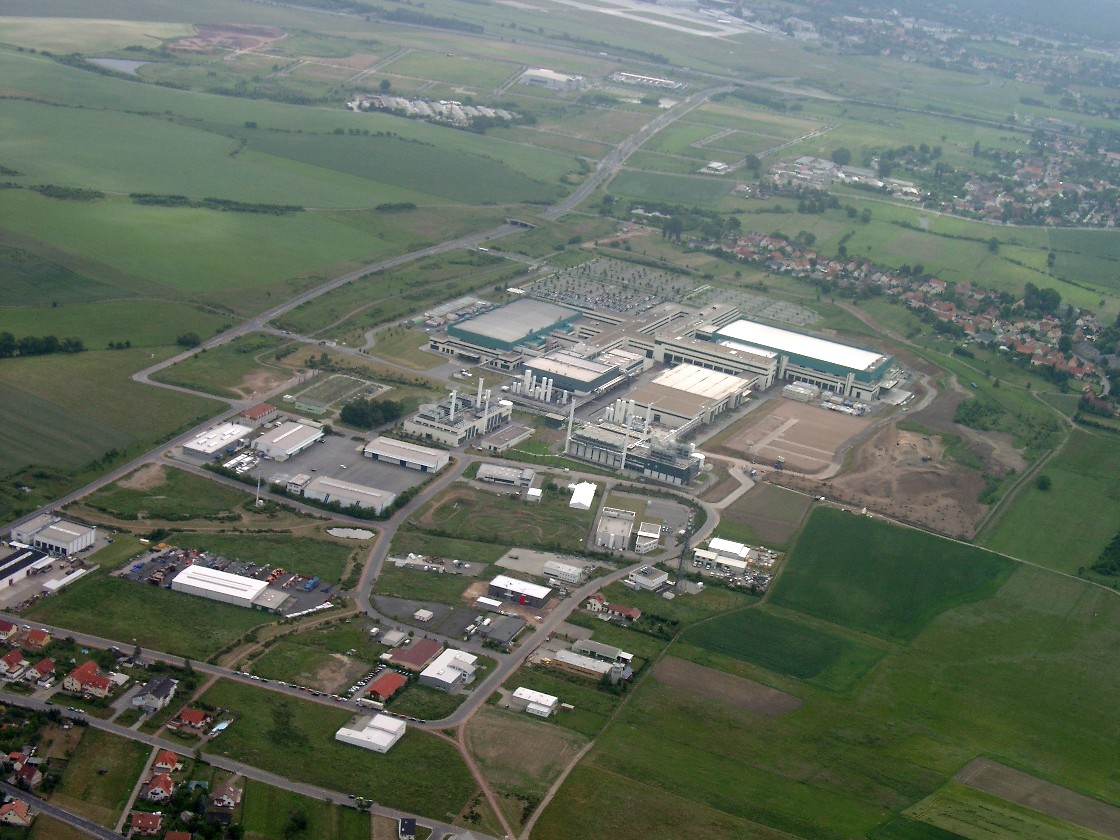
GlobalFoundries semiconductor factory

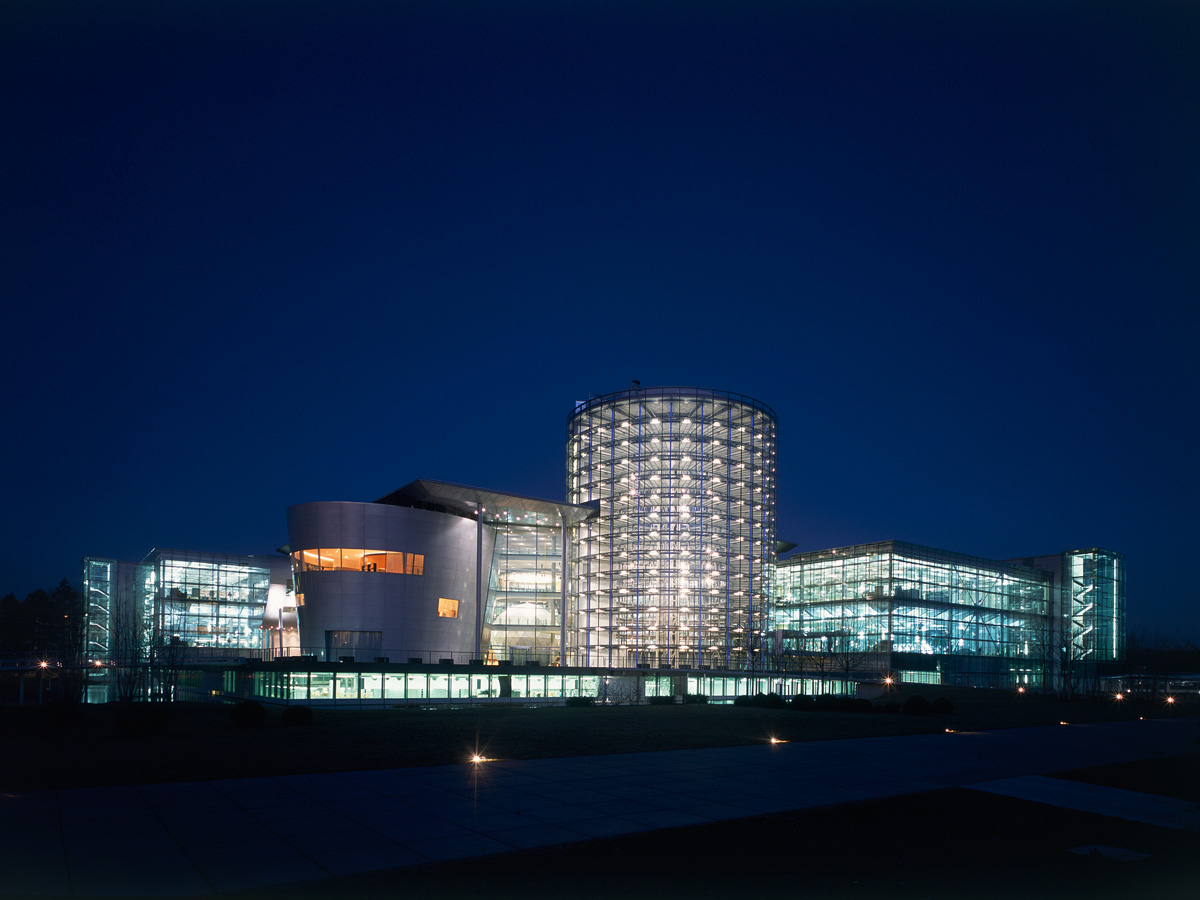
Transparent Factory owned by Volkswagen

Dresden's economy combines a large service sector with specialised manufacturing, particularly in microelectronics and semiconductor production. In June 2024, the city had 281,736 employees subject to social security contributions, including 88,143 in public administration, education, healthcare and social work, compared with 38,328 in producing industries excluding construction. The registered unemployment rate was 7.0% in October 2026.

During the GDR period, Dresden developed into a centre of microelectronics production, leaving a concentration of technical expertise and research institutions. Following German reunification in 1990, many former state-owned industrial enterprises underwent restructuring or closure, while investment in new semiconductor plants contributed to the development of the regional high-technology industry. An economic study published by the Ifo Institute for Economic Research in 2016 found that technology-based manufacturing had been an important driver of Dresden's economic growth during the 1990s and early 2000s, while the service sector had played a major role in stabilising employment.

=== Enterprises ===
Dresden is the centre of the Silicon Saxony microelectronics cluster, which includes semiconductor manufacturers, specialised suppliers and research institutions. GlobalFoundries operates a semiconductor fabrication plant in Dresden, having taken over AMD's manufacturing operations there in 2009. Infineon Technologies opened its €5 billion Smart Power Fab in July 2026 to expand production of power and analogue/mixed-signal semiconductors. Bosch opened a separate 300-mm semiconductor plant in Dresden in 2021, producing chips for automotive and industrial applications. The local supply chain also includes Tekscend Photomask (formerly Toppan Photomasks) and the Advanced Mask Technology Center, which manufactures photolithography masks used in semiconductor production.

A further semiconductor plant is being built by the European Semiconductor Manufacturing Company (ESMC), a joint venture between TSMC, Bosch, Infineon and NXP Semiconductors. The European Commission approved €5 billion in German state aid for the project in 2024, with the planned factory intended to produce semiconductors for automotive and industrial applications. Construction reached the topping-out stage in September 2026, while installation of the first manufacturing equipment was scheduled for 2027.

The pharmaceutical sector developed at the end of the 19th century. The 'Sächsisches Serumwerk Dresden' (Saxon Serum Plant, Dresden), owned by GlaxoSmithKline, is a global leader in vaccine production. Another traditional pharmaceuticals producer is Arzneimittelwerke Dresden (Pharmaceutical Works, Dresden).

A third traditional branch is that of mechanical and electrical engineering. Major employers are Elbe Flugzeugwerke (Elbe Aircraft Works), Siemens and Linde-KCA-Dresden. The tourism industry enjoys high revenue and supports many employees. There are around one hundred bigger hotels in Dresden, many of which cater in the upscale range.

=== Media ===
The media in Dresden include two major newspapers of regional record: the Sächsische Zeitung (Saxon Newspaper, circulation around 228,000) and the Dresdner Neueste Nachrichten (Dresden's Latest News, circulation around 50,000). The Dresdner Druck- und Verlagshaus (Dresden printing plant and publishing house) produces part of Spiegel's print run, amongst other newspapers and magazines.

Local TV and radio regional programming is provided by MDR, which is a member organization of Germany's largest public broadcasting network, ARD consortium, broadcast from Leipzig. The network also has a broadcast centre and studios in Dresden which broadcast the local news programme Sachsenspiegel on MDR Fernsehen TV and MDR Sachsen on radio. Local community based radio stations are coloRadio and Radio Dresden.

== Education and science ==
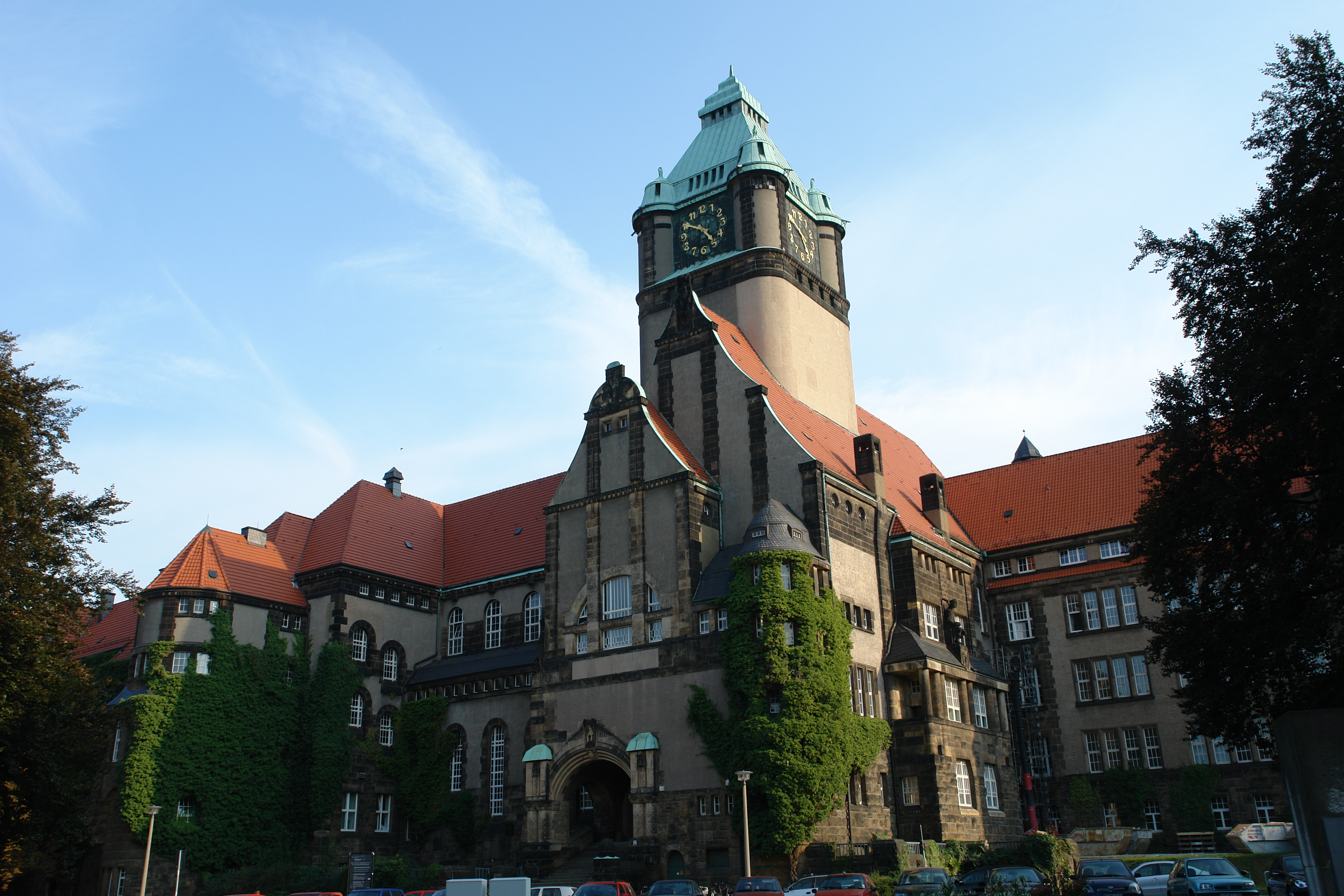
TU Dresden

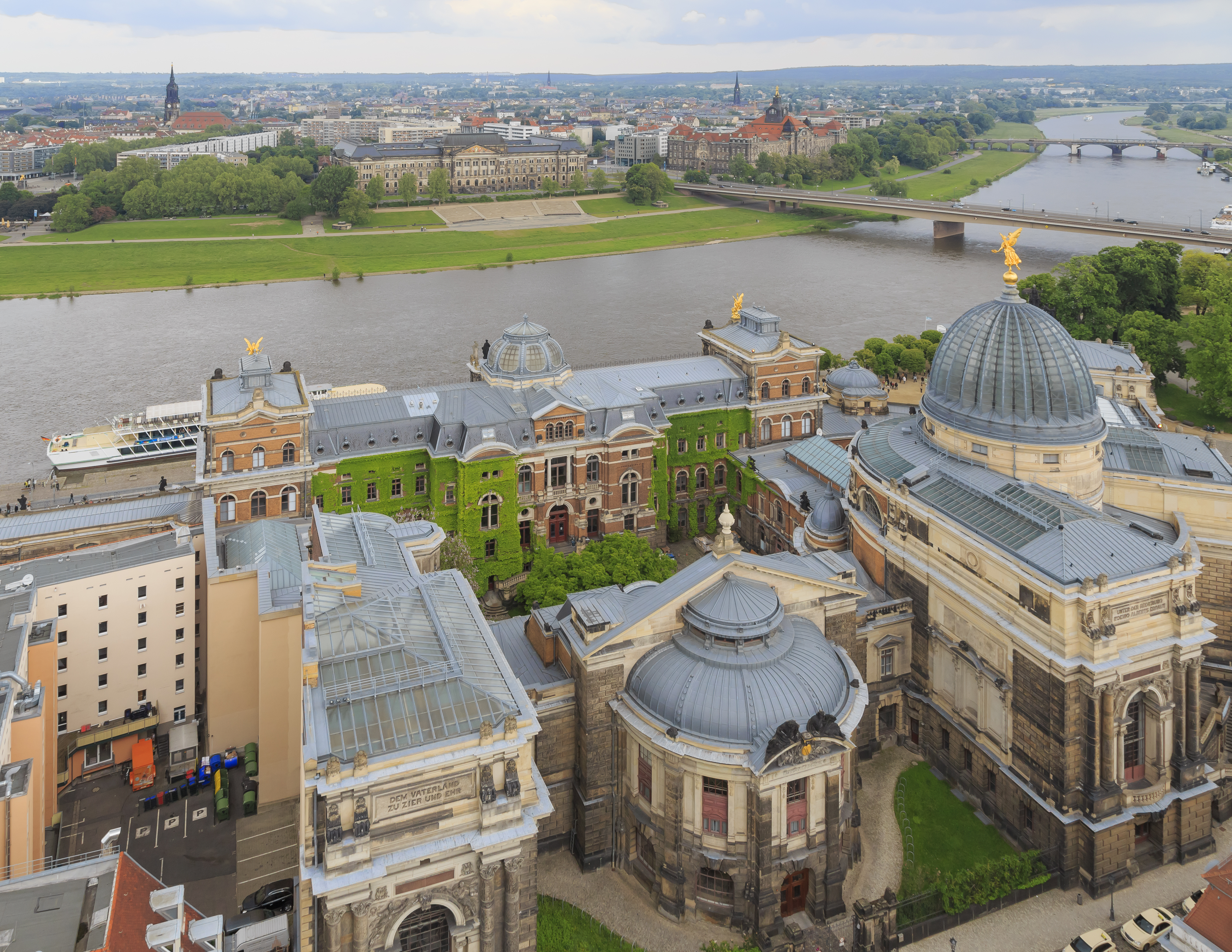
Dresden Academy of Fine Arts

=== Universities ===
Dresden is home to a number of renowned universities, but among German cities it is a more recent location for academic education.

- The Dresden University of Technology (Technische Universität Dresden, abbreviated as TU Dresden or TUD) with more than 36,000 students (2011) was founded in 1828 and is among the oldest and largest Universities of Technology in Germany. It is currently the university of technology in Germany with the largest number of students but also has many courses in social studies, economics and other non-technical sciences. It offers 126 courses. In 2006, the TU Dresden was successful in the German Universities Excellence Initiative of the Federal Ministry of Education and Research (Germany).
- The Dresden University of Applied Sciences (Hochschule für Technik und Wirtschaft Dresden) was founded in 1992 and had about 5,300 students in 2005.
- The Dresden Academy of Fine Arts (Hochschule für Bildende Künste Dresden) was founded in 1764 and is known for its former professors and artists such as George Grosz, Sascha Schneider, Otto Dix, Oskar Kokoschka, Bernardo Bellotto, Carl-Gustav Carus, Caspar David Friedrich and Gerhard Richter.
- The Palucca School of Dance (Palucca Hochschule für Tanz) was founded by Gret Palucca in 1925 and is a major European school of free dance.
- The Carl Maria von Weber College of Music was founded in 1856.

Other universities include the Hochschule für Kirchenmusik, a school specialising in church music, and the Evangelische Hochschule für Sozialarbeit, an education institution for social work. The Dresden International University is a private postgraduate university, founded in 2003 in cooperation with the Dresden University of Technology.

=== Research institutes ===
Dresden hosts many research institutes, some of which have gained an international standing. The domains of most importance are micro- and nanoelectronics, transport and infrastructure systems, material and photonic technology, and bio-engineering. The institutes are well connected among one other as well as with the academic education institutions.

Helmholtz-Zentrum Dresden-Rossendorf is the largest complex of research facilities in Dresden, a short distance outside the urban areas. It focuses on nuclear medicine and physics. As part of the Helmholtz Association it is one of the German Big Science research centres.

The Max Planck Society focuses on fundamental research. There are three Max Planck Institutes (MPI) in Dresden: the MPI of Molecular Cell Biology and Genetics, the MPI for Chemical Physics of Solids, and the MPI for the Physics of Complex Systems.

The Fraunhofer Society hosts institutes of applied research that also offer mission-oriented research to enterprises. With eleven institutions or parts of institutes, Dresden is the largest location of the Fraunhofer Society worldwide. The Fraunhofer Society has become an important factor in location decisions and is seen as a useful part of the "knowledge infrastructure".

The Leibniz Community is a union of institutes with science covering fundamental research and applied research. In Dresden there are three Leibniz Institutes. The Leibniz Institute for Polymer Research and the Leibniz Institute for Solid State and Materials Research are both in the material and high-technology domain, while the Leibniz Institute for Ecological Urban and Regional Development is focused on more fundamental research into urban planning. The Helmholtz-Zentrum Dresden-Rossendorf was member of the Leibniz Community until the end of 2010.

=== Higher secondary education ===
Dresden has more than 20 gymnasia which prepare for a tertiary education, five of which are private. The Sächsisches Landesgymnasium für Musik with a focus on music is supported, as its name implies by the State of Saxony, rather than by the city. There are some Berufliche Gymnasien which combine vocational education and secondary education and an Abendgymnasium which prepares higher education of adults avocational.

== Sport ==
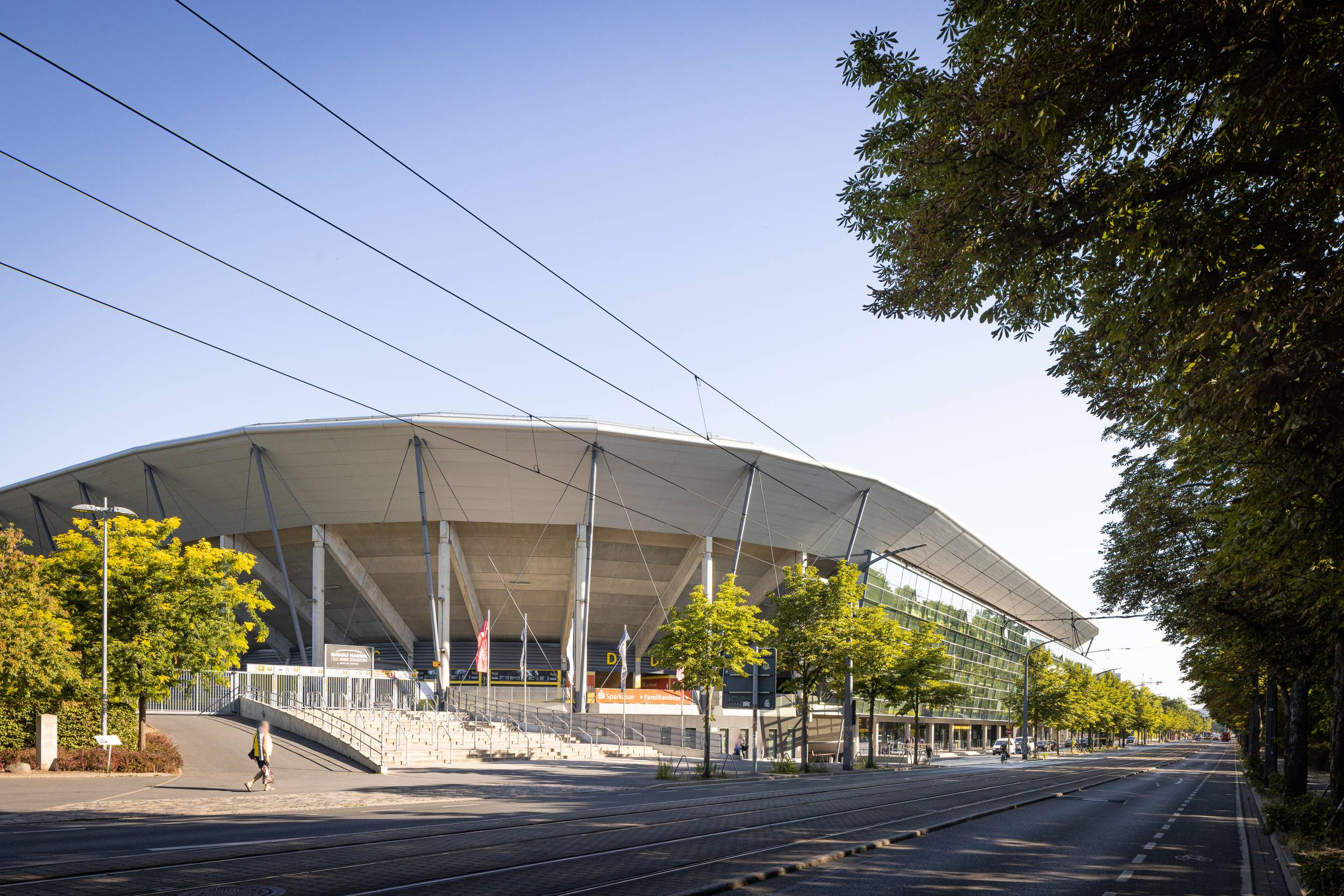
The Rudolf-Harbig-Stadion, the current home of Dynamo Dresden

Dresden is home to Dynamo Dresden, which had a tradition in UEFA club competitions up to the early 1990s. Dynamo Dresden won eight titles in the DDR-Oberliga. Currently, the club is a member of the 2. Bundesliga after some seasons in the Bundesliga and 3. Liga.

In the early 20th century, the city was represented by Dresdner SC, who were one of Germany's most successful clubs in football. Their best performances came during World War II, when they were twice German champions, and twice Cup winners. Dresdner SC is a multisport club. While its football team plays in the sixth-tier Landesliga Sachsen, its volleyball section has a team in the women's Bundesliga. Dresden has a third football team SC Borea Dresden.

ESC Dresdner Eislöwen is an ice hockey club playing in the second-tier ice hockey league DEL2.

Dresden Monarchs are an American football team in the German Football League.

The Dresden Titans are the city's top basketball team. Due to good performances, they have moved up several divisions and currently play in Germany's second division ProA. The Titans' home arena is the Margon Arena.

Since 1890, horse races have taken place and the Dresdener Rennverein 1890 e.V. are active and one of the big sporting events in Dresden.

Major sporting facilities in Dresden are the Rudolf-Harbig-Stadion, the Heinz-Steyer-Stadion and the EnergieVerbund Arena for ice hockey.

== Twin towns – sister cities ==
Dresden and Coventry became twins after World War II in an act of reconciliation, as both had suffered near-total destruction from massive aerial bombings. Similar symbolism occurred in 1988, when Dresden twinned with the Dutch city of Rotterdam. The Coventry Blitz and Rotterdam Blitz bombardments by the German Luftwaffe are also considered to be disproportional.

Dresden has had a triangular partnership with Saint Petersburg and Hamburg since 1987. Dresden is twinned with:

- Coventry, England (1959)
- Saint Petersburg, Russia (1961)
- Wrocław, Poland (1963)
- Skopje, North Macedonia (1967)
- Ostrava, Czech Republic (1971)
- Brazzaville, Congo (1975)
- Florence, Italy (1978)
- Hamburg, Germany (1987)
- Rotterdam, Netherlands (1988)
- Strasbourg, France (1990)
- Salzburg, Austria (1991)
- Columbus, United States (1992)
- Rouen, France (1994)
- Hangzhou, China (2009)

=== Friendly cities ===
Dresden also has friendly relations with:

- Daejeon, South Korea
- Gostyń, Poland
- Huế, Vietnam
- Shiraz, Iran

== Notable people ==
=== Public service ===
- Augustus II the Strong (1670–1733), Elector of Saxony and King of Poland.
- Augustus III of Poland (1696–1763), Elector of Saxony and King of Poland.
- Frederick Augustus I of Saxony (1750–1827), King of Saxony.
- Anthony of Saxony (1755–1836), King of Saxony
- Count Heinrich von Bellegarde (1756–1845), Generalfeldmarschall and statesman.
- Johann Adolf, Freiherr von Thielmann (1765–1824), Prussian cavalry soldier.
- Wilhelm Adolf Becker (1796–1846), classical scholar.
- Frederick Augustus II of Saxony (1797–1854), King of Saxony.
- John, King of Saxony (1801–1873), King of Saxony.
- Edwin Freiherr von Manteuffel (1809–1885), Prussian general field marshal.
- Albert, King of Saxony (1828–1902), King of Saxony.
- George, King of Saxony (1832–1904), King of Saxony.
- Heinrich Gotthard Freiherr von Treitschke (1834–1896), historian, political writer and nationalist
- Ernst Brandes (1862–1935), German lawyer, estate manager and politician
- Frederick Augustus III of Saxony (1865–1932), King of Saxony
- Amelie Beese (1886–1925), aviator
- Max Immelmann (1890–1916), WWI fighter pilot, first pilot awarded the Pour le Mérite, known as the "Blue Max"
- Herbert Wehner (1906–1990), politician (SPD)
- Wolfgang Bergold (1913–1987), East German politician and diplomat
- Wolfgang Mischnick (1921–2002), politician (FDP)
- Peter Hoffmann (1930–2023), historian
- Gerhart Baum (1932–2025), politician (FDP)
- Andreas von Bülow (born 1937), politician and writer
- Christine Bergmann (born 1939), politician (SPD)
- Katja Kipping (born 1978), politician (The Left)

=== Academics ===
- Ehrenfried Walther von Tschirnhaus (1651–1708), German mathematician, physicist, physician, and philosopher
- Christoph M. Kimmich (born 1939), German-American historian and eighth President of Brooklyn College
- Gert Jäger (born 1935), translation scholar

=== Arts ===
- August Buchner (1591–1661), influential Baroque poet
- August Joseph Pechwell (1757–1811), painter
- Theodor Körner (1791–1813), poet and soldier.
- Moritz Hauptmann (1792–1868), music theorist, teacher and composer.
- Ludwig Richter (1803–1884), painter
- Amalie Scholl (1823–1879), German composer
- Hans von Bülow (1830–1894), conductor, virtuoso pianist and composer.
- Georgina Schubert (1840–1878), composer and singer
- Paul Miersch (1868–1956), composer
- Elsa Laura Wolzogen (1876–1945), composer
- Victor Klemperer (1881–1960), Jewish author of I Will Bear Witness
- Erich Kästner (1899–1974), author of books
- Carle Hessay (1911–1978), Canadian painter
- Siegfried Geißler (1929–2014), composer, conductor, hornist and politician
- Gerhard Richter (born 1932), painter
- Gernot Roll (1939–2020), cinematographer, film director and script writer
- Thomas Fritsch (1944–2021), film, television and dubbing actor
- Erik Simon (born 1950), German science fiction writer, editor of anthologies of science fiction, literary critic of science fiction, and translator
- Andrea Ihle (born 1953), operatic soprano
- Martha Irmler, ballet dancer
- Annette Jahns (1958–2020), operatic mezzo-soprano and contralto, and opera director
- Durs Grünbein (born 1962), poet and writer
- Siarhei Mikhalok (born 1972), Belarusian rock musician and actor

=== Science and business ===
- Georg Bartisch (ca.1535 – 1607), eye surgeon and author of first German-language textbook of ophthalmology
- Carl Friedrich Wenzel (ca.1740 – 1793), chemist and metallurgist.
- Georg Amadeus Carl Friedrich Naumann (1797–1873), mineralogist and geologist.
- Otto Linné Erdmann (1804–1869), chemist, introduced vaccination into Saxony.
- Ferdinand A. Lange (1815–1875), watchmaker, founder of A. Lange & Söhne
- Julius Hermann Moritz Busch (1821–1899), publicist; "Bismarck's Boswell".
- Ernst Engel (1821–1896), statistician and economist; Engel curve & Engel's law.
- Melitta Bentz (1873–1950), inventor of the coffee filter.
- Karl Reinisch (1921–2007), engineer
- Edith Schönert-Geiß (1933–2012), numismatist
- Marie Simon (1824–1877), nurse
- Reinhart Heinrich (1946–2006), biophysicist

=== Sport ===
- Kurt Hitke (1889–1979), American racing driver
- Heinz Melkus (1928–2005), racing driver and founder of Melkus
- Curt Rottman (1886–1928), Olympic gymnast
- Matthias Sammer (born 1967), footballer and football coach
- Ad Santel (1887–1966), professional wrestler
- Helmut Schön (1915–1996), football coach
- Wolfgang Seidel (1926–1987), racing driver
- Fritz Wiessner (1900–1988), pioneer of free climbing
- Axel Tischer (born 1986), professional wrestler

== See also ==
- Outline of Dresden
