= City Council of Dresden =

City council in Saxony, Germany

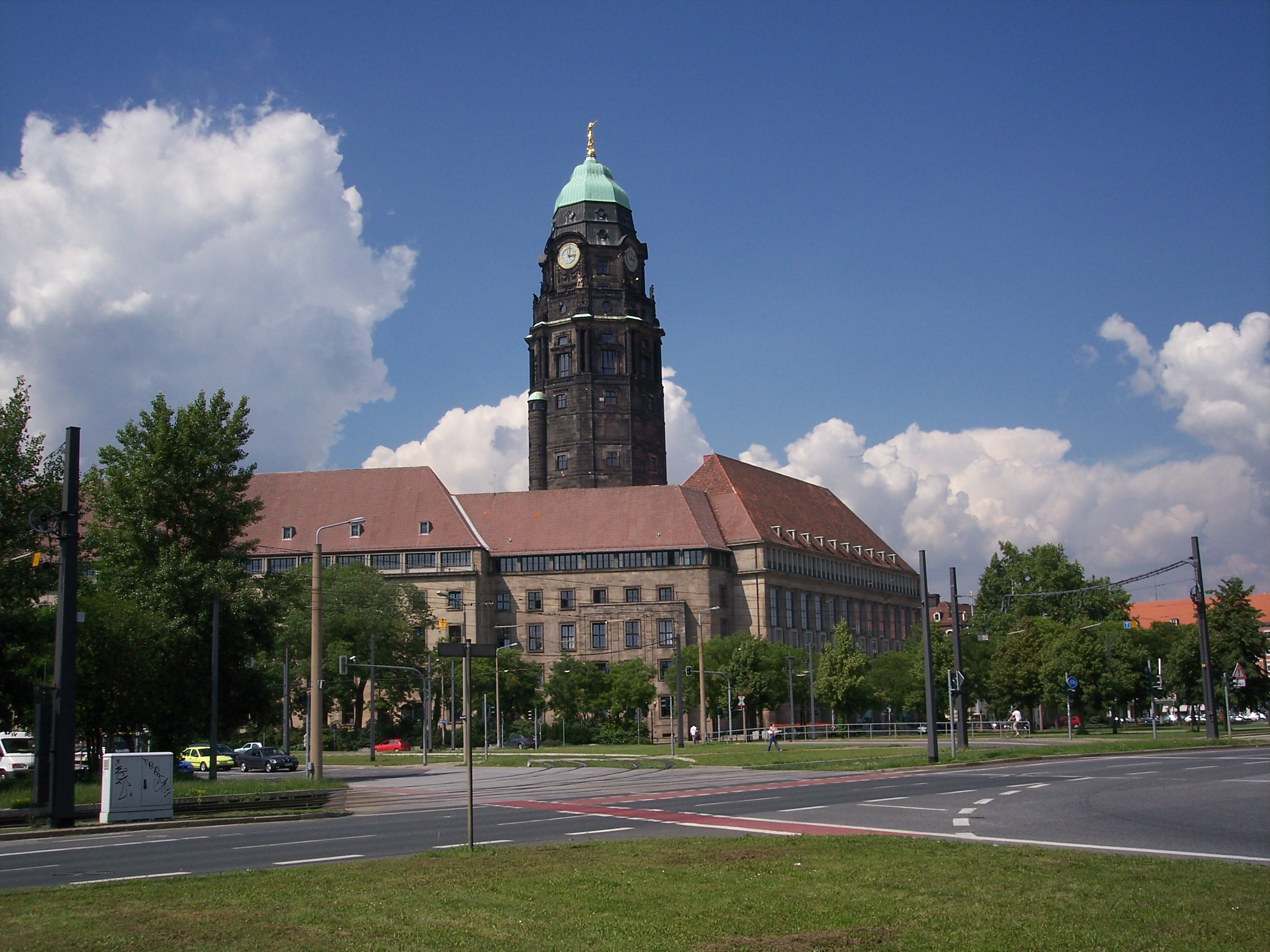
The New Town Hall

The City Council of Dresden is the elected legislative body of the city of Dresden in the German state of Saxony. It exercises statutory powers and issues generally applicable regulations, defines the principles, and makes the decisions according to which the city administration (headed by the Lord Mayor) must act.

== Municipality and city council ==
=== City council ===
The city council defines the basic principles of the municipality by decrees and statutes. The council gives orders to the burgomaster by voting for resolutions and thus has some executive power. It is elected by the citizenry for a legislature of five years by an election system of three votes per citizen. There an advisory councils for local affairs of senior citizens and immigrants. The ten Ortsamtsbereiche (districts) have an advisory council which has to be heard in district affairs. The Ortschaften (former boroughs) have even smaller councils, which can decide even more freely in local affairs.

As of 2024, the 70 seats of the city council were distributed as follows:

| Party | Number of seats |
|---|---|
| Alternative for Germany | 14 |
| Christian Democratic Union | 13 |
| Alliance '90/The Greens | 10 |
| Social Democratic Party of Germany | 6 |
| Sahra Wagenknecht Alliance (BSW) | 5 |
| The Left | 5 |
| Free Democratic Party | 2 |
| Free Voters | 2 |
| Pirate Party Germany | 2 |
| Free Saxons (FS) | 1 |
| Die PARTEI | 1 |
| Dissidents Dresden (DissDD) | 1 |
| Free Citizens Dresden (FBD) | 1 |
| Volt Germany (Volt) | 1 |

=== City Mayors ===
The Supreme Burgomaster is directly elected by the citizens for a term of seven years. Executive functions are normally elected indirectly in Germany. However, the Supreme Burgomaster shares a lot of executive rights with the city council. Governing majorities can be in opposition to the Supreme Burgomaster. He is the head of the municipality, is responsible for the city's operative affairs, and is ceremonial representative of the city. The highest departments of the municipality are managed by seven burgomasters. The First Burgomaster (currently the burgomaster of culture) is also the deputy to the Supreme Burgomaster.

The current holder of the office is Dirk Hilbert (Free Democratic Party); he was elected in July 2015 by 54 per cent of the vote.

=== Municipality ===
The municipality is divided into seven departments and the Mayor's Office.

- The department of general administration is responsible for the municipality's civil servants, information technology and the administration of the schools in the city.
- The department of finance and real estates is responsible for the city treasury. The city agencies of real estates, taxes and civil engineering are responsible to that department.
- The department of public order and security is responsible for fire and civil protection, food control and the hospitals in the city. The city agencies of public order and law, as well as the civil registry office, are responsible to that department.
- The department of culture is responsible for the municipal museums and libraries. The agency of monument conservation is responsible to that department. A lot of the cultural institutions in Dresden are directly responsible to the Free State of Saxony, as are the state art collections and the opera house.
- The department of social affairs is responsible for the municipal kindergartens. The agencies of youth welfare, health and social welfare are responsible to that department. Social welfare is a matter of the cities and communities in Germany.
- The department of urban development is responsible for mobility and central technical services. The agency of city development, construction inspection, land surveying and streets and excavation are responsible to that department.
- The department of economy is responsible for the wastewater and the cemeteries. The agencies of business development, green spaces and wasting as well as the environmental agency are responsible to that department.

The City of Dresden owns a lot of institutions and enterprises. Some of them are private companies (for example the Dresdner Verkehrsbetriebe (transport authorities), the DREWAG (public services and energy supply), the Messe Dresden (fair ground) or the Zoo Dresden (which is a non-profit GmbH: a limited liability company).

== Local affairs ==
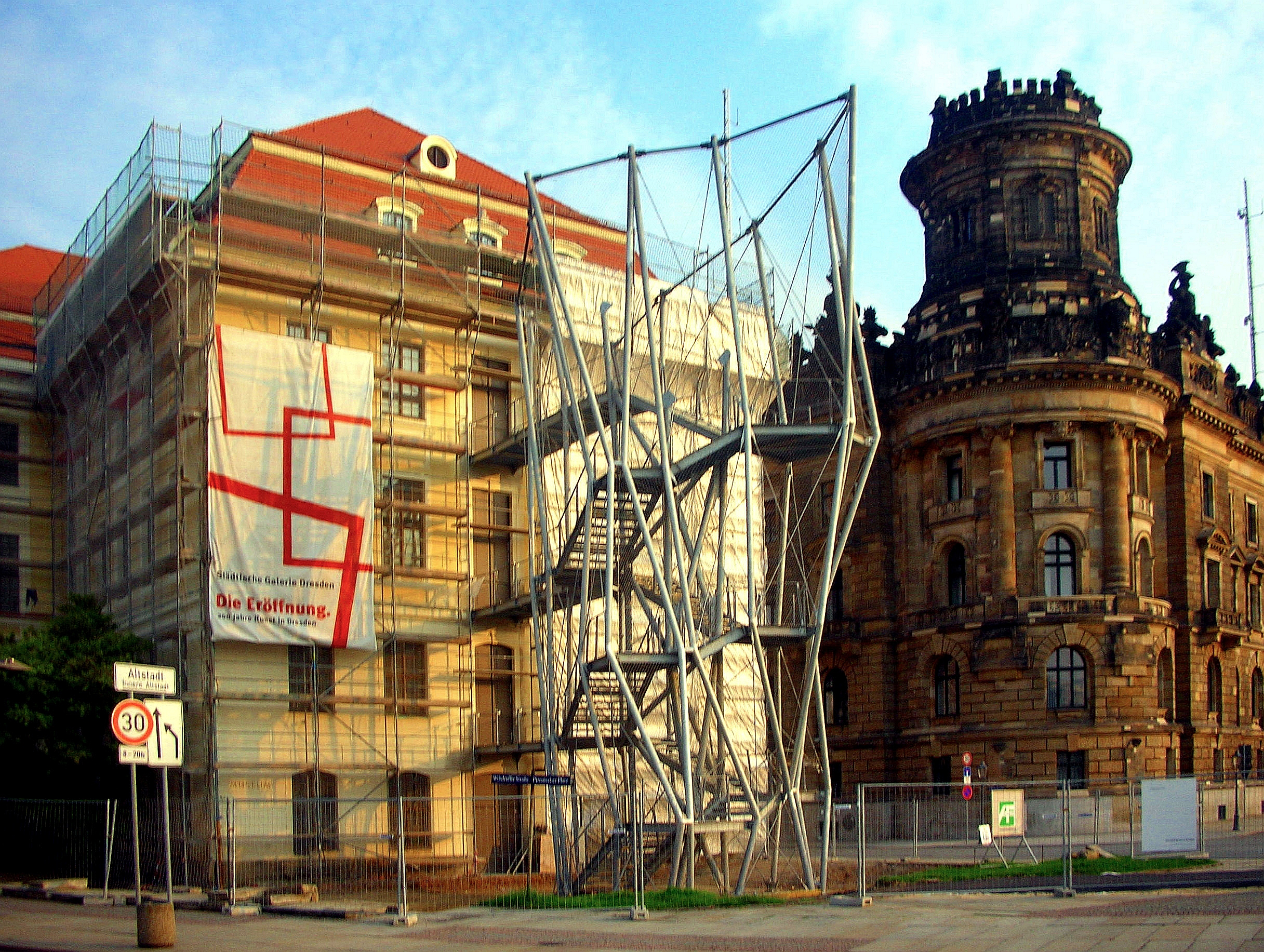
Architecture (like the deconstructivistic fire escape on the baroque Landhaus) is a persistent subject of controversy in Dresden

Local affairs in Dresden often center around the urban development of the city. Architecture and design of public places is a specifically controversial subject. The reconstruction of completely destroyed buildings around the Frauenkirche at the Neumarkt square as well as the completely modern Wiener Platz square in front of the Hauptbahnhof train station have been criticized. The building of the Waldschlösschen Bridge led the UNESCO World Heritage Committee to remove the Dresden Elbe Valley from the list of World Heritage Sites.

In 2006 Dresden sold its publicly subsidized housing organization, WOBA Dresden GmbH, to the US-based private investment company Fortress Investment Group. The city received 987.1 Million Euros and paid off its remaining loans, making it the first large city in Germany to become debt free. Opponents to the sale were concerned about Dresden's loss of control on the subsidized housing market, with that control going to an American private company. The long-term risks were a subject of discussion in national media as were the chances of such sales in other cities.

A new soccer stadium, the Glücksgas Stadium, was built between 2007 and 2010.

== Coat of arms ==
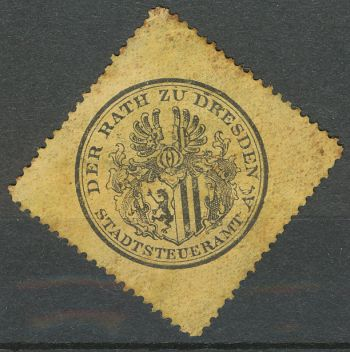
Seal of Dresden used by the city council in 1900

Official documents and publications by the City Council of Dresden still use the histrionic coat of arms: Showing on a golden shield showing a black lion with and two black pales. The lion is looking has a red tongue.

== Last election results ==
=== 2024 ===
==== Mayoral ====
Results of the second round of the 2022 mayoral election

The most recent mayoral election was held on 12 June 2022, with a runoff held on 10 July, and the results were as follows:

| Candidate | Party | First round | | Second round | |
| Candidate | Party | Votes | % | Votes | % |
|---|---|---|---|---|---|
| Dirk Hilbert | Independent Citizens for Dresden (FDP, FW, CDU) | 66,165 | 32.5 | 80,483 | 45.3 |
| Eva Jähnigen | Alliance 90/The Greens (plus SPD, Left, Pirates in the runoff) | 38,473 | 18.9 | 67,947 | 38.3 |
| Albrecht Pallas | Social Democratic Party | 31,068 | 15.2 | Withdrew | |
| Maximilian Krah | Alternative for Germany | 28,971 | 14.2 | 21,741 | 12.2 |
| André Schollbach | The Left | 20,898 | 10.3 | Withdrew | |
| Marcus Fuchs | Independent | 6,856 | 3.4 | 3,549 | 2.0 |
| Martin Schulte-Wissermann | Pirate Party | 5,975 | 2.9 | Withdrew | |
| Sascha Wolff | Independent | 2,695 | 1.3 | Withdrew | |
| Jan Pöhnisch | Die PARTEI | 2,684 | 1.3 | 3,824 | 2.2 |
| Valid votes | | 203,785 | 99.4 | 177,544 | 99.5 |
| Invalid votes | | 1,145 | 0.6 | 974 | 0.5 |
| Total | | 204,930 | 100.0 | 178,518 | 100.0 |
| Electorate/voter turnout | | 432,294 | 47.4 | 431,967 | 41.3 |

==== City council ====
Strongest party by locality in the 2024 City Council election

The most recent city council election was held on 9 June 2024, and the results were as follows:

| Party | Votes | % | +/- | Seats | +/- |
|---|---|---|---|---|---|
| Alternative for Germany (AfD) | 170,346 | 19.4 | ▲2.3 | 14 | ▲2 |
| Christian Democratic Union (CDU) | 157,717 | 18.0 | ▼0.3 | 13 | 0 |
| Alliance 90/The Greens (Grüne) | 128,099 | 14.6 | ▼5.9 | 10 | ▼5 |
| Social Democratic Party (SPD) | 78,652 | 9.0 | ▲0.2 | 6 | 0 |
| Team Zastrow/Alliance Saxony 24 | 71,163 | 8.1 | New | 6 | New |
| The Left (Die Linke) | 68,012 | 7.8 | ▼8.4 | 5 | ▼7 |
| Sahra Wagenknecht Alliance (BSW) | 63,108 | 7.2 | New | 5 | New |
| Free Voters Dresden (WV) | 31,110 | 3.5 | ▼1.8 | 2 | ▼2 |
| Pirate Party Germany (Piraten) | 27,736 | 3.2 | ▲0.8 | 2 | ▲1 |
| Free Democratic Party (FDP) | 24,464 | 2.8 | ▼4.7 | 2 | ▼3 |
| Die PARTEI (PARTEI) | 16,363 | 1.9 | ▲0.1 | 1 | ▲1 |
| Free Saxons (FS) | 13,304 | 1.5 | New | 1 | New |
| Volt Germany (Volt) | 10,522 | 1.2 | New | 1 | New |
| Dissidents Dresden (DissDD) | 8,365 | 1.0 | New | 1 | New |
| Free Citizens Dresden (FBD) | 8,290 | 0.9 | ▼0.6 | 1 | 0 |
| Valid votes | 877,251 | 96.3 | | | |
| Invalid votes | 3,802 | 1.3 | | | |
| Total | 303,717 | 100.0 | | 70 | ±0 |
| Electorate/voter turnout | 429,280 | 70.8 | ▲3.9 | | |

=== 2019 ===
Results of the 2019 city council election

Winning party by locality in the 2019 city council election

The most recent city council election was held on 26 May 2019, and the results were as follows:

| Party | Votes | % | +/- | Seats | +/- |
|---|---|---|---|---|---|
| Alliance 90/The Greens (Grüne) | 171,630 | 20.5 | ▲4.8 | 15 | ▲4 |
| Christian Democratic Union (CDU) | 153,022 | 18.3 | ▼9.3 | 13 | ▼8 |
| Alternative for Germany (AfD) | 143,207 | 17.2 | ▲10.1 | 12 | ▲7 |
| The Left (Die Linke) | 135,613 | 16.2 | ▼4.7 | 12 | ▼3 |
| Social Democratic Party (SPD) | 73,627 | 8.8 | ▼4.0 | 6 | ▼3 |
| Free Democratic Party (FDP) | 62,613 | 7.5 | ▲2.5 | 5 | ▲2 |
| Free Voters Dresden (WV) | 44,725 | 5.3 | ▲5.2 | 4 | ▲4 |
| Pirate Party Germany (Piraten) | 20,516 | 2.4 | ▼0.9 | 1 | ▼1 |
| Die PARTEI (PARTEI) | 15,268 | 1.8 | ▲0.9 | 1 | ▲1 |
| Free Citizens Dresden (FBD) | 12,652 | 1.5 | ▼2.3 | 1 | ▼1 |
| National Democratic Party (NPD) | 4,744 | 0.6 | ▼2.2 | 0 | ▼2 |
| Valid votes | 288,060 | 98.7 | | | |
| Invalid votes | 3,937 | 1.3 | | | |
| Total | 291,997 | 100.0 | | 70 | ±0 |
| Electorate/voter turnout | 436,179 | 66.9 | ▲17.9 | | |
Source: Wahlen in Sachsen
