= Maximilian Krah =

German lawyer and politician (born 1977)

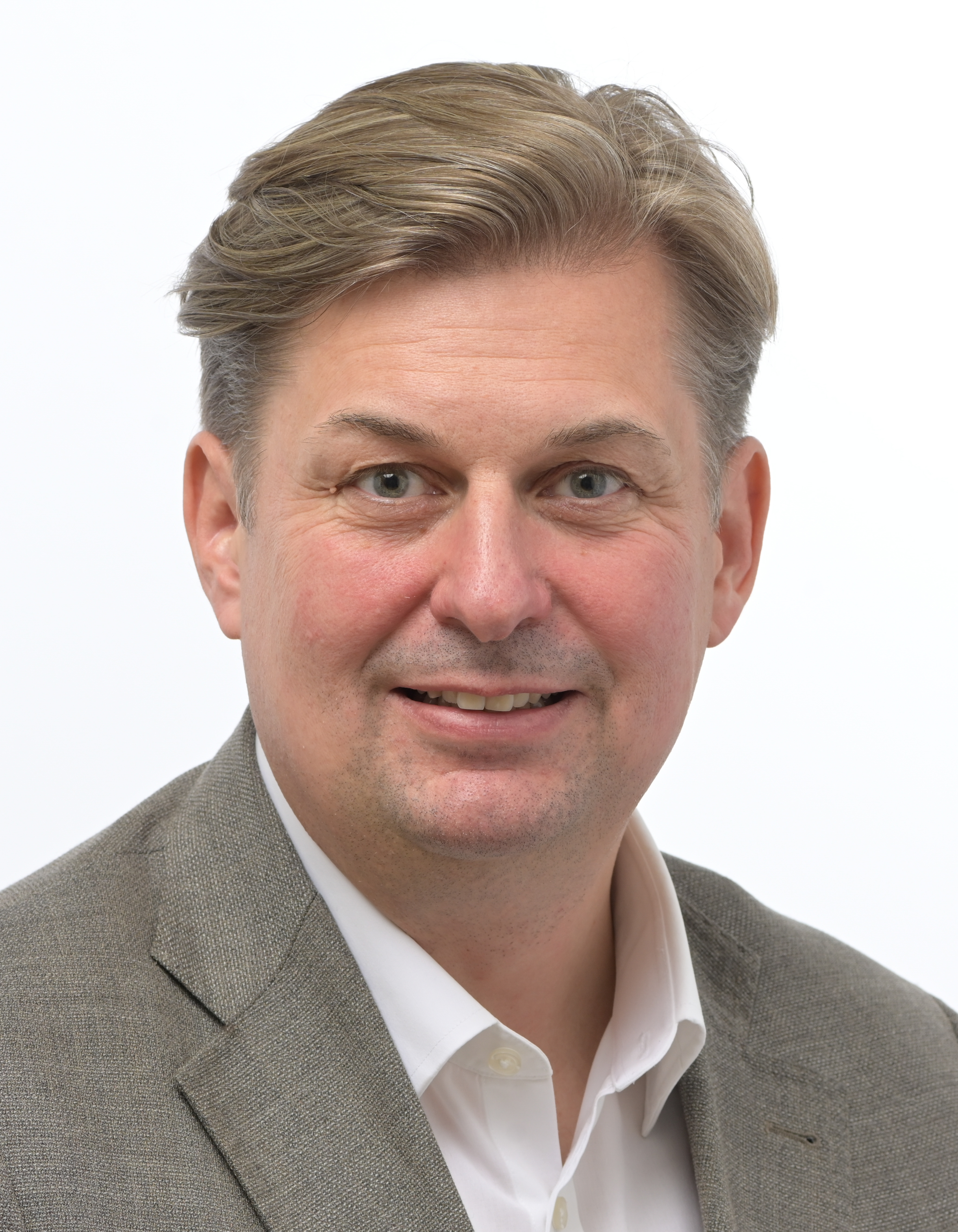
- Official portrait, 2024

Member of the Bundestag
- Incumbent
- Assumed office 25 March 2025
- Preceded by: Mike Moncsek
- Constituency: Chemnitzer Umland – Erzgebirgskreis II

Member of the European Parliament for Germany
- In office 2 July 2019 – 24 March 2025
- Succeeded by: Volker Schnurrbusch

Personal details
- Born: Maximilian Eugen Krah; 28 January 1977 (age 49) Räckelwitz, Bezirk Dresden, East Germany
- Party: AfD (since 2016)
- Other political affiliations: CDU (1991–2016)
- Children: 8
- Education: Technical University of Dresden (Dr. iur.); London Business School; Columbia Business School (MBA)
- Occupation: Lawyer • politician

Maximilian Eugen Krah (born 28 January 1977) is a German lawyer and politician for the far-right political party Alternative for Germany (AfD). He served as a Member of the European Parliament (MEP) from 2019 until March 2025 when he was elected as a Member of the Bundestag for the Chemnitzer Umland – Erzgebirgskreis II constituency.

In April 2024, Krah gained international attention when the German Prosecutor General arrested one of his parliamentary aides, suspected of spying for China by passing on information about negotiations and decisions in the European Parliament to China's intelligence service. This and comments Krah made about the Nazi era in a subsequent media interview were seen by observers as having triggered the decision by the European parliamentarian group Identity and Democracy (ID) to exclude the AfD from membership on 23 May 2024. Since then, Krah has sat with the non-attached members. In September 2025, parliamentary immunity for Krah was lifted and police searched his home and offices.

== Biography ==
Krah was born in Räckelwitz and grew up in Upper Lusatia as the youngest of three children. His mother was a teacher and his father Peter Krah was an engineer, an executive for the local chapter of the Christian Democratic Union and later an advisor to the Ministry for Interior and Sports of Lower Saxony. After high school and military service, Krah studied law at the Technical University of Dresden followed by an MBA at the London Business School and the Columbia Business School in New York. He ran a law firm in Dresden with two colleagues.

As a young lawyer, Krah worked for the Traditionalist-Catholic SSPX, setting up a network including a foundation in Austria as well as companies in Switzerland and Liechtenstein. According to Krah, he first came into contact with SSPX in 2005, and later worked for the "Generalhaus," the international headquarters of the SSPX in Switzerland. In 2008, he set up the non-profit Jaidhofer Foundation in Vienna, to preserve the castle and manage the assets bequeathed by Rosa Gutmann to the SSPX.

Krah lives in Dresden. He is a practising Catholic, is widowed and has eight children by three women.

== Political career ==
Krah joined the Junge Union in 1991, the youth wing of the CDU. During his studies he was also active in the Association of Christian Democratic Students. Krah left the CDU in 2016. In that same year, Krah joined Alternative for Germany and was elected deputy chairman of the AfD Saxony in February 2018.

In 2019, Krah was elected as an MEP for the AfD. In the European Parliament he sat as a member of the Identity and Democracy group and is a member of the committees for Relations with the United States, International Trade (INTA) and Deputy Member of the Delegation to the Euronest Parliamentary Assembly. He also served as the spokesman for the AfD in the European Parliament until 2022.

Krah ran for the election on 12 June 2022 as Mayor of Dresden. He received 14.2 percent of the votes and came in 4th place behind Mayor Dirk Hilbert, Eva Jähnigen and Albrecht Pallas. In the second round of voting, Krah lost again with 12.2 percent, coming in third place behind Dirk Hilbert and Eva Jähnigen.

In July 2023 he was named as the AfD top candidate in the 2024 European Parliament election. The AfD received 15.9 percent and mathematically gained 15 seats. One day after the European elections it was announced that the AfD's top candidate, Maximilian Krah, would not be part of the future AfD delegation to the European Parliament. The newly elected MPs voted at their inaugural meeting for a motion not to include Krah.

In the 2025 German federal election, Krah ran in Saxony's Chemnitzer Umland – Erzgebirgskreis II electoral district and won the election with 44,2 % of the constituency vote. He became part of the AfD delegation to the German Parliament.

On 11 September 2025, the Bundestag voted in favor of lifting Krah's parliamentary immunity amid investigations into his alleged involvement with China, corruption and espionage. Shortly afterwards, his residence and offices in Berlin, Dresden and Brussels were searched by police following an order from the Dresden Higher Regional Court.

== Political positions ==
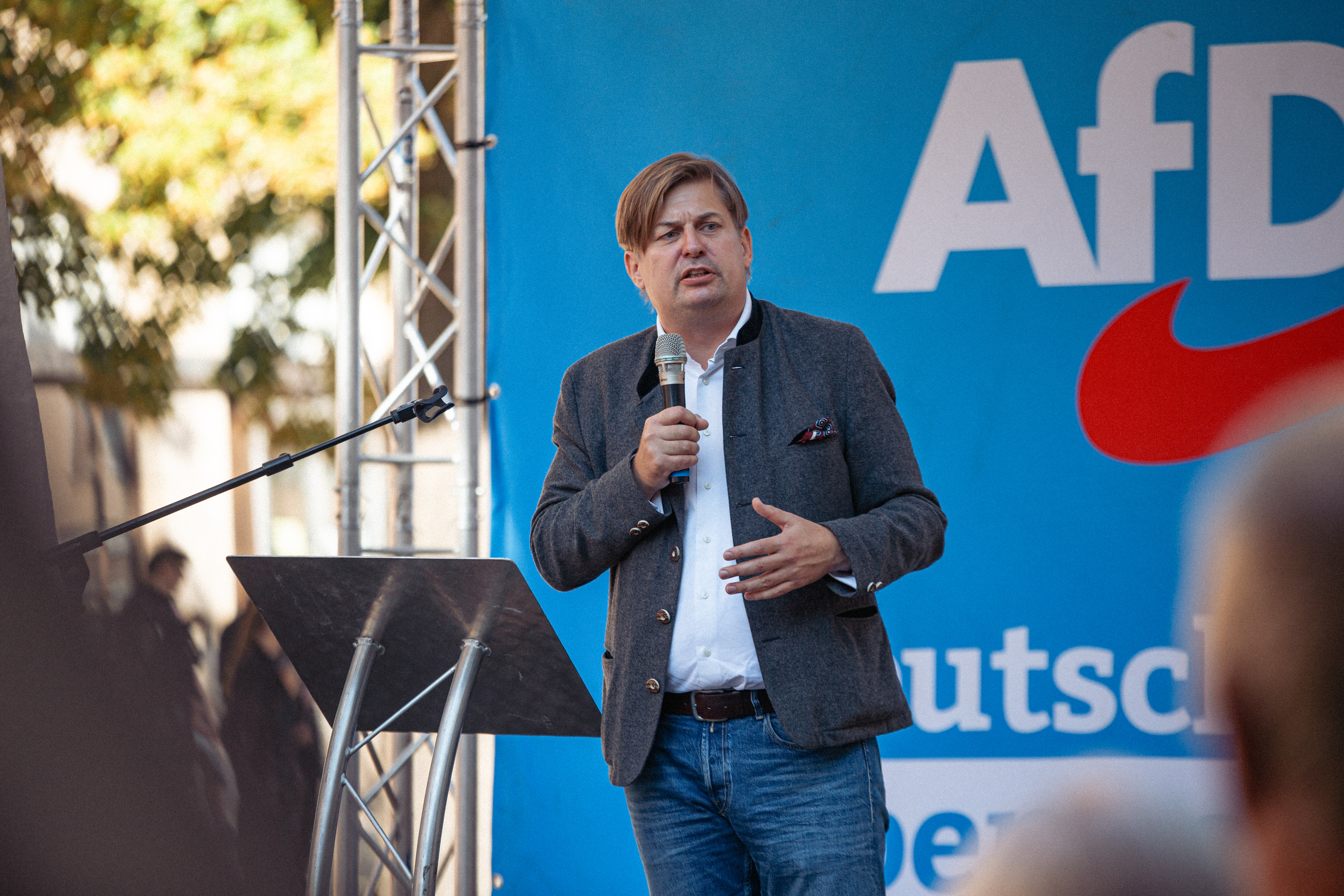
Krah at an AfD campaign in Nordhausen, Thuringia in 2023

Krah rejects the term "conservative" for himself and the AfD; he clearly describes his political affiliation as "right-wing". Within the party, Krah is considered a follower of Der Flügel within the AfD under the informal leadership of Björn Höcke, a regional leader of the party in Thuringia. Höcke also supported Krah's candidacy as the AfD's top candidate for the 2024 European elections.

Krah has given several lectures at Götz Kubitschek's "Institute for State Policy (IfS)", which the Federal Office for the Protection of the Constitution has classified as "certainly right-wing extremist". In 2023, Krah also had his book Politics from the Right published by Verlag Antaios; according to AfD Bundestag member Norbert Kleinwächter, it is a manifesto that is explicitly "anti-rule of law, anti-international law, anti-ethical".

Since the 2024 election, Krah has distanced himself from his most radical stances, calling for a more civic nationalist approach within the AfD and supporting good relations with the muslim state of Turkey . This has caused some dissatisfaction with the movement as most militants prefer Björn Höcke and Ulrich Siegmund's vision.

=== European Green Deal ===
In July 2023, Krah criticized the European Green Deal and warned against the deindustrialization of Europe.

=== Nazi Germany ===
In a May 2024 interview with Italian newspaper La Repubblica, Krah argued that not all members of the Waffen-SS should be judged as criminals, citing the example of Günter Grass, a former Nobel Prize winner for literature and member of the Waffen-SS, and added "I would never say that anyone who wore an SS uniform was automatically a criminal" and, "Among the 900,000 SS, there were also many peasants: there was certainly a high percentage of criminals, but not only that." The interview was said to have caused a further decline in already strained relations between the AfD and the French National Rally who both sit within the Identity and Democracy group. In response to Krah's statements and allegations of Chinese influence on the AfD, members of the National Rally followed by Italy's League and the Czech Freedom and Direct Democracy announced they would part ways with the AfD and cease formal collaboration with the party after the 2024 European Parliament election, while the Danish People's Party issued an ultimatum that the AfD could only stay with the group if Krah was expelled. The Flemish Vlaams Belang declined to support expulsion of the AfD from the ID group or rule out further cooperation with the AfD, but criticized Krah's remarks and said it would wait until after the election before making a decision. The AfD was expelled on 23 May with immediate effect.

Krah wrote on Twitter that his statements had been quoted out of context and were being "misused" to hurt the AfD's campaign, but added that he would resign from the AfD's executive board and not make any further campaign appearances.

=== Foreign policy ===
Krah rejects the European Union. He calls for a "great reset" for the EU, and called the European Union a "vassal of the United States".

In August 2026, Krah visited Northern Cyprus, where he met with Assembly Speaker Ziya Ozturkler. He said that he is "aware of the historical dimension of what the Turkish Cypriot people have experienced" and that the "difficulties faced by Turkish Cypriots are unacceptable. They cannot travel anywhere in the world without a second passport and cannot participate in sporting events", and called for greater contacts between Germany and Northern Cyprus.

==== China ====
In 2019, Krah voted against a European parliamentary resolution in calling on China to end the persecution of Uyghurs, calling criticism of China's human rights record "anti-Chinese propaganda".

In November 2022, the Global Times, a tabloid newspaper owned by the Chinese Communist Party, published a long interview with Krah. Regarding the Russian invasion of Ukraine, Krah said: "Fighting America's wars is not in our interest and not in the interest of the Ukrainians." He also said that cooperation between Russia, China, Brazil and the EU would be more attractive "than a new Cold War under the leadership of the USA".

Krah congratulated the 70th anniversary of the People's Republic of China in a video. He also congratulated China on the 70th anniversary of the annexation of Tibet by the People's Republic of China: "You are now celebrating 70 years of the Tibet Autonomous Region, I think you have every reason to be proud of what you have achieved." Krah also believes that Taiwan belongs to China under international law.

In 2023, Krah traveled to China at the expense of the Chinese government. He had several conversations with the International Department of the Chinese Communist Party. He later campaigned for Chinese economic interests in Germany, going against the line of his right-wing radical nationalist party AfD. An employee from his environment received money from China before and after his trip.

There is a Chinese network of relationships: Krah confidante Torsten Voss sits on the board of the association "Neue Seidenstraße, e. V." ("New Silk Road, e. V."). On 23 April 2024, German police arrested Krah's parliamentary aide Jian Guo, a German of Chinese origin, on suspicion of spying for China. Jian Guo was convicted of espionage in October 2025.

==== Russia ====
In 2020 the AfD fraction in Bundestag invited Viktor Medvedchuk, who already had an entry ban to the US. He campaigned for the legitimacy of the Russian attack on Crimea and was welcomed by Petr Bystron and Krah. In 2021, Bystron and Krah visited Medvedchuk in Ukraine.

Krah was involved in the Russian influence network called "Voice of Europe". Although the FBI questioned Krah on 10 December 2023 about his relationship with Oleh Voloshyn, who serves as Viktor Medvedchuk's envoy in the West, he later denied receiving any money from anyone connected with Russia.

In December 2023, Krah traveled to the US and attended a Young Republicans event in New York City.

There, Voloshyn wrote to him in chat messages that the problem with "compensation" for "technical expenses" had been solved, and that from May onwards "it will be as it was before February". The FBI became aware of this while observing Voloshyn and interviewed Krah in New York City.

The wording used in the chats suggests that Krah may have been paid by Russia for a long time, which Krah denied. Only after German media reported on it did Krah admit being interrogated by the FBI in April 2024.

== Cooperation with other right-wing politicians ==
Krah is very active on TikTok and tries to reach 16-year-old first-time voters. Krah's social media strategy is carefully orchestrated with the help of another right-wing political activist.

== Financial influence cases ==
In February 2023, Krah was suspended from the "Identity and Democracy" (ID) parliamentary group, to which the AfD belongs in the EU Parliament, due to allegations of fraud. Krah's office had received strikingly similar bid documents from three companies for an advertising contract – the documents even had the same typos. The tender process was stopped. After an anonymous letter to the EU anti-corruption authority OLAF, that office got involved. The fraud investigation concluded without further action.

Krah is closely linked to the AfD candidate Arno Bausemer. During the election campaign, the media revealed that Bausemer had invented parts of his CV. In the summer, Krah tried to influence Bausemer's ex-girlfriend, the AfD politician Bianca Wolter. He wanted to ensure that Wolter did not comment negatively on Bausemer. He promised her financial benefits for her and her child if Bausemer was elected to the EU Parliament.

== Voice of Europe ==
According to the Czech counter-intelligence service (BIS), both Krah and his close associate Petr Bystron broadcast pro-Kremlin narratives through the Prague-based "Voice of Europe" platform to support politicians that are aligned with Moscow's interests and receive financial support as well. "Voice of Europe" allegedly is closely associated with Viktor Medvedchuk, who, as a show of solidarity, met with both Krah and Bystron in Kyiv during autumn 2021, only a few months before Russia invaded Ukraine. Both Medvedchuk and his close ally Oleh Voloshyn strongly oppose Volodymyr Zelenskyy.

== Employing a Chinese spy ==
At the end of April 2024, the German Public Prosecutor General had Krah's parliamentary employee Jian Guo arrested by the German police and his home in Dresden and his apartment in Brussels has been searched. Guo is said to work for the Chinese secret service MSS; the German public prosecutor's office said about Guo: "the accused repeatedly passed on information about negotiations and decisions in the European Parliament to his intelligence service client." He is also said to have been in Chinese dissident circles and to have spied on the Chinese democratic opposition in Germany. Krah brought Guo into his team in Brussels as an assistant in 2019 after he was elected to the European Parliament. In November 2019, Krah undertook a trip to China together with Jian G. The costs of accommodation in luxury hotels were covered by Chinese municipal administrations. After returning, Krah sent a letter to the AfD parliamentary group in which he complained about their tough stance toward the Chinese technology company Huawei. Krah's China trip to Huawei Research center.

The EU Parliament has suspended Guo from duty. "Following the decision of the German judicial authorities to arrest a person currently working as an accredited assistant (APA) in the European Parliament, and given the seriousness of the revelations, Parliament has suspended the person in question with immediate effect," the parliament said.

On 7 May 2024, authorities searched the European parliament office of Krah in Brussels on behalf of Germany's Public Prosecutor General. According to German media, the public prosecutor's office is investigating the suspicion that Krah, his law firm and his parliamentary office were financially supported by Guo over a long period of time with high five-figure sums – and whether this money may have come from the Chinese secret service.

=== Jian Guo ===
Guo is of Chinese descent, came to Germany from China in 2002 and initially studied at the Technical University Dresden. In the following years he worked as a businessman and gained German citizenship.

As ARD found out, Jian Guo had previously offered himself as a source to the German Federal Intelligence Service BND. However, the BND is said to have refused and referred Guo to the Saxon State Office for the Protection of the Constitution. Saxon officials from the office said that Guo had been an informant there from 2007 to 2018. He was "shut down" in 2018, at least a year before he started at Krah.

Guo had worked for Krah since his election to the European Union legislature in 2019.

He is a member of the AfD.

In 2024, a Chinese woman Yaqi X. passed German defense information to Jian Guo.

In April 2025, Guo was formally charged with espionage on behalf of the People's Republic of China. Jian Guo was convicted of espionage in October 2025.

=== Reactions ===
Federal Interior Minister Nancy Faeser (SPD) spoke of "extremely serious" allegations.

Marie-Agnes Strack-Zimmermann (FDP) said the fact that the employee of the AfD-EU top candidate presumably works for the Chinese secret service should not surprise his boss. In addition, number two on the AfD European list, Bundestag member Petr Bystron, is suspected of being paid by Russia. "Both should, based on human discretion, resign their candidacy instead of further damaging our country. ... These are really nice 'patriots' who are constantly selling Germany to China and Russia," said Strack-Zimmermann.

The NGO Lobbycontrol accused Maximilian Krah of failing to investigate allegations of espionage against his employee Jian Guo. "The suspicion of espionage against his employee has been known since 2023, and Krah did not draw any conclusions at the time," explained Aurel Eschmann from Lobbycontrol. In doing so, Krah "endangered not only the integrity of the EU, but also its security interests." Eschmann emphasized that Krah was "no longer tenable" as the AfD's top candidate for the European elections. "He should also resign his mandate in the EU Parliament immediately."

Krah himself said that he was surprised.
