= Chemnitzer Umland – Erzgebirgskreis II =

Federal electoral district of Germany

162 Chemnitzer Umland – Erzgebirgskreis II
- Electoral district for the Bundestag
- Chemnitzer Umland – Erzgebirgskreis II in 2025
- State: Saxony
- Population: 214,200 (2019)
- Electorate: 177,211 (2021)
- Major settlements: Limbach-Oberfrohna; Hohenstein-Ernstthal; Zwönitz
- Area: 902.9 km^{2}

Current electoral district
- Created: 2009
- Party: AfD
- Member: Maximilian Krah
- Elected: 2025

Chemnitzer Umland – Erzgebirgskreis II is an electoral constituency (German: Wahlkreis) represented in the Bundestag. It elects one member via first-past-the-post voting. Under the current constituency numbering system, it is designated as constituency 162. It is located in western Saxony, comprising parts of the Erzgebirgskreis, Mittelsachsen, and Zwickau districts.

Chemnitzer Umland – Erzgebirgskreis II was created for the 2009 federal election. From 2021 to 2025, it was represented by Mike Moncsek of the Alternative for Germany (AfD). Since 2025 it has been represented by Maximilian Krah of AfD.

== Geography ==
Chemnitzer Umland – Erzgebirgskreis II is located in western Saxony. As of the 2021 federal election, it comprises the municipalities of Hohndorf, Jahnsdorf, Neukirchen, Oelsnitz, Thalheim, and Zwönitz and the Verwaltungsgemeinschaften of Burkhardtsdorf, Lugau, and Stollberg from Erzgebirgskreis district; the municipalities of Claußnitz, Erlau, Geringswalde, Hartmannsdorf, Königshain-Wiederau, Lichtenau, Lunzenau, Penig, and Wechselburg and the Verwaltungsgemeinschaften of Burgstädt and Rochlitz from Mittelsachsen district; and the municipalities of Callenberg, Gersdorf, Hohenstein-Ernstthal, and Oberlungwitz and the Verwaltungsgemeinschaften of Limbach-Oberfrohna and Rund um den Auersberg from Zwickau district.

== History ==
Chemnitzer Umland – Erzgebirgskreis II was created in 2009 and contained parts of the abolished constituencies of Chemnitzer Land – Stollberg and Döbeln – Mittweida – Meißen II. In the 2009 election, it was constituency 164 in the numbering system. In the 2013 through 2021 elections, it was number 163. From the 2025 election, it has been number 162. Its borders have not changed since its creation.

== Members ==
The constituency was first represented by Marco Wanderwitz of the Christian Democratic Union (CDU) since its creation. It was won by Mike Moncsek of the Alternative for Germany (AfD) in 2021.

Election	Member	Party	%
2009	Marco Wanderwitz	CDU	41.2
2013	Marco Wanderwitz	CDU	49.6
2017	Marco Wanderwitz	CDU	35.1
2021	Mike Moncsek	AfD	28.9
2025	Maximilian Krah	AfD	44.2

== Election results ==
=== 2025 election ===
Federal election (2025): Chemnitzer Umland – Erzgebirgskreis II
Notes:	Blue background denotes the winner of the electorate vote. Pink background denotes a candidate elected from their party list. Yellow background denotes an electorate win by a list member, or other incumbent. A ✓ or ✗ denotes status of any incumbent, win or lose respectively.						
Party	Candidate	Votes	%	±%	Party votes	%	±%
AfD	Maximilian Krah	61,030	44.2	▲15.2	57,241	41.1	▲13.8
CDU	Katrin Pojar	38,302	27.7	▲4.1	29,537	21.2	▲3.1
BSW					14,548	10.5	New
SPD	Carlos Kasper	16,137	11.7	▼5.4	11,899	8.5	▼11.7
Left	Frederic Beck	14,229	10.3	▲2.0	10,864	7.8	▼0.4
FDP	Billy Bauer	4,654	3.4	▼5.4	4,416	3.2	▼7.9
Greens	Bernhard Herrmann	3,827	2.8	▼1.4	4,523	3.2	▼1.3
FW					2,814	2.0	▼1.3
Tierschutzpartei					1,605	1.2	▼0.7
PARTEI					581	0.4	▼0.8
Volt					450	0.3	▲0.2
BD					392	0.3	New
Pirates					179	0.1	▼0.1
Humanists					126	0.1	0.0
MLPD					32	<0.1	0.0
Informal votes		1,874			846		
Total valid votes		138,179			139,207		
Turnout		140,053	81.5	▲3.9			
AfD hold	Majority	27,704	16.5	▲11.3			

=== 2021 election ===
Federal election (2021): Chemnitzer Umland – Erzgebirgskreis II
Notes:	Blue background denotes the winner of the electorate vote. Pink background denotes a candidate elected from their party list. Yellow background denotes an electorate win by a list member, or other incumbent. A ✓ or ✗ denotes status of any incumbent, win or lose respectively.						
Party	Candidate	Votes	%	±%	Party votes	%	±%
AfD	Mike Moncsek	39,264	28.9	▲2.3	37,181	27.3	▲0.6
CDU	✗ Marco Wanderwitz	32,111	23.7	▼11.5	24,662	18.1	▼12.4
SPD	Carlos Kasper	23,181	17.1	▲6.7	27,518	20.2	▲9.6
FDP	Monique Woiton	11,872	8.7	▲1.2	15,117	11.1	▲3.4
Left	Sebastian Bernhardt	11,330	8.3	▼8.6	11,166	8.2	▼7.1
FW	Moritz Schüller	6,642	4.9		4,477	3.3	▲2.0
Greens	Bernhard Herrmann	5,617	4.1	▲0.8	6,138	4.5	▲1.7
Tierschutzpartei					2,527	1.9	▲0.5
PARTEI	André Hofmann	2,724	2.0		1,664	1.2	▲0.2
dieBasis	Jürgen Dreher	2,213	1.6		1,816	1.3	
Bündnis C					708	0.5	
Gesundheitsforschung					581	0.4	
NPD					542	0.4	▼0.8
ÖDP	Sebastian Högen	805	0.6		381	0.3	▲0.1
Pirates					362	0.3	▼0.1
The III. Path					266	0.2	
Team Todenhöfer					266	0.2	
Humanists					171	0.1	
Volt					160	0.1	
V-Partei3					139	0.1	0.0
DKP					88	0.1	
MLPD					52	0.0	0.0
Informal votes		1,664			1,441		
Total valid votes		135,759			135,982		
Turnout		137,423	77.5	▲1.9			
AfD gain from CDU	Majority	7,153	5.2				

=== 2017 election ===
Federal election (2017): Chemnitzer Umland – Erzgebirgskreis II
Notes:	Blue background denotes the winner of the electorate vote. Pink background denotes a candidate elected from their party list. Yellow background denotes an electorate win by a list member, or other incumbent. A ✓ or ✗ denotes status of any incumbent, win or lose respectively.						
Party	Candidate	Votes	%	±%	Party votes	%	±%
CDU	✓ Marco Wanderwitz	48,012	35.1	▼14.4	41,947	30.6	▼14.7
AfD	Ulrich Oehme	36,388	26.6		36,746	26.8	▲19.5
Left	Jörn Wunderlich	23,174	17.0	▼4.9	20,972	15.3	▼4.7
SPD	Ronny Kienert	14,142	10.3	▼5.3	14,524	10.6	▼3.9
FDP	Kristian Reinhold	10,345	7.6	▲5.3	10,542	7.7	▲5.0
Greens	André Oehler	4,609	3.4	▼0.3	3,850	2.8	▼0.4
FW					1,838	1.3	0.0
Tierschutzpartei					1,830	1.3	
NPD					1,686	1.2	▼2.0
PARTEI					1,471	1.1	
Pirates					513	0.4	▼1.5
BGE					349	0.3	
ÖDP					289	0.2	
DiB					265	0.2	
V-Partei³					172	0.1	
MLPD					103	0.1	0.0
BüSo					86	0.1	▼0.1
Informal votes		2,221			1,708		
Total valid votes		136,670			137,183		
Turnout		138,891	75.7	▲5.4			
CDU hold	Majority	11,624	8.5	▼19.2			

=== 2013 election ===
Federal election (2013): Chemnitzer Umland – Erzgebirgskreis II
Notes:	Blue background denotes the winner of the electorate vote. Pink background denotes a candidate elected from their party list. Yellow background denotes an electorate win by a list member, or other incumbent. A ✓ or ✗ denotes status of any incumbent, win or lose respectively.						
Party	Candidate	Votes	%	±%	Party votes	%	±%
CDU	✓ Marco Wanderwitz	65,157	49.6	▲8.3	59,939	45.3	▲7.7
Left	Jörn Wunderlich	28,783	21.9	▼3.4	26,434	20.0	▼5.5
SPD	Simone Violka	20,517	15.6	▲0.9	19,178	14.5	▼0.1
AfD					9,636	7.3	
NPD	Gitta Schüßler	6,205	4.7	▲0.7	4,307	3.3	▼0.5
Greens	Dan Fehlberg	4,874	3.7	▼0.4	4,282	3.2	▼1.3
FDP	Manfred Stefan Frünke	3,006	2.3	▼8.5	3,594	2.7	▼10.2
Pirates	Christian Peters	2,903	2.2		2,522	1.9	
FW					1,760	1.3	
PRO					504	0.4	
BüSo					158	0.1	▼0.5
MLPD					121	0.1	▼0.1
Informal votes		3,115			2,125		
Total valid votes		131,445			132,435		
Turnout		134,560	70.2	▲4.5			
CDU hold	Majority	36,374	27.7	▲11.8			

=== 2009 election ===
Federal election (2009): Chemnitzer Umland – Erzgebirgskreis II
Notes:	Blue background denotes the winner of the electorate vote. Pink background denotes a candidate elected from their party list. Yellow background denotes an electorate win by a list member, or other incumbent. A ✓ or ✗ denotes status of any incumbent, win or lose respectively.						
Party	Candidate	Votes	%	±%	Party votes	%	±%
CDU	Marco Wanderwitz	54,065	41.2	▲2.2	49,258	37.5	▲5.3
Left	Jörn Wunderlich	33,133	25.3	▲3.1	33,488	25.5	▲2.8
SPD	Simone Violka	19,247	14.7	▼9.3	19,114	14.6	▼9.1
FDP	Konrad Felber	14,092	10.7	▲4.7	16,968	12.9	▲3.1
Greens	Stefan Boxler	5,360	4.1	▲1.8	5,946	4.5	▲1.1
NPD	Frank Rohleder	5,229	4.0	▼1.2	4,975	3.8	▼1.1
BüSo					829	0.6	▲0.3
REP					463	0.4	▼0.6
MLPD					281	0.2	▲0.1
Informal votes		2,151			1,955		
Total valid votes		131,126			131,322		
Turnout		133,277	65.7	▼11.4			
CDU win new seat	Majority	30,932	15.9				
