= New Town Hall (Dresden) =

City hall in Dresden, Germany

The New Town Hall
- Das Neues Rathaus
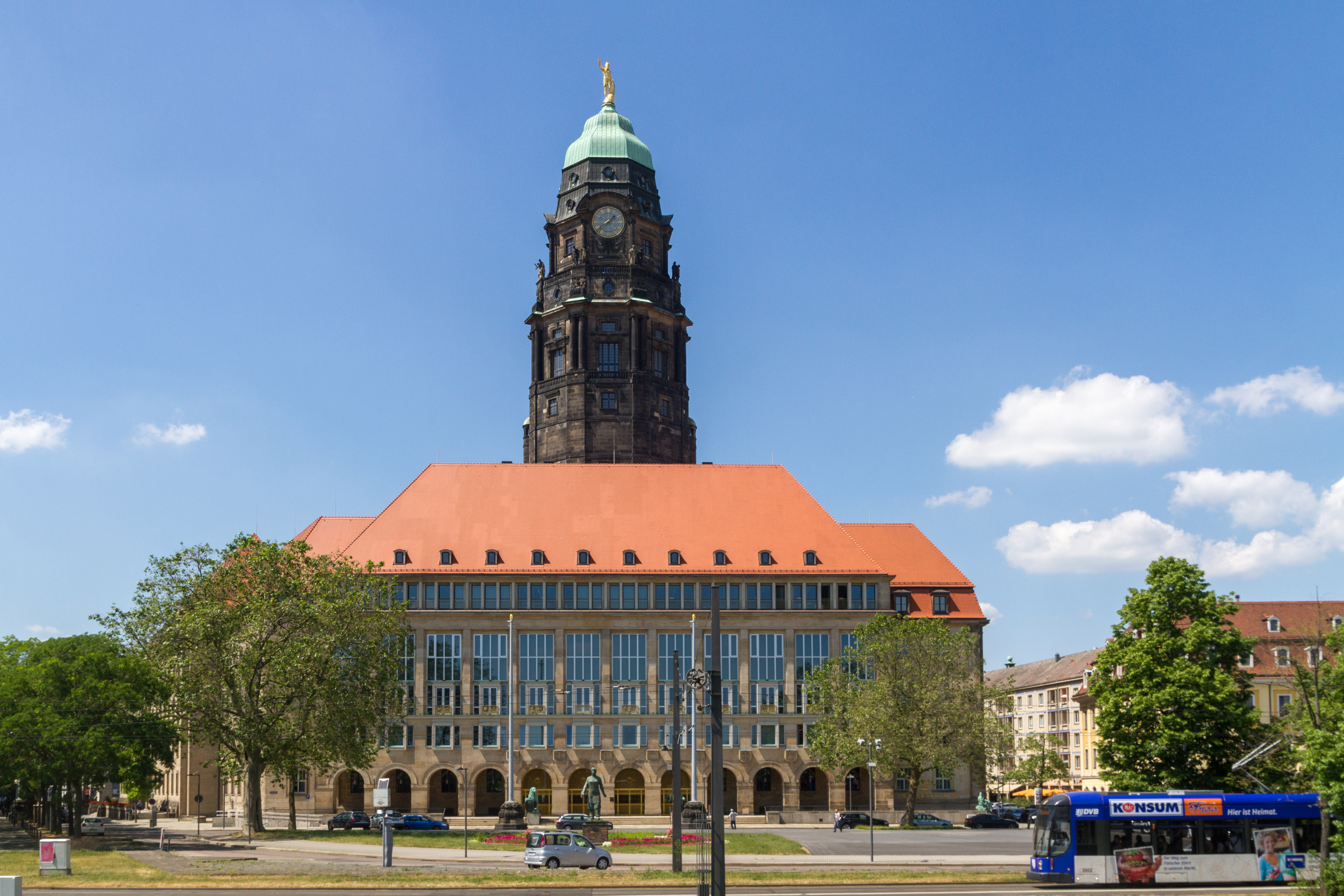
- The main frontage of the town hall in June 2017

General information
- Type: City hall
- Architectural style: Renaissance Revival style
- Location: Dresden, Germany
- Coordinates: 51.047908°N 13.74126°E
- Construction started: 1905
- Completed: 1910

Height
- Height: 100.30 m (329 ft 1 in)

Design and construction
- Architect: Karl Roth

The New Town Hall (German: Neues Rathaus) is a municipal building in Dresden, in eastern Germany, standing on Dr.-Külz-Ring. It accommodates the city council and offices of the Mayor of Dresden.

== History ==
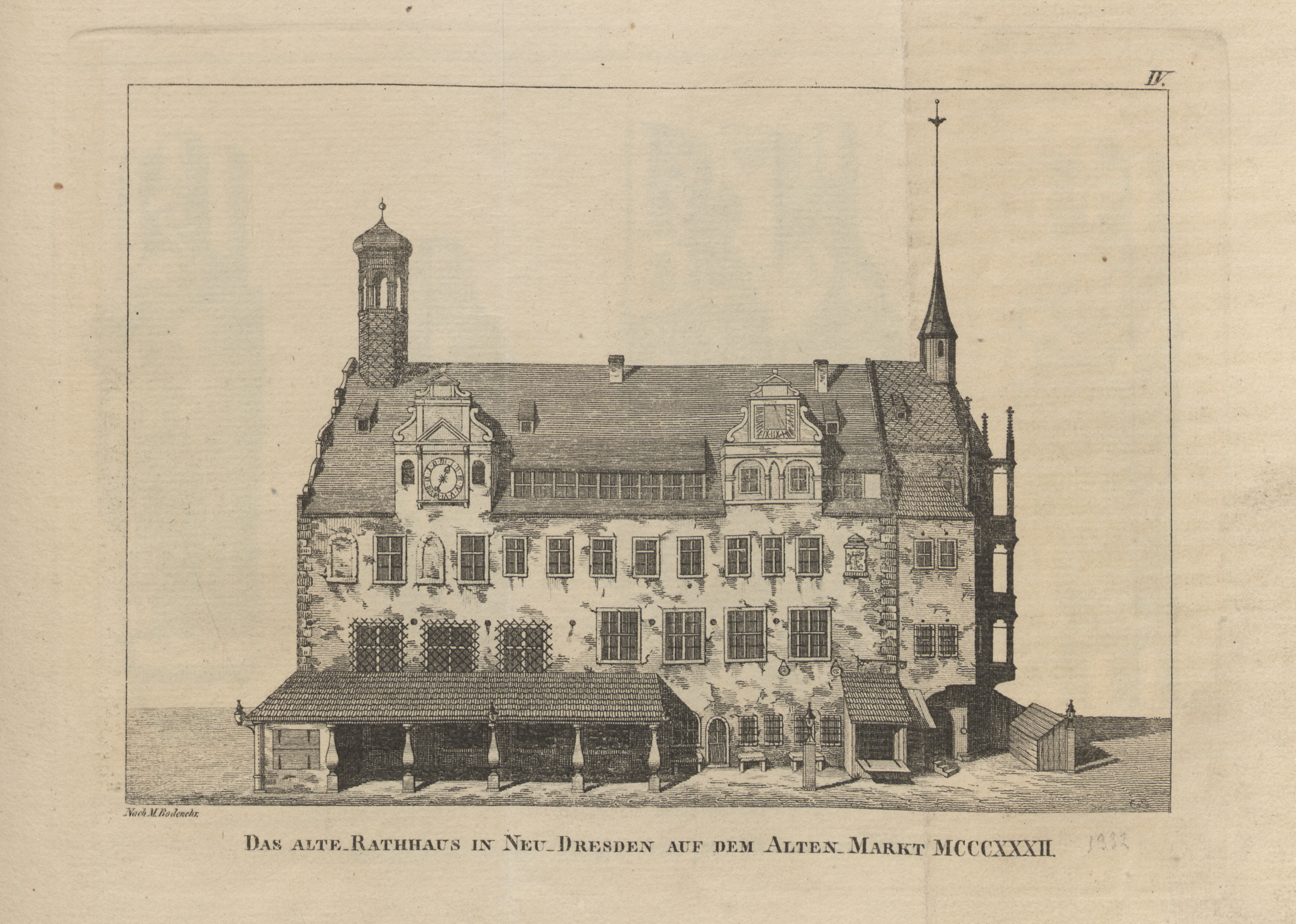
The first town hall

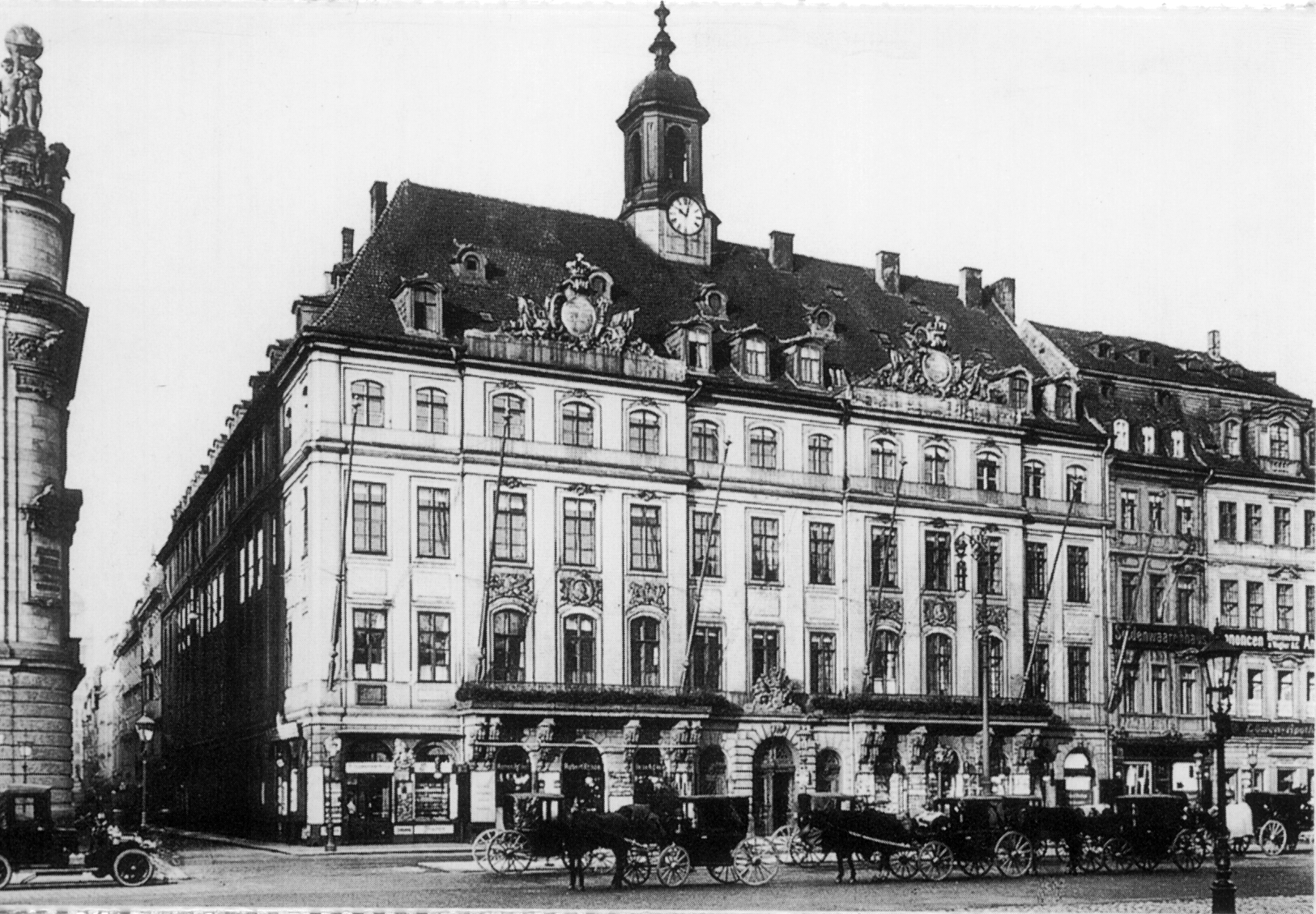
The second town hall (the old town hall)

The first town hall in Dresden was a building on the north side of the Altmarkt dating from the 13th century. After becoming dilapidated, it was demolished in 1707.

After briefly using temporary accommodation, the council relocated to a building on the west side of the Altmarkt in 1709. However, in 1740, the council decided to demolish this building and to commission a new town hall on the same site. The new building was designed by Johann Christoph Knöffel in the neoclassical style, built by Johann Gottfried Fehre in ashlar stone and was completed in 1745. The design involved a symmetrical main frontage of 13 bays facing into the Altmarkt. The 3rd, 4th and 5th bays from each end were slightly projected forward and surmounted, at roof level, by coats of arms. This building, which was known as the Altstädter Rathaus (old town hall), was vacated by the council in 1910 and then destroyed by the bombing of Dresden during the Second World War.

In the 1870s, following significant population growth, the council led by the mayor, Paul Alfred Stübel, decided to commission a new building. The site they selected was on the north side of what is now Dr.-Külz-Ring. However, it was not until 1888 that a corresponding council resolution was passed, and not until 1901 that an architectural competition for a new town hall was announced. The foundation stone for the new building was laid by King Frederick Augustus III of Saxony on 29 September 1905. It was designed by Karl Roth from Darmstadt in the Renaissance Revival style, built in ashlar stone and was officially opened on 1 October 1910.

The design involved a symmetrical main frontage of twelve bays facing onto the new Rathausplatz. It was arcaded on the ground floor, and fenestrated with small square windows on the first floor and tri-partite windows on the second floor. The block was surmounted by a hipped roof with a series of dormer windows. Behind the main block, there was a multi-stage tower which was 100.3 metres (329 ft) high and surmounted by a gilded figure of a man. The tower was adorned with 16 virtues, namely (counter-clockwise starting in the north): love, hope, mercy, piety, faith, loyalty, courage, perseverance, strength, sacrifice, wisdom, kindness, justice, truth, vigilance and prudence.

The building was severely damaged during the bombing raids in February 1945, and extensive reconstruction work was carried out in a simplified form from 1948 under the direction of Emil Leibold. The reconstruction of the paintings in the ballrooms was abandoned. The main frontage was completed in 1952, followed between 1962 and 1965 by the reconstruction of the ballroom wing by Herbert Terpitz, Manfred Arlt and Kollektiv (with interior design by Theo Wagenführ). The Hellerau workshops were responsible for the interior design of the new plenary hall. Between 2011 and 2016, this wing was extensively renovated and the staircase was largely restored to its original state.

The sculpture Trümmerfrau ('rubble woman'), created by Walter Reinhold in 1952, stands on the town hall square to the east of the town hall to commemorate the many women who removed the mountains of brick rubble in the city after 1945. The original iron casting was recast in bronze in 1967.

Since July 2024, a room in the New Town Hall has been named after the theatre actress and women's rights activist Marie Stritt. The hall is used for weddings and entries in the city's Golden Book, among other things.

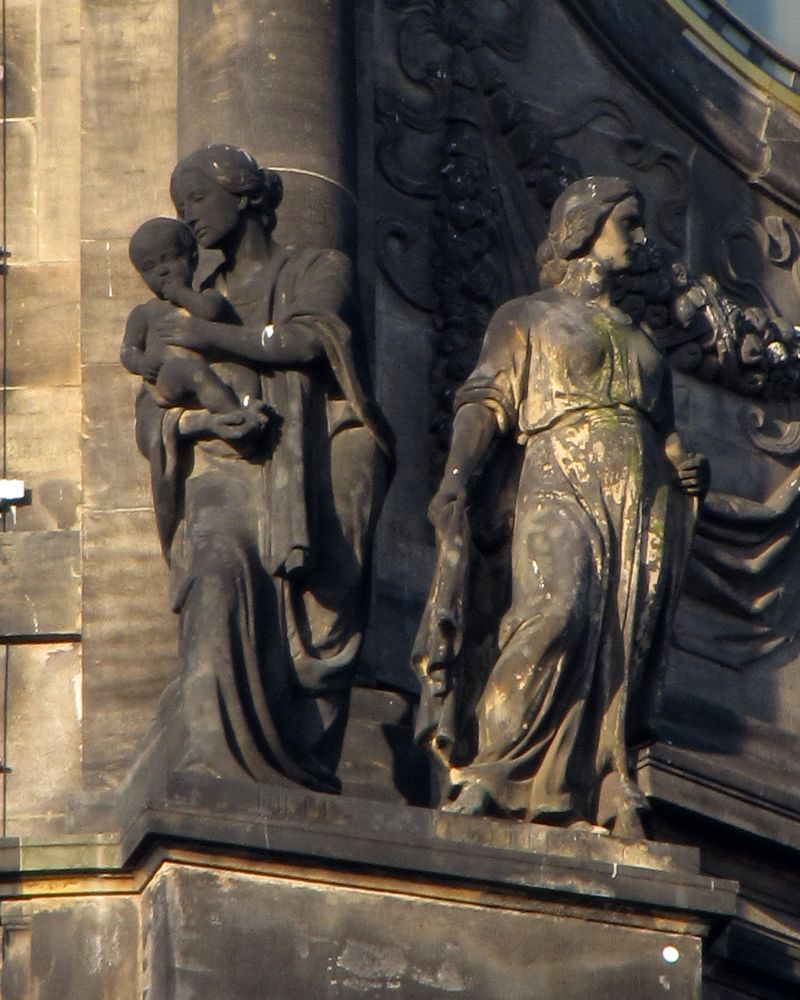
Love and hope

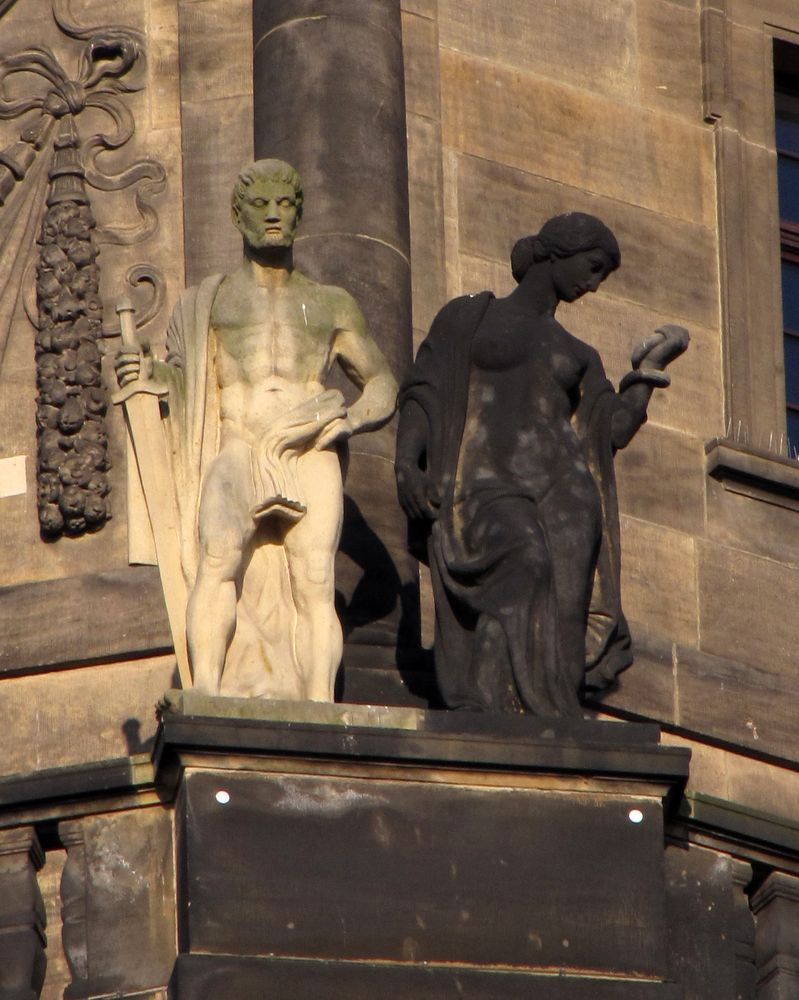
Vigilance and Prudence

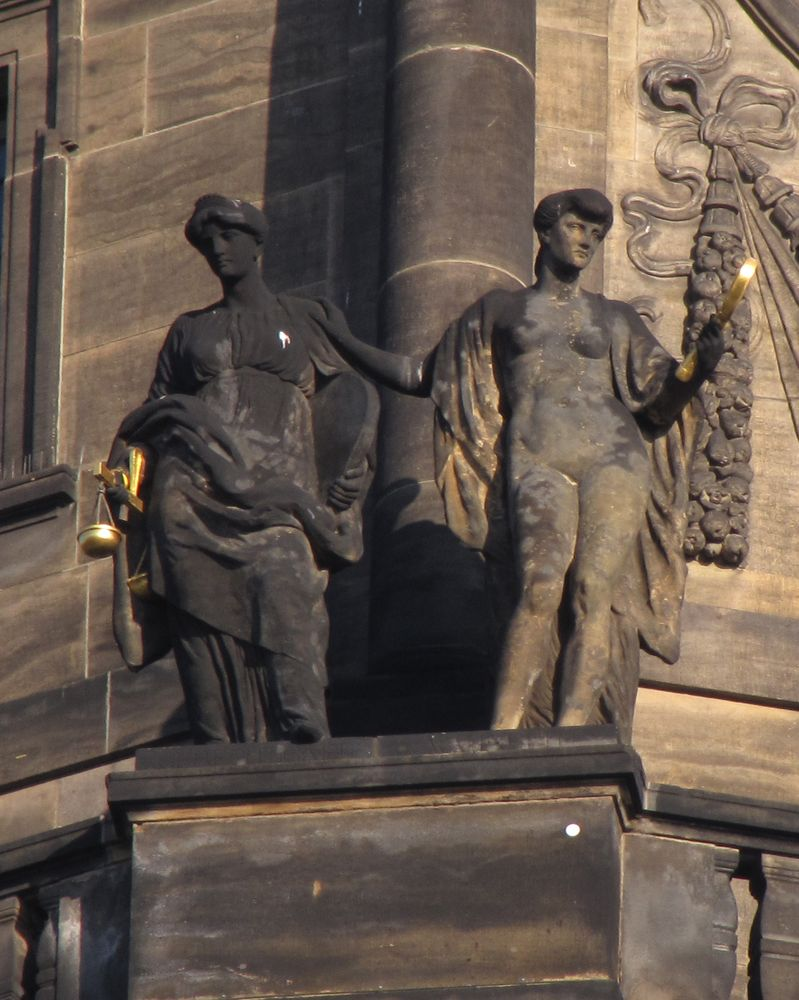
Justice and truth

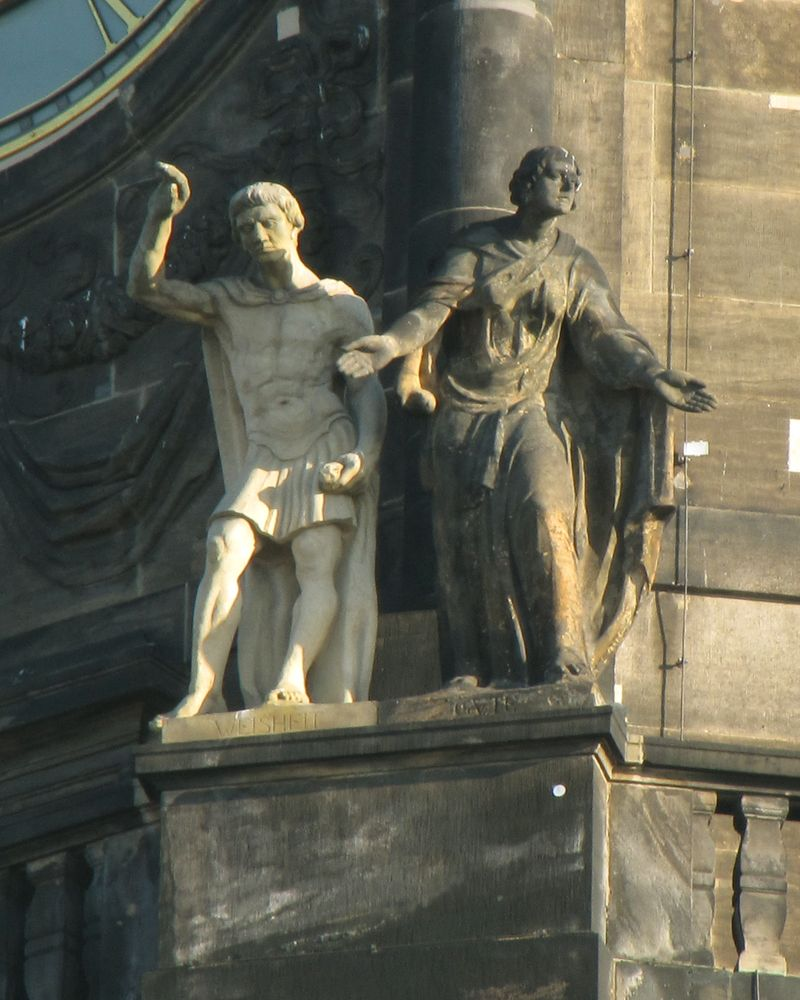
Wisdom and goodness

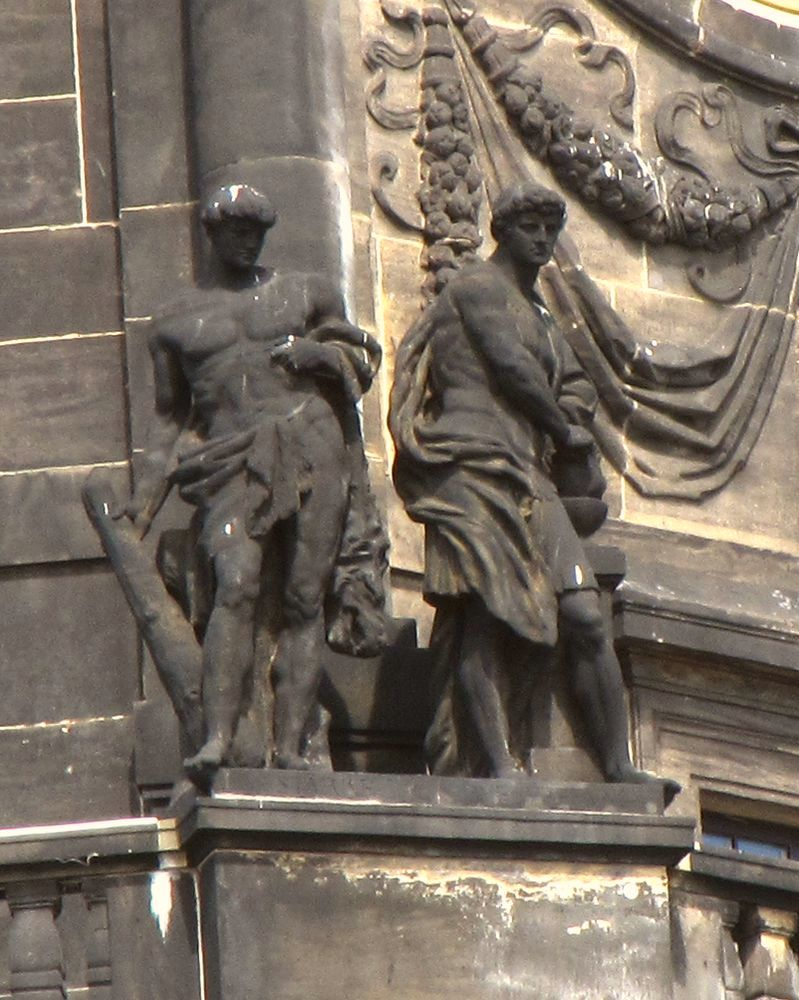
Strength and sacrifice

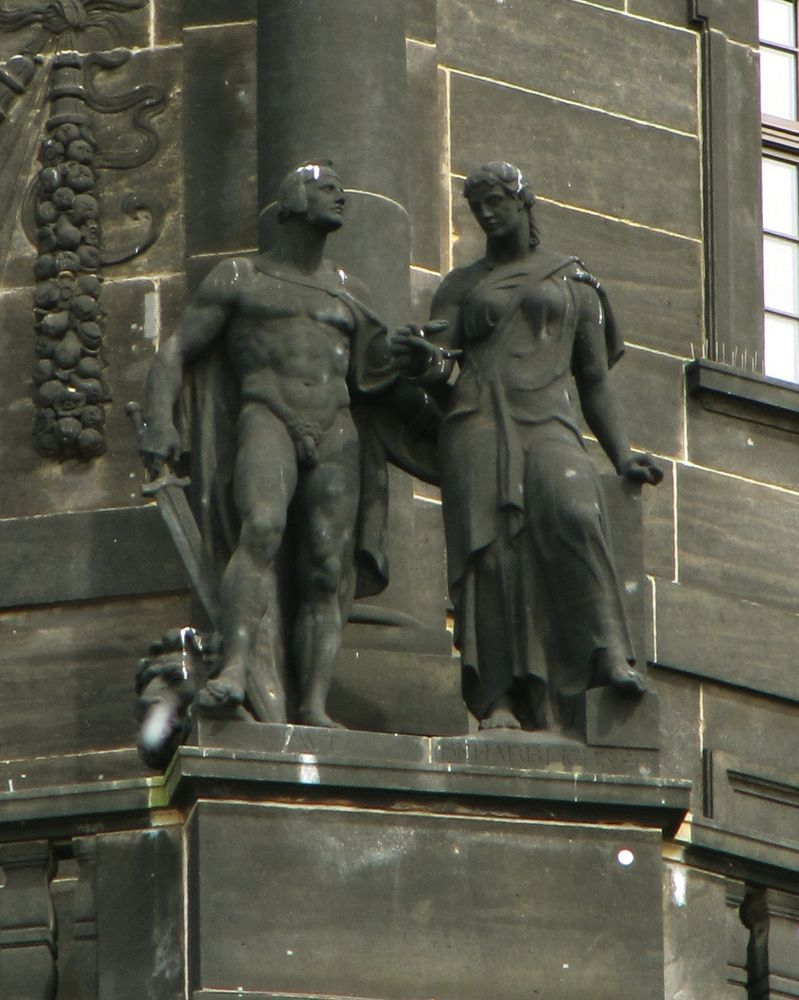
Courage and perseverance

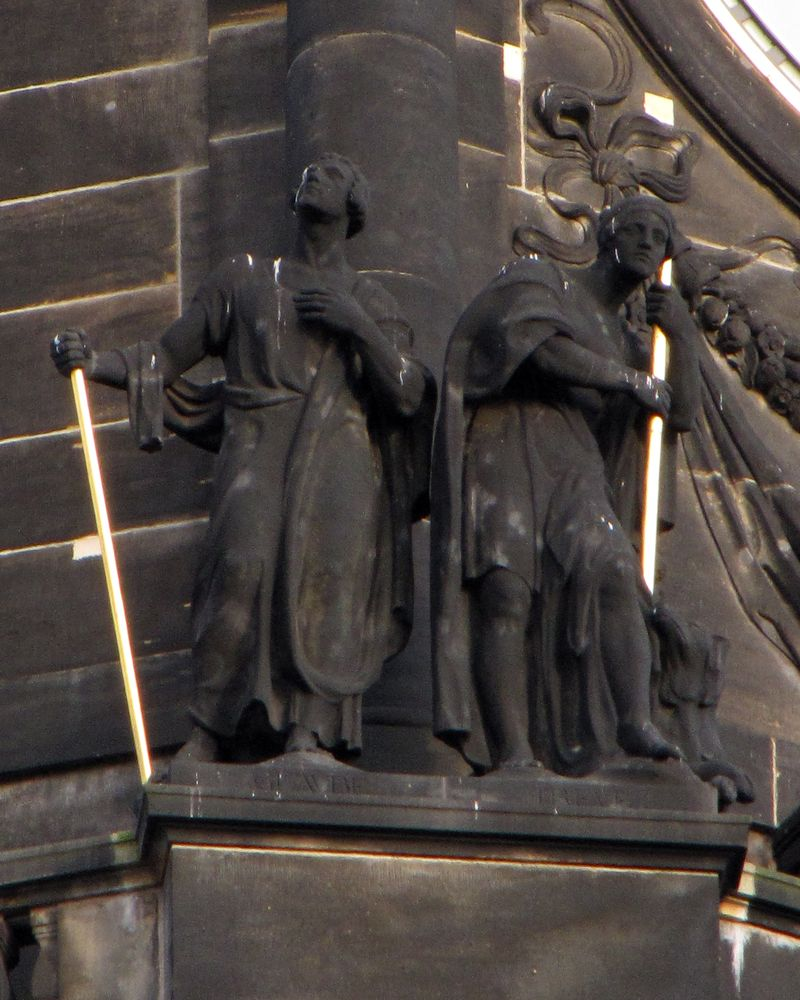
Faith and loyalty

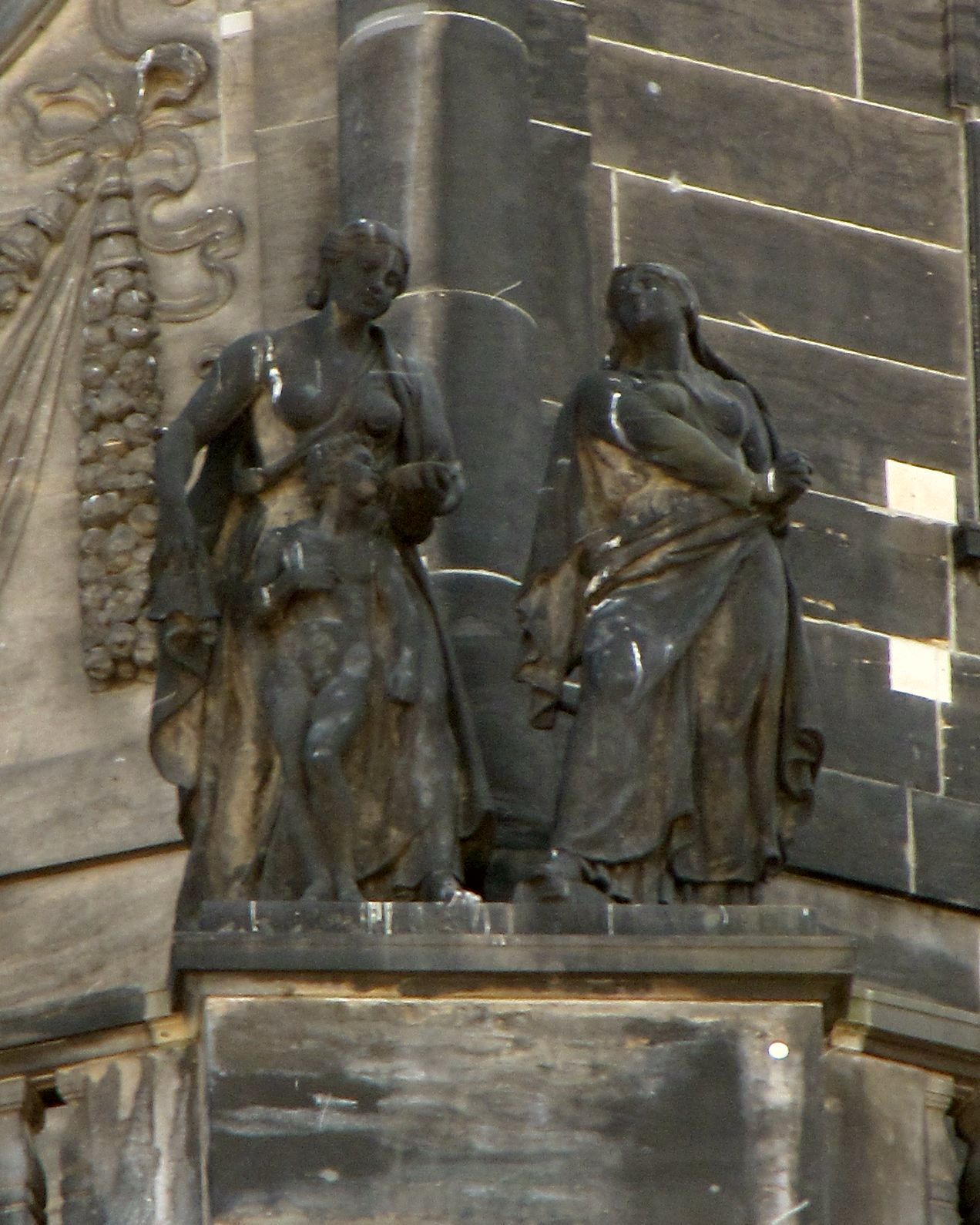
Mercy and piety
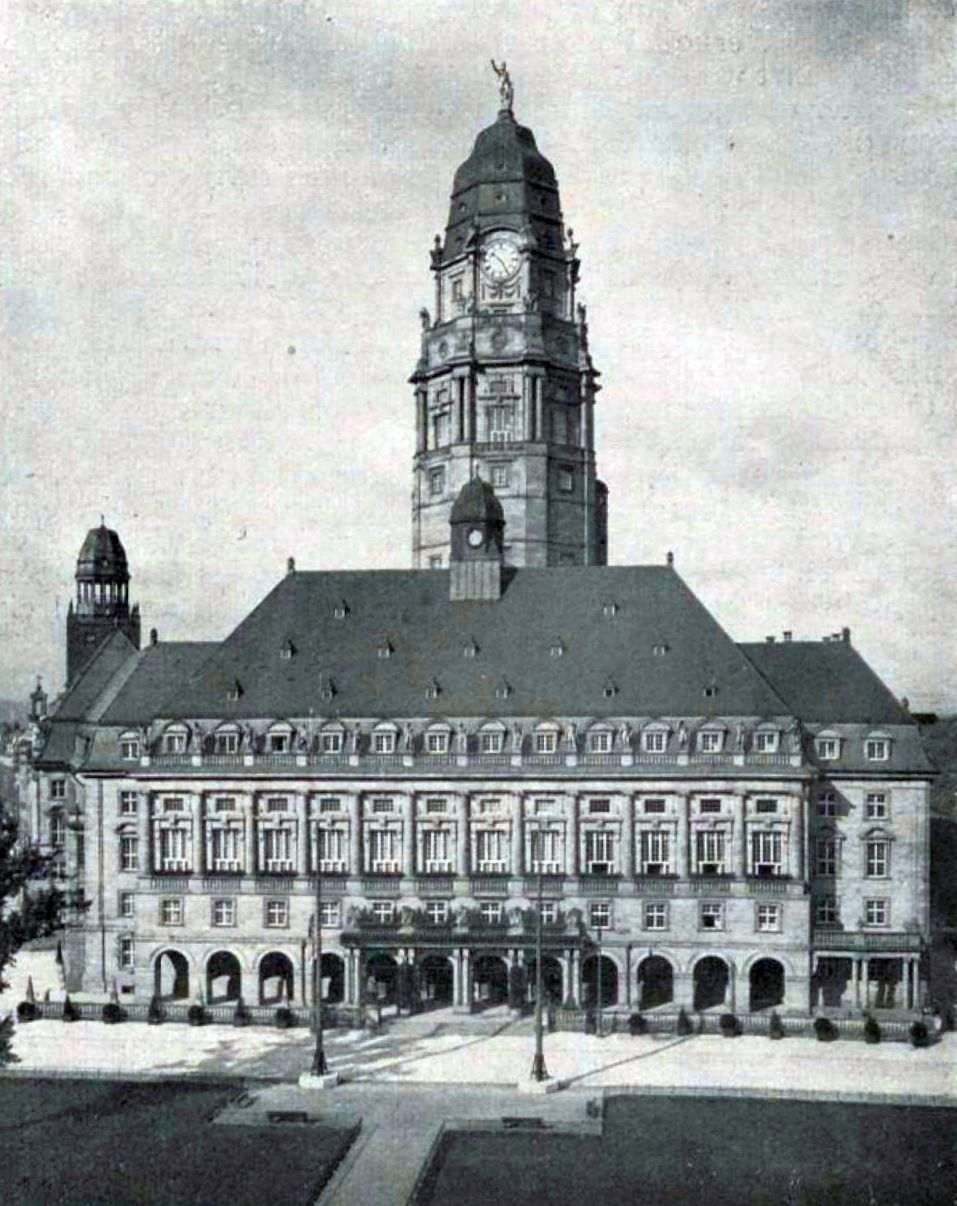
Front view in 1914

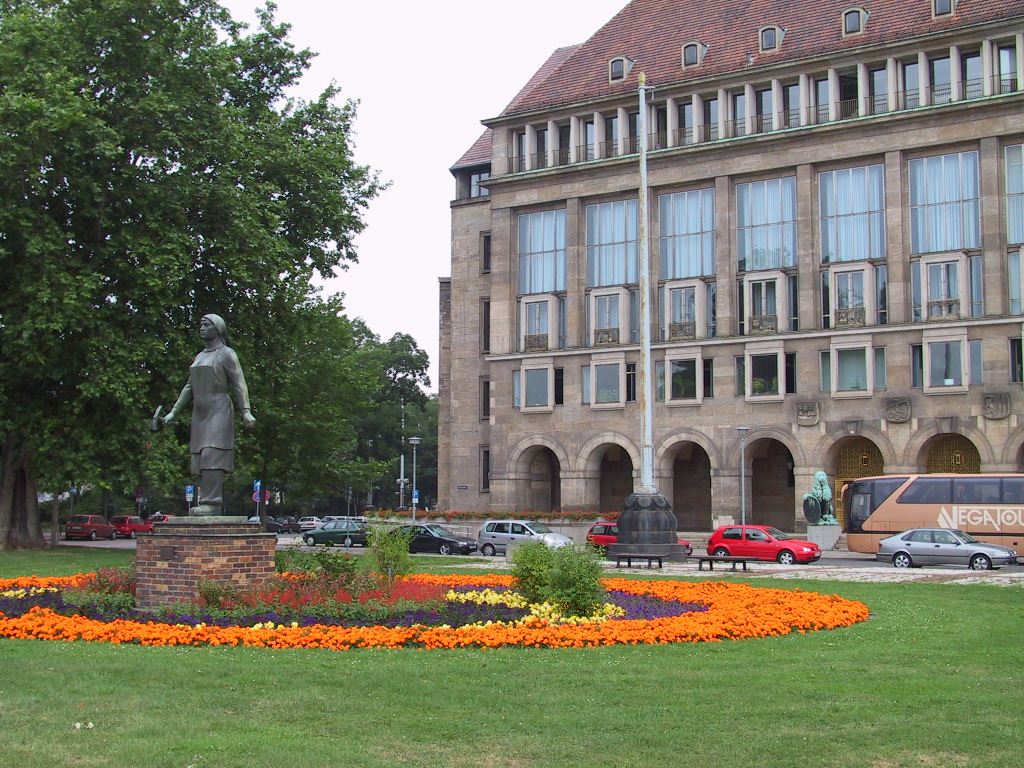
Trümmerfrauen memorial in front of the town hall

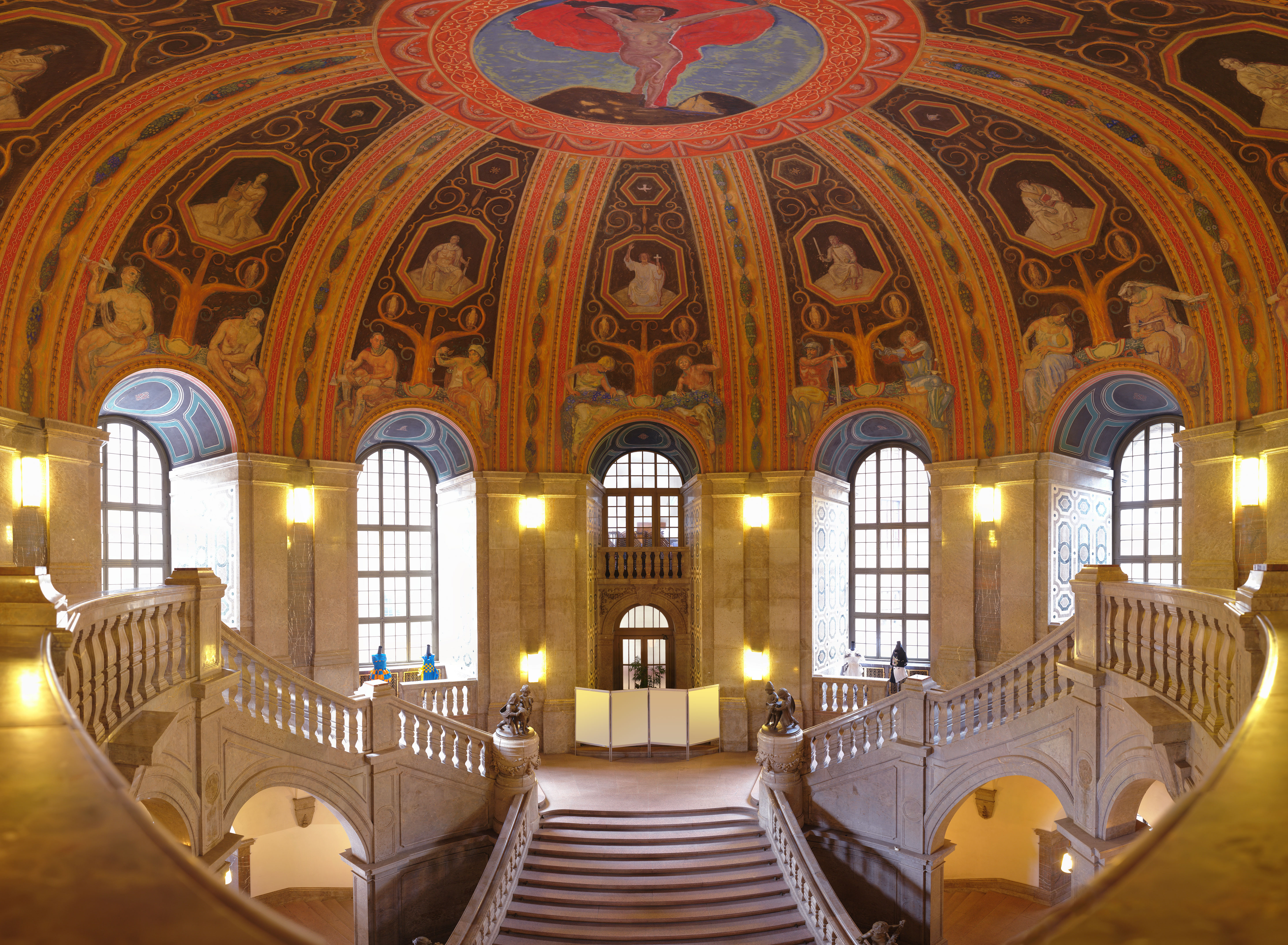
Staircase design by Otto Gussmann (1910–1914)

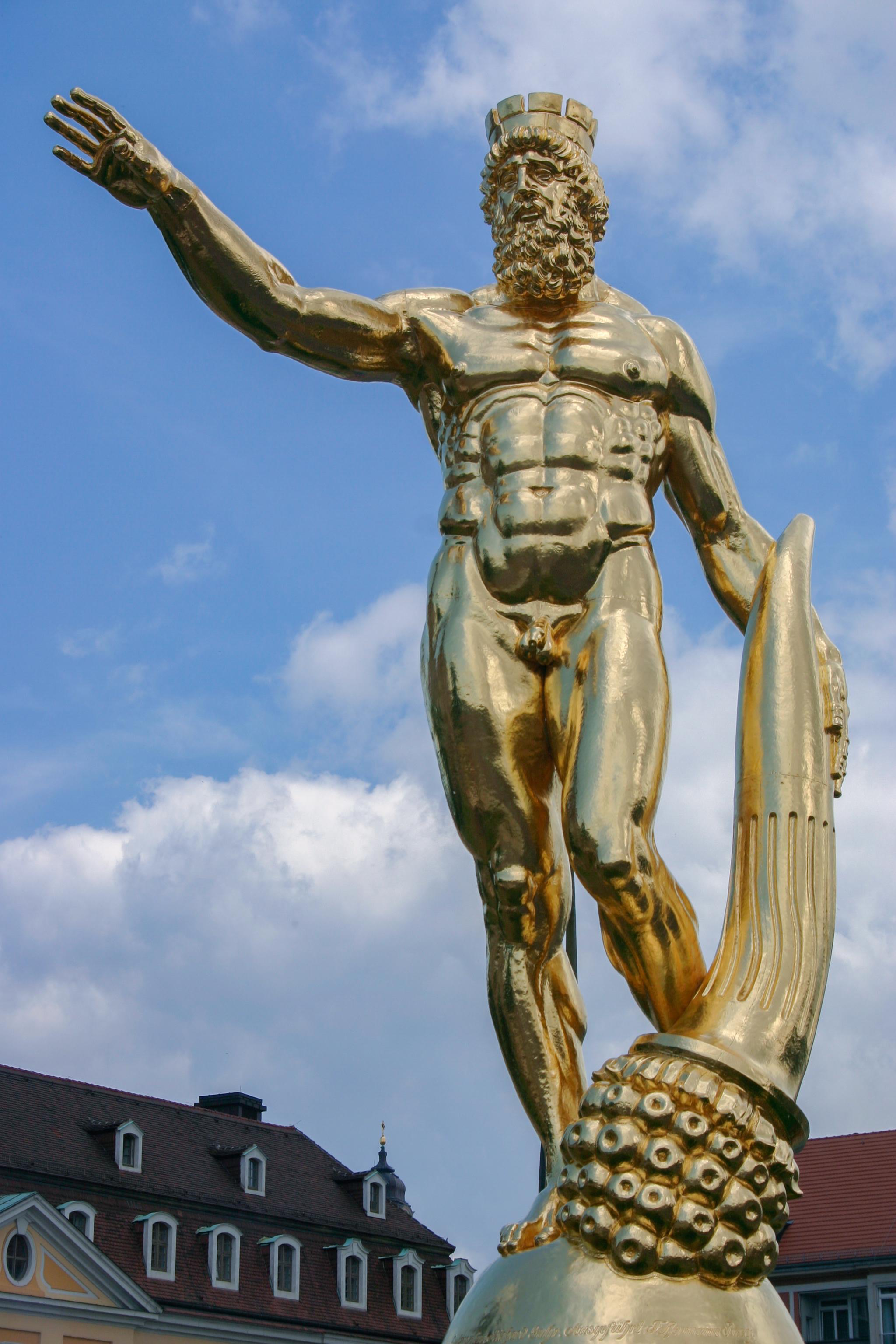
Golden Town Hall Man

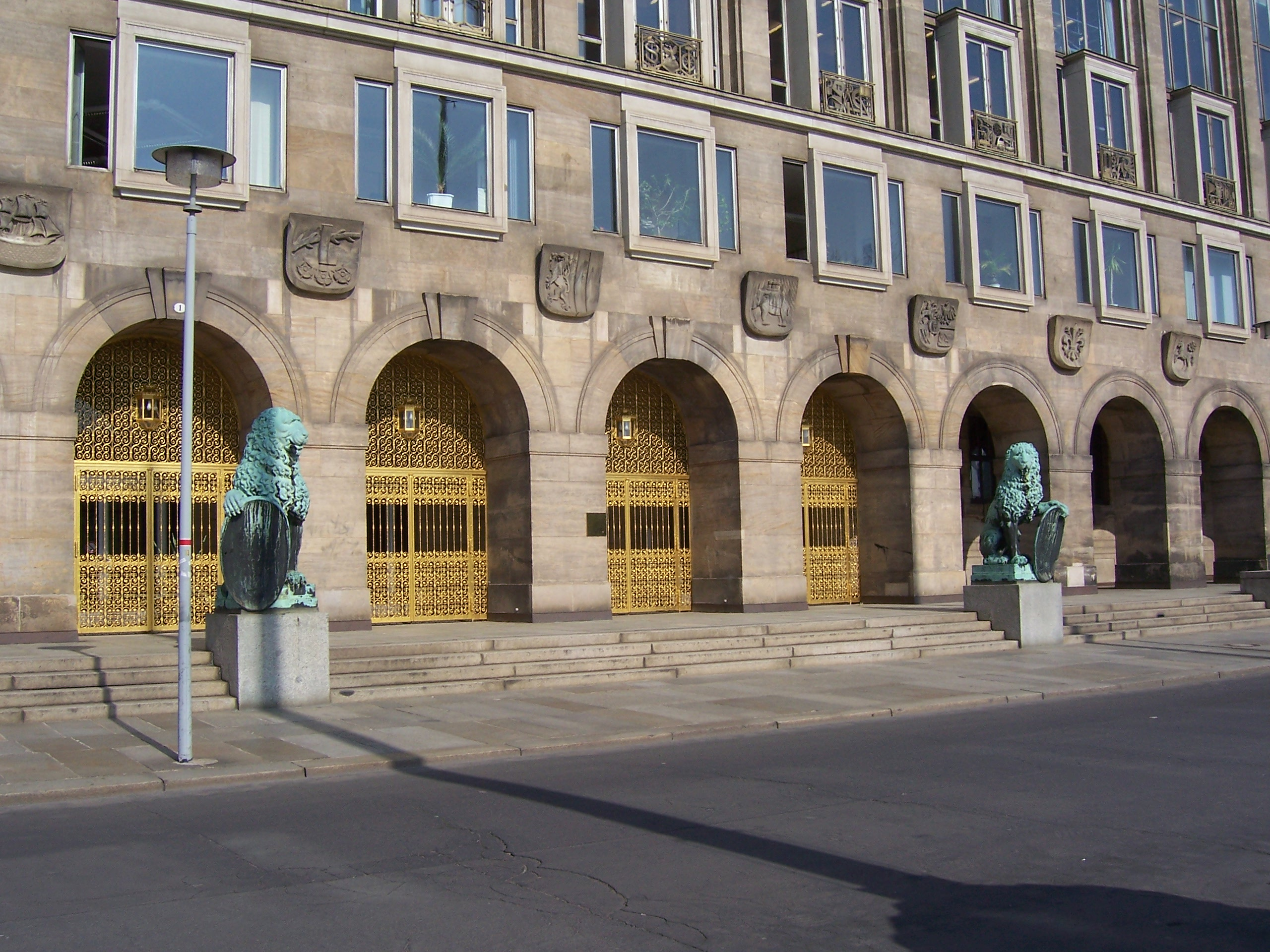
Golden gate with the two lions by Georg Wrba
