= Carlos Kasper =

German politician

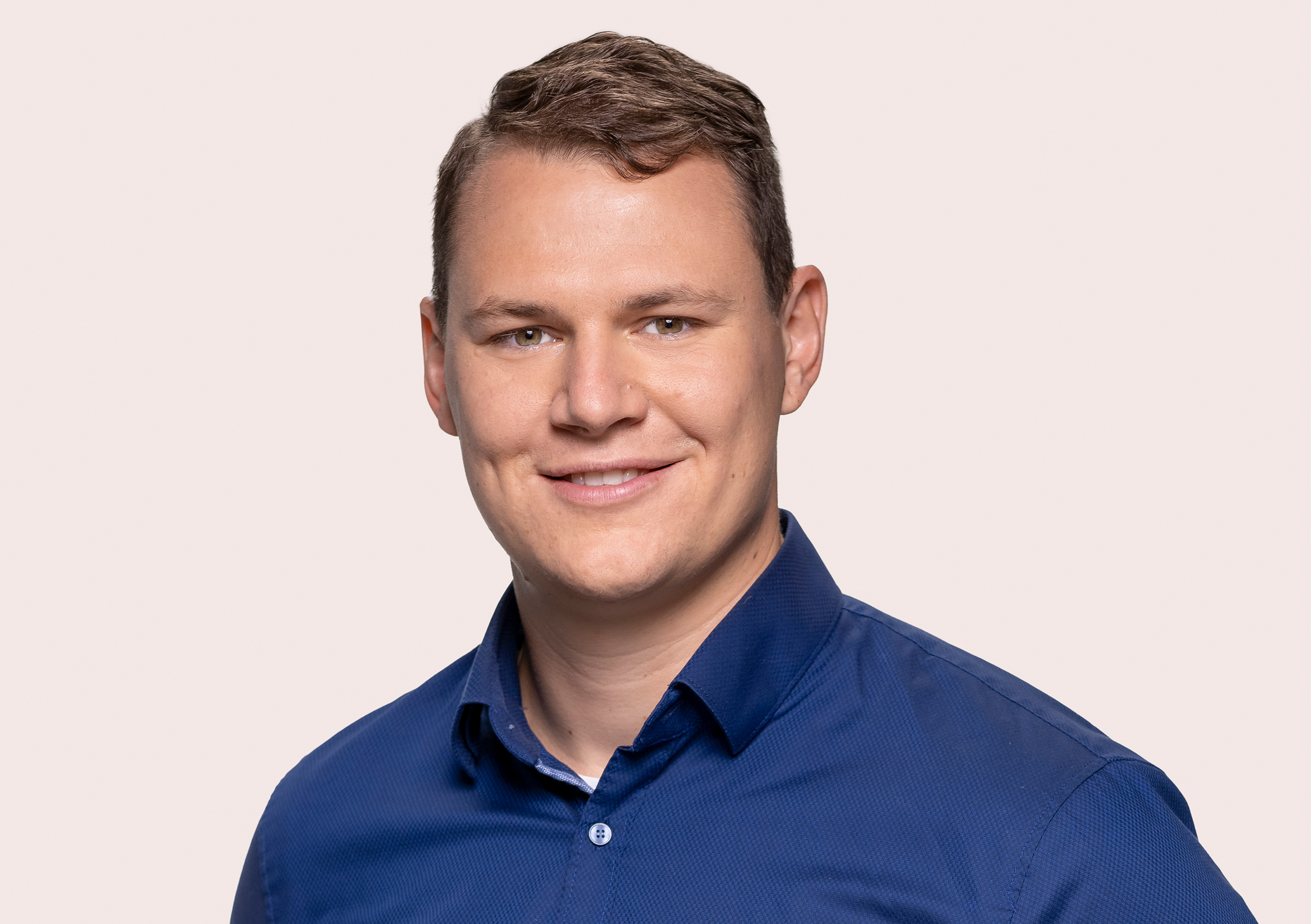
- Carlos Kasper in 2021

Member of the Bundestag
- In office 2021–2025

Personal details
- Born: 3 September 1994 (age 31) Lichtenstein, Saxony, Germany
- Party: SPD

Carlos Kasper (born 3 September 1994) is a German customs officer and politician of the Social Democratic Party (SPD) who has been serving as a member of the Bundestag from 2021 to 2025.

== Early career ==
Since 2019, Kasper has been working as customs officer at the Federal Customs Service in Dresden.

== Political career ==
Kasper joined the SPD in 2014.

Kasper was elected to the Bundestag in 2021, representing the Chemnitzer Umland – Erzgebirgskreis II district. In parliament, he has since been serving on the Finance Committee.

In addition to his committee assignments, Kasper co-chaired the German-Iranian Parliamentary Friendship Group from 2021 until its dissolution in 2023.

Within his parliamentary group, Kasper is part of a working group on criminal policy, chaired by Sebastian Fiedler. He also belongs to the Parliamentary Left, a left-wing movement.

== Other activities ==
- Trade Union of the Police (GdP), Member
- Nature and Biodiversity Conservation Union (NABU), Member
