= Marco Wanderwitz =

German politician (born 1975)

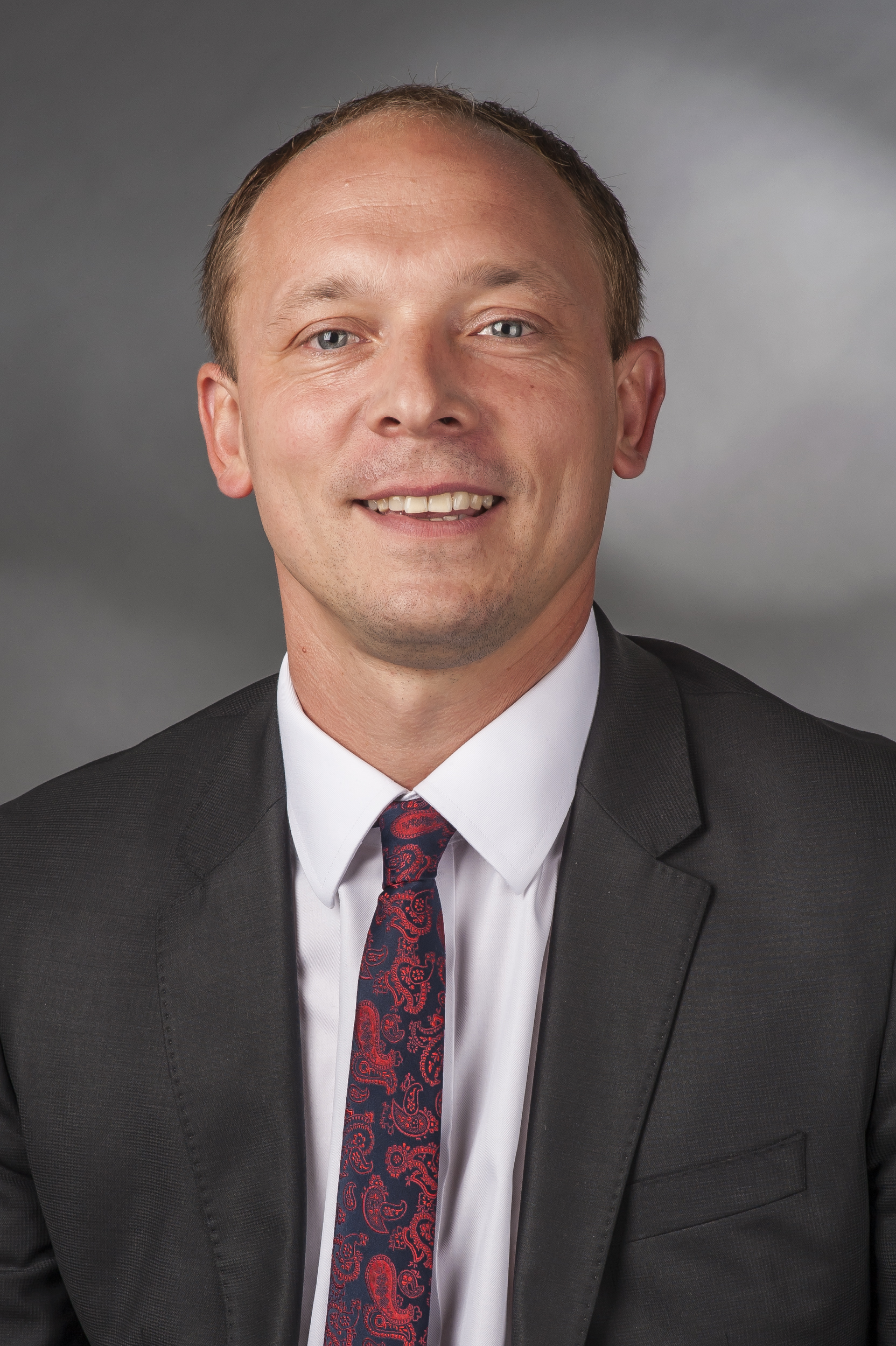

Parliamentary State Secretary for the New States
- In office 8 February 2020 – 8 December 2021
- Minister: Peter Altmaier
- Preceded by: Christian Hirte
- Succeeded by: Carsten Schneider (as Minister of State for East Germany and Equivalent Living Conditions)

Parliamentary State Secretary for Building, Housing and Urban Development
- In office 14 March 2018 – 8 February 2020
- Minister: Horst Seehofer
- Preceded by: Günter Krings
- Succeeded by: Volkmar Vogel

Member of the Bundestag for Saxony
- In office 17 October 2002 – 2025
- Preceded by: Constituency established
- Constituency: Chemnitzer Umland – Erzgebirgskreis II (Chemnitzer Land – Stollberg; 2002–2009)

Personal details
- Born: 10 October 1975 (age 51) Karl-Marx-Stadt, East Germany (now Chemnitz, Germany)
- Party: CDU
- Education: TU Dresden; University of Potsdam
- Occupation: Lawyer

Marco Wanderwitz (born 10 October 1975) is a German lawyer and politician of the Christian Democratic Union (CDU). From 2018 until 2021, he served as Parliamentary State Secretary in the government of Chancellor Angela Merkel.

== Education and early career ==
After graduating from in 1994 Wanderwitz did his military service. As of 1995, he studied of law at the Technical University of Dresden passed his first Staatsexamen in this discipline at the University of Potsdam in 2000. Subsequent to his internship in 2002, he passed the second state examination and has been a registered lawyer in Leipzig as of 2003.

== Political career ==
Wanderwitz joined the Junge Union in 1990 and the CDU party in 1998. He is a Chairman of the CDU district department in Zwickau and he belongs to the board of the protestant working group in Chemnitz and Chemnitz district. He is a member of the local political association of Chemnitz-Mittweida-Zwickau.

Since 2004 Wanderwitz has been a part of the City Council of the major district town Hohenstein-Ernstthal.

=== Member of Parliament, 2002–2025 ===
From the 2002 elections, Wanderwitz was a member of the German Bundestag, representing the Chemnitzer Umland – Erzgebirgskreis II district. Following his term as vice chairman of the Young Group within the CDU/CSU parliamentary group from 2002 until 2005, he later served as the group's chairman from 2005 until 2014.

Wanderwitz always entered the German Bundestag as directly elected deputy. In the 2005 elections he reached 37.5 percent of primary votes. He was also a candidate from CDU party for the federal electoral district of Chemnitz Umland/Erzgebirge District II in 2009, when he reached 41.2% of the primary vote in the general election of the 2009.

In 2006, Wanderwitz joined Friedrich Merz and eight other parliamentarians who filed a complaint at the Federal Constitutional Court against the disclosure of additional sources of income; the complaint was ultimately unsuccessful.

In the negotiations to form a coalition government of the Christian Democrats (CDU together with the Bavarian CSU) and the FDP following the 2009 federal elections, Wanderwitz was part of the CDU/CSU delegation in the working group on social affairs and labor policy, led by Ronald Pofalla and Dirk Niebel.

In the negotiations to form a Grand Coalition of the Christian Democrats and the SPD following the 2013 federal elections, Wanderwitz was part of the CDU/CSU delegation in the working group on cultural and media affairs, led by Michael Kretschmer and Klaus Wowereit. From January 2014 he served as chairman of the CDU/CSU working group for culture and media and thereby a speaker of cultural and media policy of this group. He was also a full member of the Committee on Legal Affairs and Consumer Protection.

Ahead of the 2021 elections, Wanderwitz was elected to lead the CDU's campaign in Saxony.

After leaving government following the 2021 elections, Wanderwitz joined the Committee on Cultural Affairs and Media again.

In November 2024, Wanderwitz announced that he would not stand in the 2025 federal elections but instead resign from active politics by the end of the parliamentary term. He said he no longer wanted to run for the Bundestag given the increasing “hatred and agitation”.

=== Career in government, 2018–2021 ===
In the fourth government under Chancellor Angela Merkel, Wanderwitz served as Parliamentary State Secretary in the Federal Ministry of the Interior under the leadership of Minister Horst Seehofer from 2018 until 2020. Following the dismissal of Christian Hirte in 2020, he moved to the Federal Ministry for Economic Affairs and Energy under the leadership of minister Peter Altmaier.

== Other activities ==
=== Corporate boards ===
- Sachsenring, Member of the Supervisory Board
- Volksbank Mittweida, Member of the Supervisory Board

=== Non-profit organizations ===
- Germany Trade and Invest, Ex-Officio Member of the Supervisory Board (since 2020)
- Foundation for the Humboldt Forum in the Berlin Palace, Ex-Officio Member of the Council (since 2018)
- Deutsche Welle, Member of the Broadcasting Committee
- Federal Cultural Foundation, Member of the Board of Trustees
- German Federal Film Board (FFA), Member of the Supervisory Board
- German-Portuguese Society, Member of the Advisory Board

== Political positions ==
In context of the European debt crisis, Wanderwitz emphasized in the interview “Give away your islands” that Greece could privatize islands if the country cannot meet its obligations. In the summer of 2010 he suggested that citizens with unhealthy nutrition should be involved more in the financing of health insurance because this way they would consciously be aware of the cost of funds. In February 2012 he called for higher social security contributions from childless citizens to allow relief for families with children.

In June 2017, Wanderwitz voted against Germany’s introduction of same-sex marriage.

Ahead of the Christian Democrats’ leadership election in 2018, Wanderwitz publicly endorsed Annegret Kramp-Karrenbauer to succeed Angela Merkel as the party’s chair. In 2019, Wanderwitz joined 14 members of his parliamentary group who, in an open letter, called for the party to rally around Merkel and Kramp-Karrenbauer amid criticism voiced by conservatives Friedrich Merz and Roland Koch.

In 2020, Wanderwitz expressed support for Markus Söder as the Christian Democrats' candidate to succeed Chancellor Angela Merkel in the 2021 national elections.

Together with Carmen Wegge, Till Steffen and Martina Renner, Wanderwitz was one of the initiators of a 2024 cross-party initiative to request that the Federal Constitutional Court issue a ban of the far-right Alternative for Germany party.

In January 2025, Wanderwitz was one of 12 CDU lawmakers who opted not to back a draft law on tightening immigration policy sponsored by their own leader Friedrich Merz, who had pushed for the law despite warnings from party colleagues that he risked being tarnished with the charge of voting alongside the Alternative for Germany.

== Controversy ==
On New Year's Eve in 2021, Wanderwitz’s offices in Zwönitz were vandalized.

== Personal life ==
Wanderwitz is married and has three children. Since 2018, he has been in a relationship with Yvonne Magwas.
