= Petr Bystron =

Czech-born German politician (born 1972)

Petr Bystron MEP
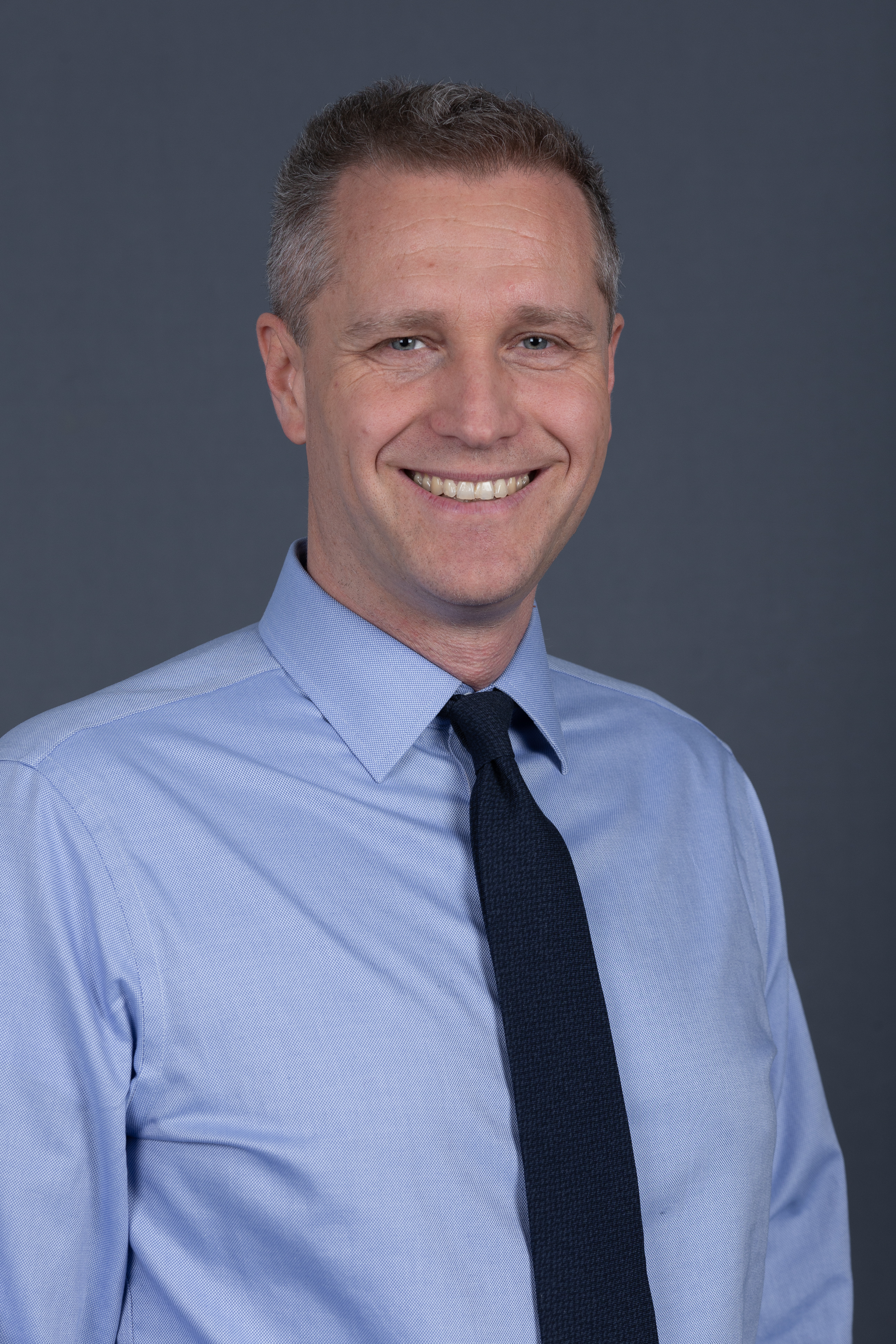
- Bystron in 2020

Member of the European Parliament for Germany
- Incumbent
- Assumed office 16 July 2024

Member of the Bundestag for Bavaria
- In office 24 September 2017 – July 2024
- Succeeded by: Manfred Schiller

Personal details
- Born: Petr Bystroň; 30 November 1972 (age 53) Olomouc, Czechoslovakia (now the Czech Republic)
- Party: Alternative for Germany
- Other political affiliations: Free Democratic Party (2006–2013)
- Education: School of Political Science, Munich
- Website: petrbystron.de

Petr Bystron (born 30 November 1972) is a Czech-born German politician. He has been a member of the Bundestag since the 2017 German federal election for the far-right party Alternative for Germany (AfD).

== Biography ==
Bystron was born in Olomouc, Czechoslovakia and grew up in both Český Těšín and Thuringia. Bystron moved to Germany with his parents in 1988 from the former Czechoslovakia where he was granted asylum.

He studied political science at LMU Munich and the Munich School of Politics.

Bystron is married and has two children.

== Political career ==
He was a member of the Free Democratic Party (FDP) from 2006 to 2013.

In 2017 Bystron was monitored by the Bavarian Office for the Protection of the Constitution because of his close ties to the Identitarian movement. On extreme right-wing PI-News Bystron wrote that AfD had to be a "protective shield for this organisation". The German National Security Service named Bystron in his report about the monitoring of AfD as a party with anti-constitutional goals.

Bystron and Maximilian Krah were elected as the AfD's top candidates for the 2024 European Parliament election in Germany.

== Controversy ==
On 28 March 2024, Czech website Deník N and German newspaper Der Spiegel reported that the Czech Security Information Service (BIS) suspected that Bystron was also one of the recipients of funds from the pro-Russian Internet network "Voice of Europe" financed by the oligarch Viktor Medvedchuk.

In April 2024, the Munich Public Prosecutor's Office initiated preliminary investigations because of possible bribery of elected officials. According to Die Zeit, the Public Prosecutor's Office suspected that 20,000 euros were handed over at a meeting between Bystron and employees of Russian propaganda in Prague. On 3 April, AfD leaders Alice Weidel and Tino Chrupalla demanded a written explanation from Bystron for the allegations made against him. Maximilian Krah, another top AfD candidate for the European elections called for restraint in Bystron's election campaign.

The BIS informed the Intelligence Committee of the Czech Parliament on 18 April. A Member of Parliament reported to Deník N about a wiretapped conversation between Bystron and the pro-Russian Ukrainian businessman Artem Marchevsky in Prague, during which the BIS bugged Marchevsky's car. At the meeting, 20,000 euros was handed over to Bystron. On the tape, Bystron was reportedly heard counting the money.

The Bundestag lifted his immunity as a member of parliament and the LKA Bavaria carried out searches. Supported by eleven public prosecutors and almost 70 police officers, Bystron's parliamentary office in Berlin as well as properties on Mallorca, in the districts of Munich, Erding and Deggendorf were searched. Third parties who are not accused are also searched. Data carriers were seized “which are now being evaluated with regard to incriminating or exculpatory evidence.”

Bystron apparently left incriminating evidence with party friends. In the office of the employee of another AfD MP, the police found a roll container from Bystron containing documents proving payments to him. There they found also a list of gold bars and an exposé about a property in Brussels that cost around two million euros. The police also searched Katrin Ebner-Steiner and another AfD politician to find documents from Bystron.
