= Helma Orosz =

German politician

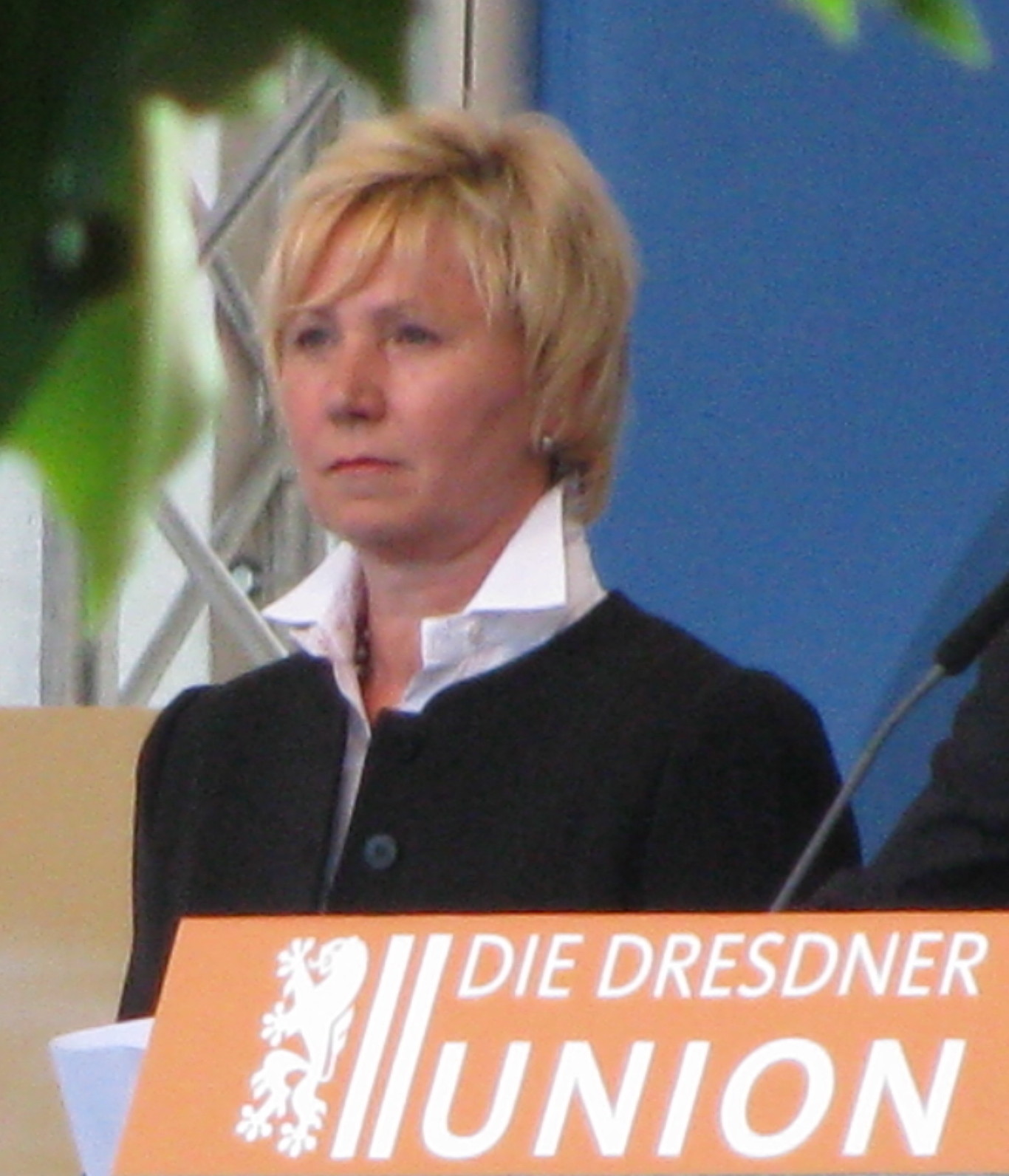
- Helma Orosz (2008)

Lord Mayor of Dresden
- In office June 2008 – 5 July 2015
- Preceded by: Ingolf Roßberg
- Succeeded by: Dirk Hilbert

Saxon Minister of Social Affairs
- In office 2003–2008

Mayor of Weißwasser
- In office 2001–2003

Personal details
- Born: 11 May 1953 (age 73) Görlitz, Bezirk Dresden, East Germany
- Citizenship: German
- Party: CDU

Helma Orosz ([ˈoros]; born 11 May 1953, in Görlitz) is a German politician and member of the CDU. She was the Saxon State Minister for Social Affairs between 2003 and 2008 and Oberbürgermeister (Lord Mayor) of Dresden from 2008 to 2015.

== Administrative work ==
Orosz worked as assistant director of a nursery school in Weißwasser since the 1970s. In 1989 she became leader of the district nursery school association, and in 1990 she was appointed head of Weißwasser district's department of health and social services. She kept that position when the district was merged into the Niederschlesischer Oberlausitzkreis.

== Political career ==
Orosz joined the CDU in 2000. She was elected mayor of Weißwasser in 2001. Saxon minister president Georg Milbradt appointed her minister of social affairs in 2003.

In 2008 Orosz was elected mayor of Dresden as a first woman in that function. She received 47.61% of the vote on the first ballot and 64% on the second ballot. Orosz campaigned as a representative of the progressive "urbane" wing of the CDU, in line with mayors Petra Roth of Frankfurt and Ole von Beust of Hamburg.

Orosz supported the construction of the Waldschlösschen Bridge which cost Dresden its status as a World Heritage Site. As a protest against the bridge artist Erika Lust in 2009 created a painting which depicted a bare-breasted Orosz in front of the bridge. Orosz obtained a preliminary injunction against public display of the painting, but the Higher Regional Court of Dresden judged the artistic freedom and the artist's freedom of expression more important than Orosz' personal rights. Orosz did not appeal to the Federal Constitutional Court.

In 2011 Orosz was diagnosed with breast cancer. She received medical treatment for ten months and re-assumed her duties in March 2012.

== Other activities ==
- Konrad Adenauer Foundation (KAS), Member of the Board of Trustees
