= Bernhard Herrmann =

German politician (born 1966)

Bernhard Herrmann (born 13 January 1966 in Luckenwalde) is a German politician for Alliance 90/The Greens and since 2021 member of the Bundestag, the federal diet.

== Education and profession ==
From 1982 to 1985, Herrmann trained as a skilled worker in hydraulic engineering. He then completed his basic military service until 1987. This was followed by a degree in hydraulic engineering at the Technical University of Dresden until 1992. From 1992 to 1997, he was employed as a graduate hydraulic engineer and project manager. He was then managing director of an engineering office for hydraulic engineering and environmental planning until 2009. Since 2010, he has been working as a freelancer in the field of water and decentralised energy management.

== Political activities ==
Herrmann has been active in the Chemnitz Green Alliance structures since 2006. From 2009 to 2014, he was an "expert resident" on the Chemnitz Planning, Building and Environment Committee. He has been a member of the Alliance 90/The Greens party since 2018. He has been a member of Chemnitz City Council since 2014 and has also held a seat on the Grüna local council since 2019. On the Chemnitz City Council, he is responsible for urban and regional development, energy, supply and disposal He is a member of the Committee for Urban Development and Mobility. The city council also elected him to the supervisory boards of Eissport und Freizeit GmbH, Verkehrslandeplatz Chemnitz/Jahnsdorf GmbH. Herrmann was elected to the Bundestag in 2021. In the election, he came seventh in the Chemnitzer Umland - Erzgebirgskreis II Bundestag constituency with 4.1% of the first votes and thus missed out on the direct mandate. However, he entered the 20th German Bundestag via second place on the state list of Bündnis 90/Die Grünen Sachsen. In the 2025 Bundestag election, Herrmann was the fourth candidate on the Saxony state list and failed to be re-elected to the Bundestag. He received 2.8% of the first votes in his constituency.

== Memberships ==
Herrmann is a member of the board of the Don Bosco Foundation Chemnitz.

== Personal life ==
Herrmann is a Roman Catholic. Together with three siblings, he grew up in the GDR. He is married and has three children.
