= Jörn Wunderlich =

German politician

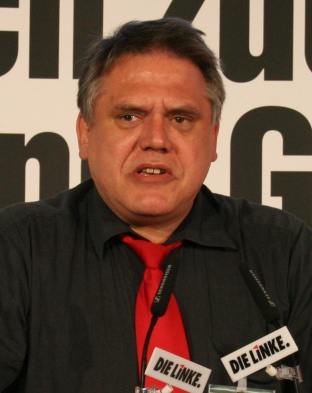

Member of the German Bundestag
- In office 2005–2017

Personal details
- Born: Jörn Heinz Adolf Wunderlich; 16 January 1960 (age 66) Gladbeck, Germany
- Party: The Left
- Children: 2
- Occupation: Politician

Heinz Adolf Jörn Wunderlich (born 16 January 1960 in Gladbeck) is a German politician for the Die Linke. He studied jurisprudence in Berlin and Göttingen. Since 2005 he is a member of the Bundestag.

== Biography ==
After graduating from high school in Aurich in 1978, Wunderlich studied law in Berlin and Göttingen, graduating in 1987 with the first state law examination. After completing his legal clerkship, he passed the second state examination in 1991. He then started as a public prosecutor at Chemnitz Regional Court and moved to Chemnitz Local Court as a judge in 1993.
