= Mike Moncsek =

German politician (born 1964)

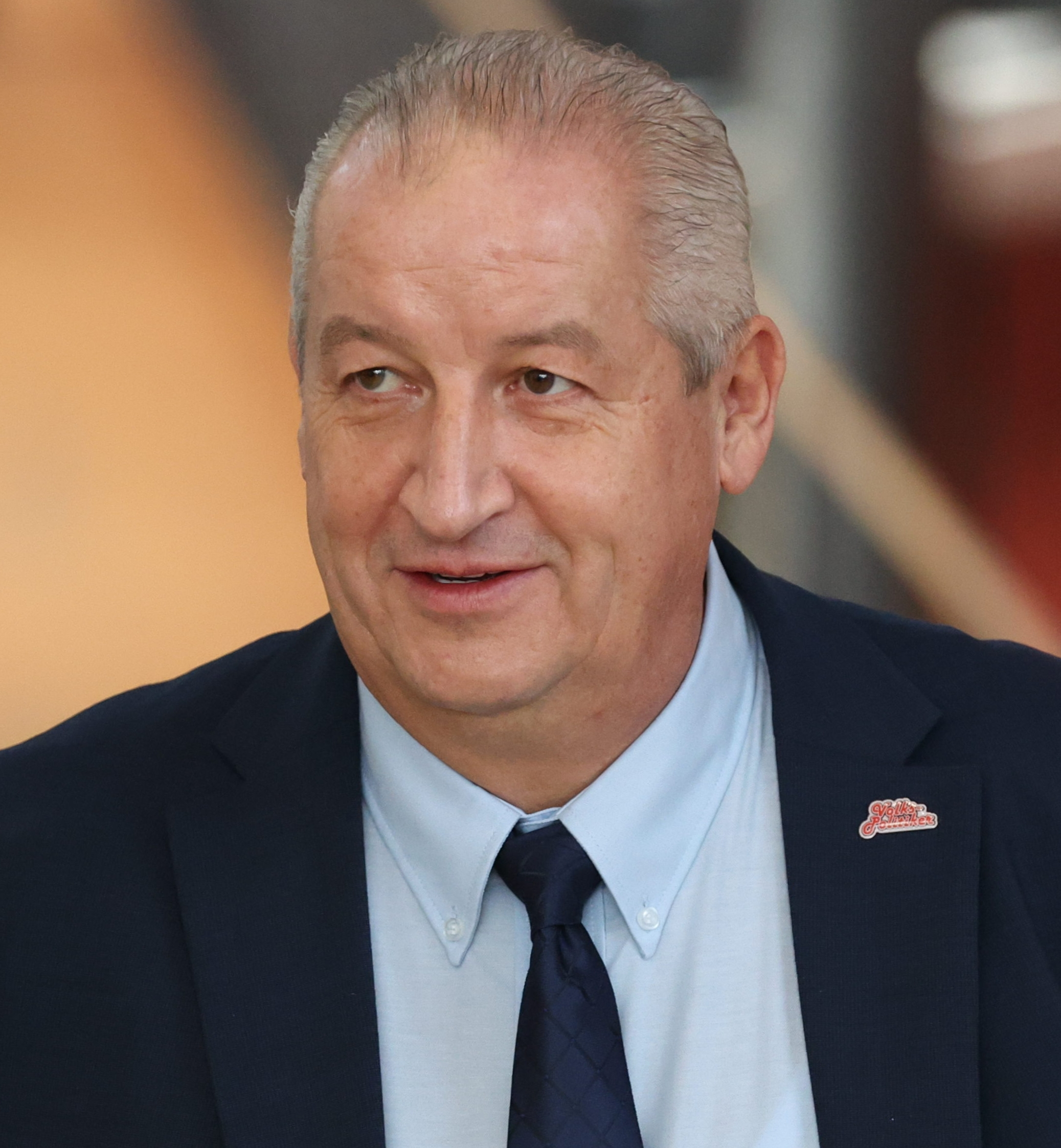
Mike Moncsek (2024)

Mike Moncsek (born 8 August 1964 in Freiberg, Saxony) is a German politician for the Alternative for Germany (AfD) political party and had been a member of the German Bundestag, the federal parliament, from 2021 to 2025. Since 2024 he is member of Landtag von Sachsen.

== Life and politics ==
Moncsek was born 1964 in Freiberg, East Germany. After graduating from polytechnic high school, he worked as a car mechanic and as a regional sales manager for the automotive industry. In the 2021 German federal election he won the direct mandate with 28.9% of the direct votes for the Chemnitzer Umland - Erzgebirgskreis II constituency. Before his election to the Bundestag, he had also served as district councillor in Central Saxony for the AfD. Since 2024 he is member of Landtag of Saxony.

Moncsek lives in Oberschöna in the district of Central Saxony and is a member of its local council.

== Political Positions ==
According to Moncsek, he joined the AfD in 2015 as a result of the refugee crisis in Germany due to negative personal experiences with refugees. He felt, that despite declining refugee numbers, there were too few controls at the borders. He "has no reservations against people coming here, but they have to be useful to the national product," Moncsek said in an interview with the Freie Presse. Moncsek intends to campaign in the Bundestag for the long-term preservation of the diesel engine and for the strengthening of small and medium-sized enterprises and individual tourism.
