= Albrecht Pallas =

German politician (born 1980)

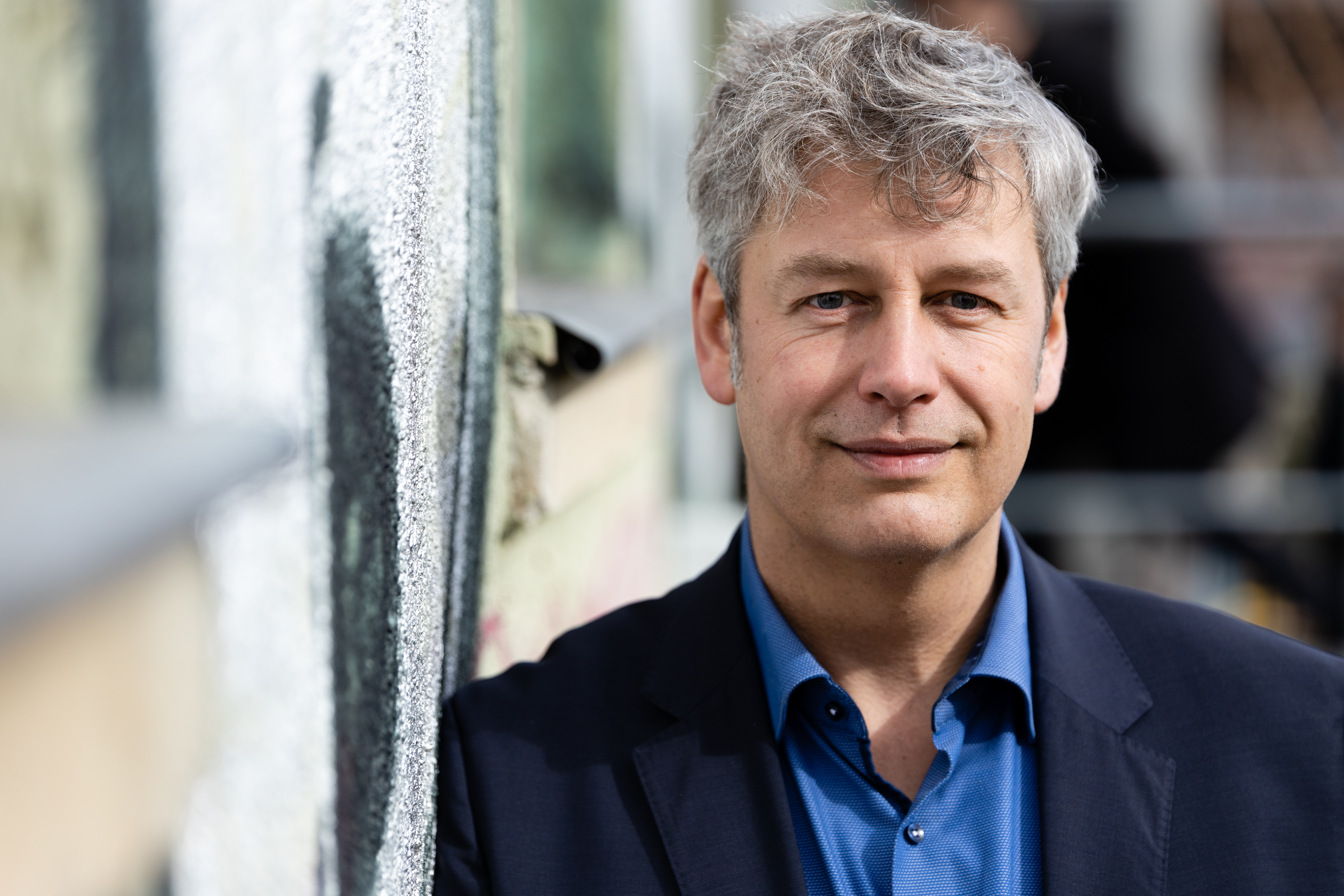
- Pallas in 2023

Member of the Landtag of Saxony
- Incumbent
- Assumed office 29 September 2014

Personal details
- Born: 17 February 1980 (age 46)
- Party: Social Democratic Party (since 2004)

Albrecht Pallas (born 17 February 1980) is a German politician serving as a member of the Landtag of Saxony since 2014. He has served as fourth vice president of the Landtag since 2024.
