= Dirk Hilbert =

German politician (born 1971)

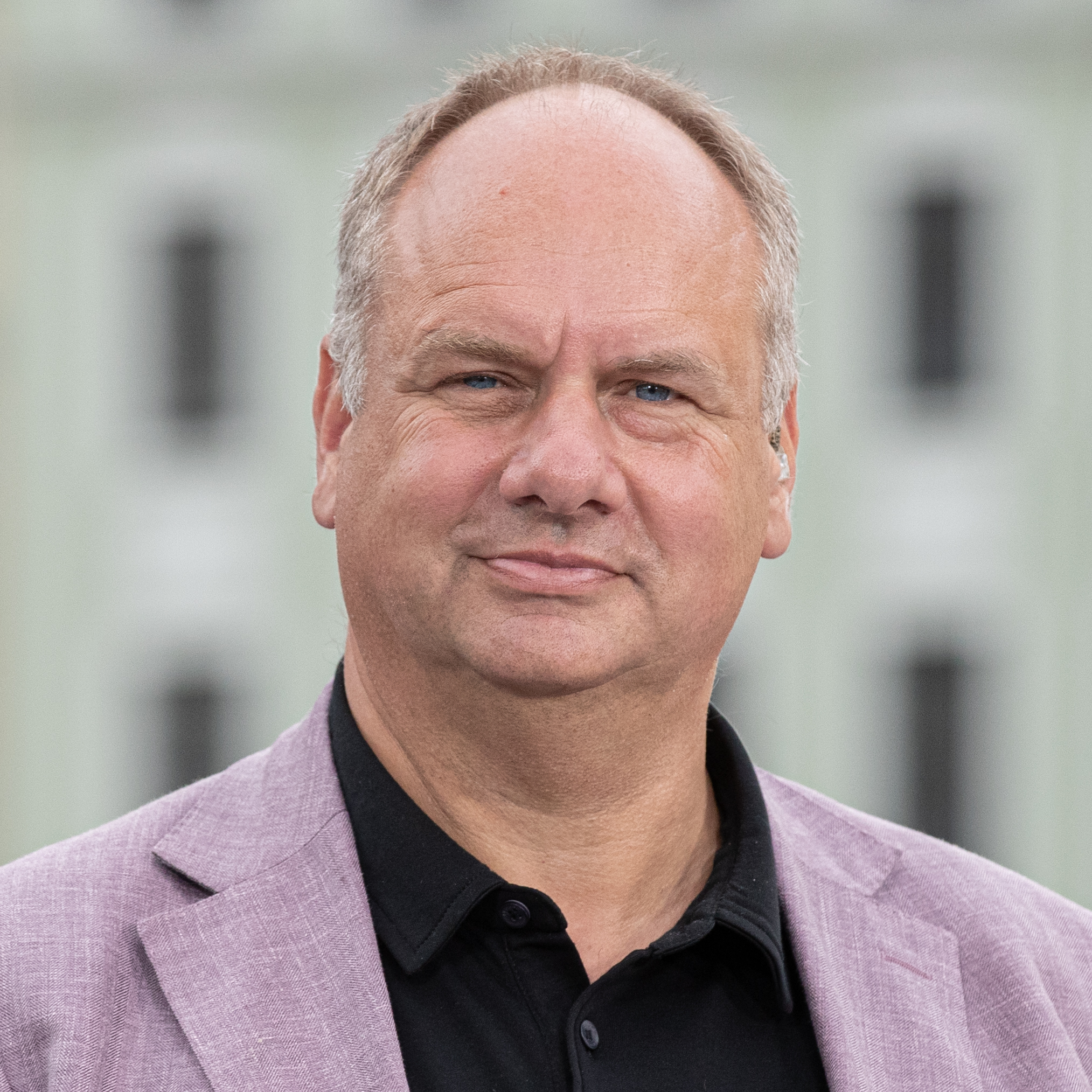
- Dirk Hilbert in 2025

Lord Mayor of Dresden
- Incumbent
- Assumed office 5 July 2015
- Preceded by: Helma Orosz

Personal details
- Born: 23 October 1971 (age 54) Dresden, East Germany
- Party: FDP

Dirk Hilbert (born 1971) is a German politician. A member of the Free Democratic Party (FDP), he has served as the current Lord Mayor of Dresden, the capital city of Saxony, since Helma Orosz's resignation in 2015.

== Early life and career ==
Hilbert studied industrial engineering at the Technical University of Dresden from 1992, and graduated in 1998 with a degree. From 1998 to 2000 he worked as a board assistant at the German Aerospace Center in Cologne, then in risk management at CargoLifter in Krausnick-Groß Wasserburg.

== Political career ==
From December 2008, Hilbert served as the Deputy Mayor of Lord Mayor Helma Orosz, and took over for her duties from February 2011 to March 1, 2012 due to the Mayor's illness. He became Lord Mayor upon Orosz's resignation in 2015.

== Other activities ==
- Max Planck Institute for Chemical Physics of Solids, Member of the Board of Trustees
- Max Planck Institute of Molecular Cell Biology and Genetics, Member of the Board of Trustees
- Max Planck Institute for the Physics of Complex Systems, Member of the Board of Trustees
