= August Joseph Pechwell =

German painter

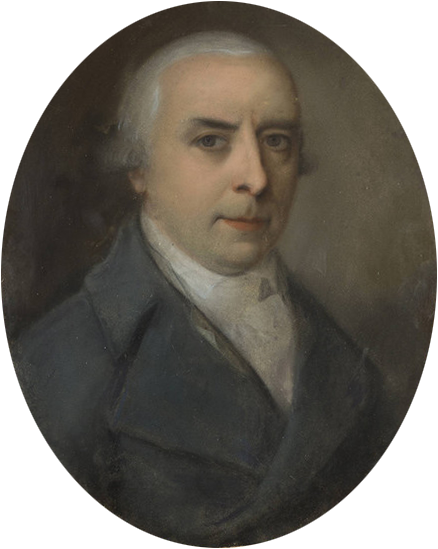
Portrait of August Joseph Pechwell

August Joseph Pechwell (1757–1811) was a German painter.

== Life ==
Pechwell was born at Dresden in 1757. He was instructed by Hutin, and afterwards went to Rome, where he remained till 1781. He painted altarpieces and portraits. He was Inspector of the Royal Gallery at Dresden. He died in 1811.

== Sources ==
Attribution:
