= Kügelgen =

Kügelgen was the surname of a family of famous German painters:

- Gerhard von Kügelgen (1772–1820), German painter, active in early romanticism, famous for his portraits and historical paintings
- Karl von Kügelgen (1772–1832), German painter, Gerhard's twin brother
- Wilhelm von Kügelgen (1802–1867), German painter, Gerhard's son
- Konstantin von Kügelgen (1810–1880), German painter, Karl's son

== See also ==
- 11313 Kügelgen, an asteroid named after Gerhard
