= Sally von Kügelgen =

Baltic-German painter (1860–1928)

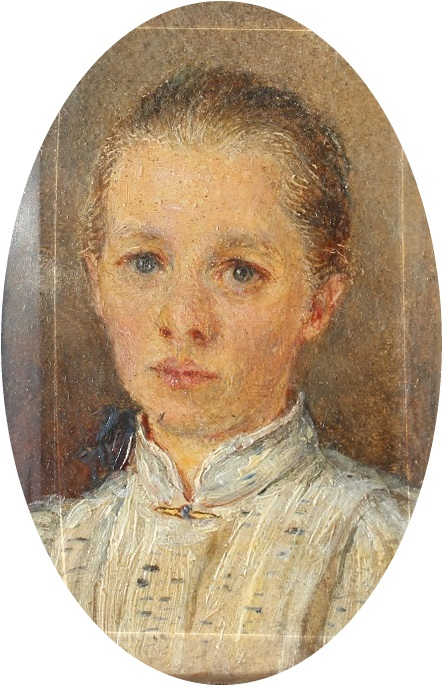
- Self portrait
- Born: Sally "Sarah Berta Jenny" von Kügelgen; 2 March 1860; Dorpat, Russian Empire
- Died: 16 October 1928 (aged 68); Rome, Italy
- Resting place: Protestant Cemetery, Rome
- Occupation: Painter
- Parents: Konstantin von Kügelgen (father); Antonie "née von Maydell" (mother)
- Relatives: Karl von Kügelgen (grandfather)

Sally "Sarah Barta Jenny" von Kügelgen (2 March 1860 – 16 October 1928) was a Baltic-German painter. She was the granddaughter of the painter Johann Karl Ferdinand von Kügelgen.

== Life ==
Sally (Sarah Berta Jenny) von Kügelgen was the daughter of the Baltic German landscape painter Konstantin von Kügelgen (1810–1880) and his wife Antonie (née von Maydell). Her grandfather was the German painter Karl von Kügelgen (1772–1832).

She first learned painting from her father. She then took lessons from Julie Wilhelmine Hagen-Schwarz (1824–1902). She completed her skills in Saint Petersburg with Ivan Kramskoi and as a guest student at the Imperial Academy of Arts in the Russian capital.

From 1890 Kügelgen lived mainly in Rome. However, she often visited her Baltic homeland, especially in the summer months.

She became known for her numerous portraits, but also for history pictures and the depiction of Bible scenes. Her most important work in Estonia are the frescoes about the life of Christ in Tallinn's Karlskirche (Kaarli kirik ). They were created in 1889 based on sketches that Carl Timoleon von Neff (1804–1876) had actually designed for St. Isaac's Cathedral . She also created the altar painting for the church in the Pilistvere in Livonia.

Sally von Kügelgen remained unmarried throughout her life. Kügelgen died on 16 October 1928 in Rome; she was interred into the Protestant Cemetery.

== Literature ==
- Leo von Kügelgen: Gerhard von Kügelgen. A painter's life around 1800 and the other seven artists in the family. Stuttgart 1924

== Paintings ==
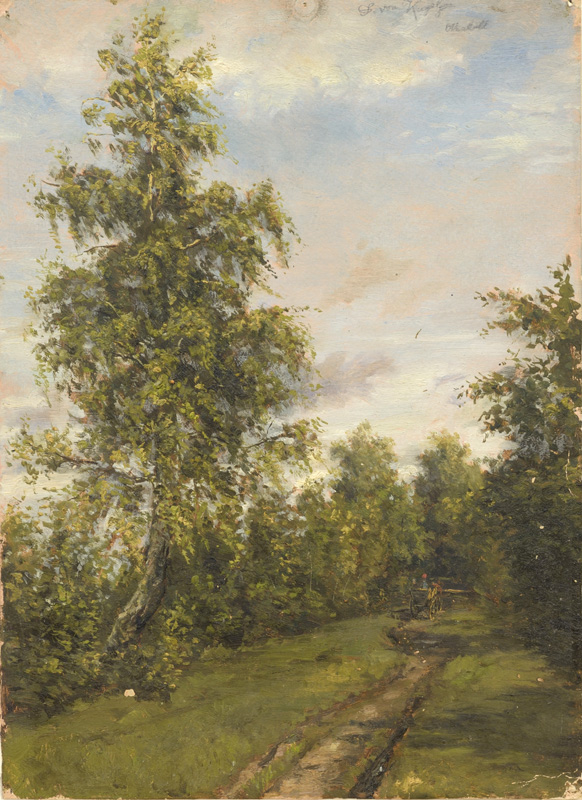

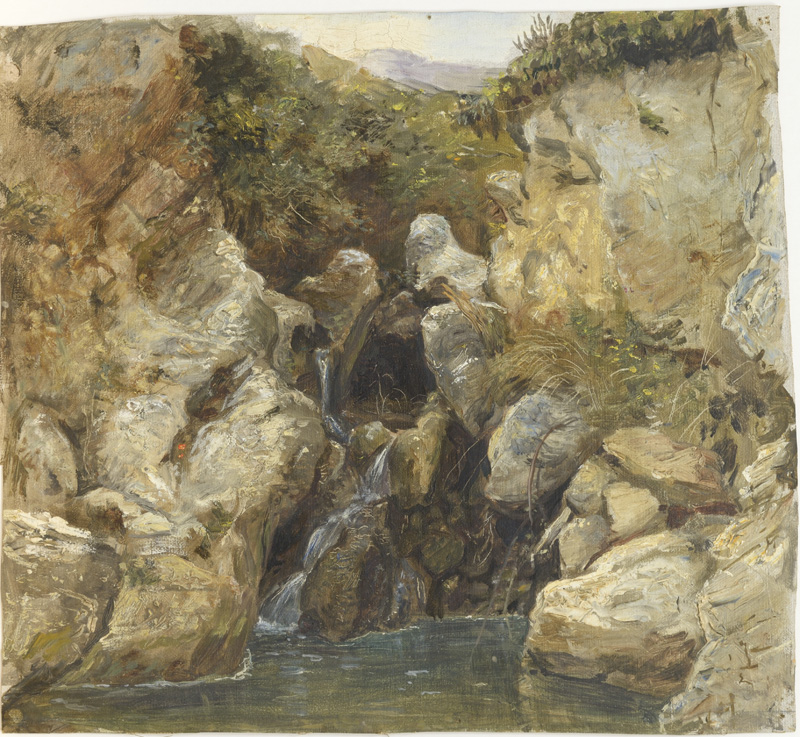

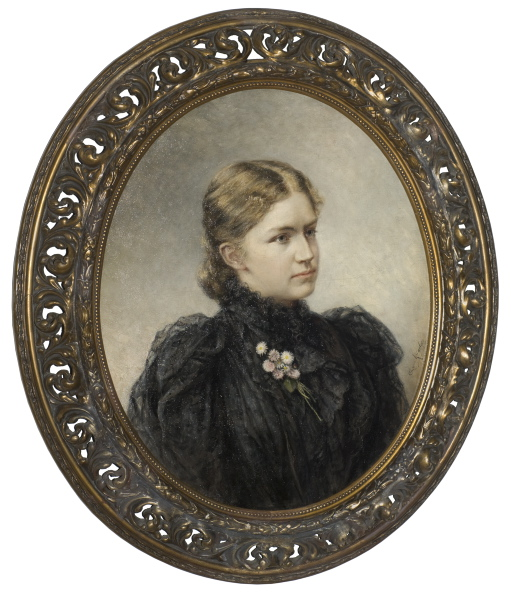

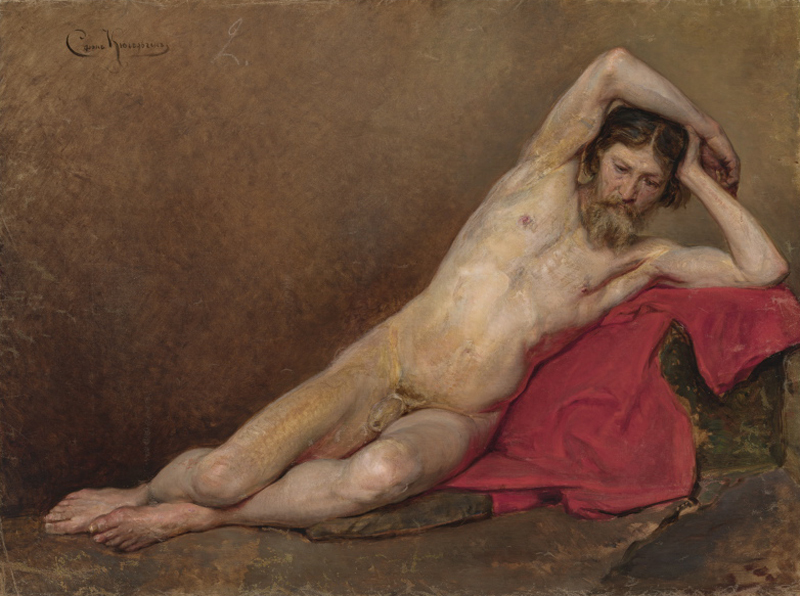

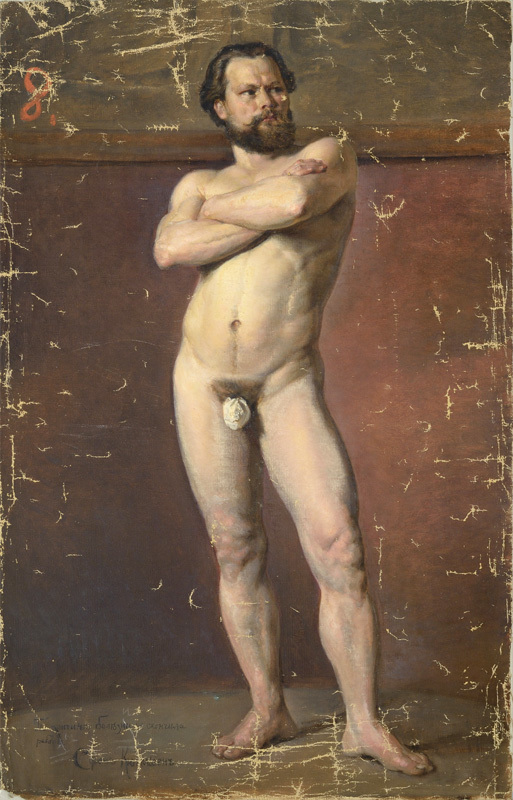

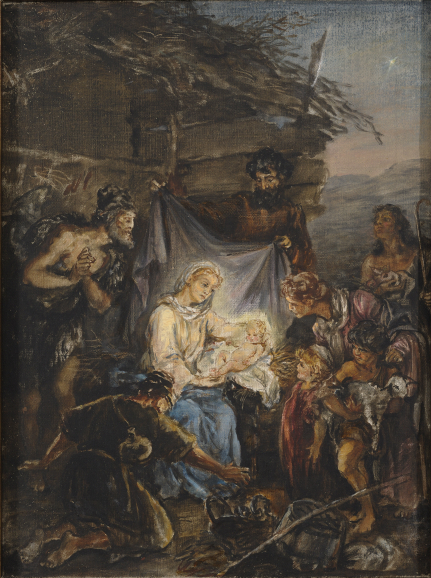

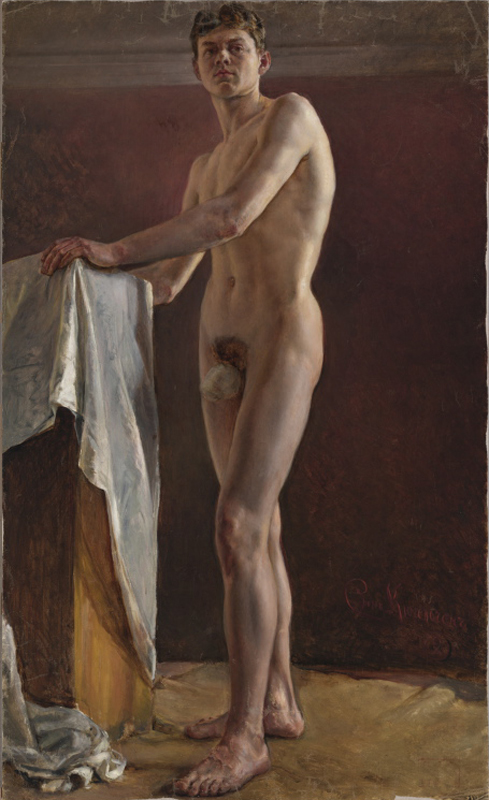
