= Bacharach =

- Town
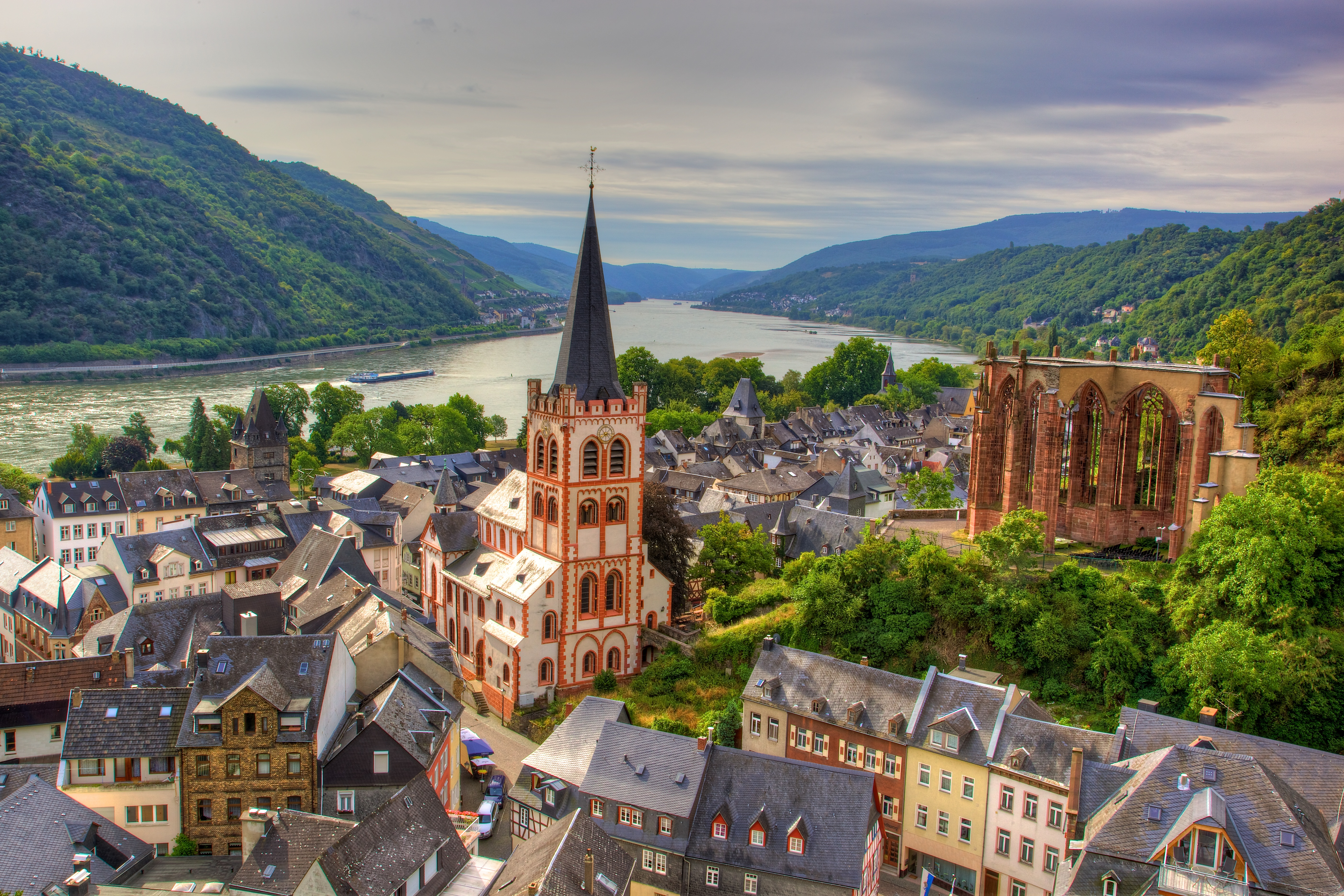
- Bacharach from the Postenturm.

- Coat of arms

- Location of Bacharach within Mainz-Bingen district
- Interactive map of Bacharach
- Location within Germany Location within Rhineland-Palatinate
- Coordinates: 50°04′N 07°46′E
- Country: Germany
- State: Rhineland-Palatinate
- District: Mainz-Bingen
- Municipal assoc.: Rhein-Nahe

Area
  - Total: 23.35 km^{2} (9.02 sq mi)
- Elevation: 70 m (230 ft)

Population (2025-12-31)
  - Total: 1,525
  - Density: 65.31/km^{2} (169.2/sq mi)
- Time zone: UTC+01:00 (CET)
  - Summer (DST): UTC+02:00 (CEST)
- Postal codes: 55422
- Dialling codes: 06743
- Vehicle registration: MZ
- Website: www.bacharach.de

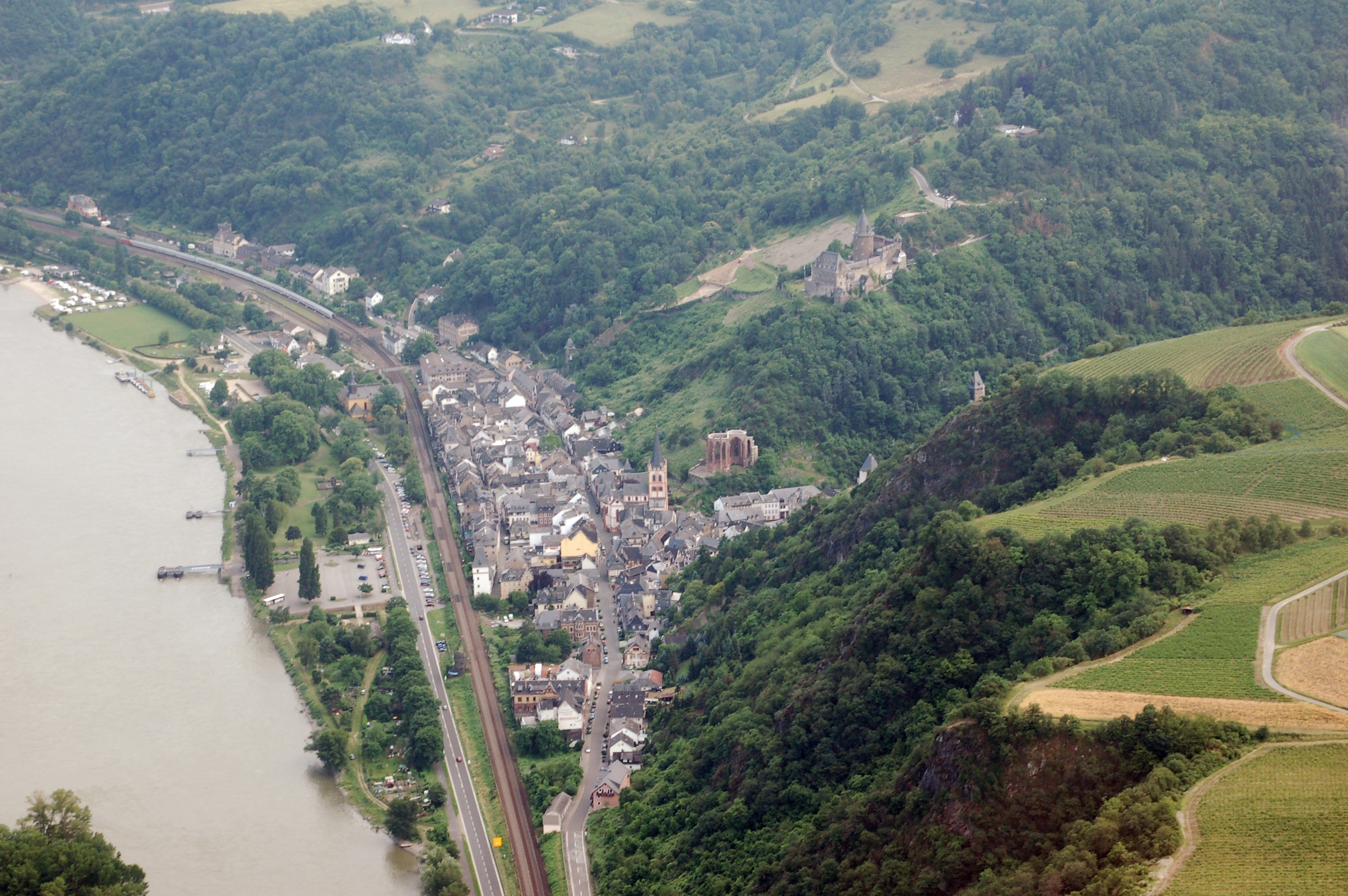
Aerial photograph 2007

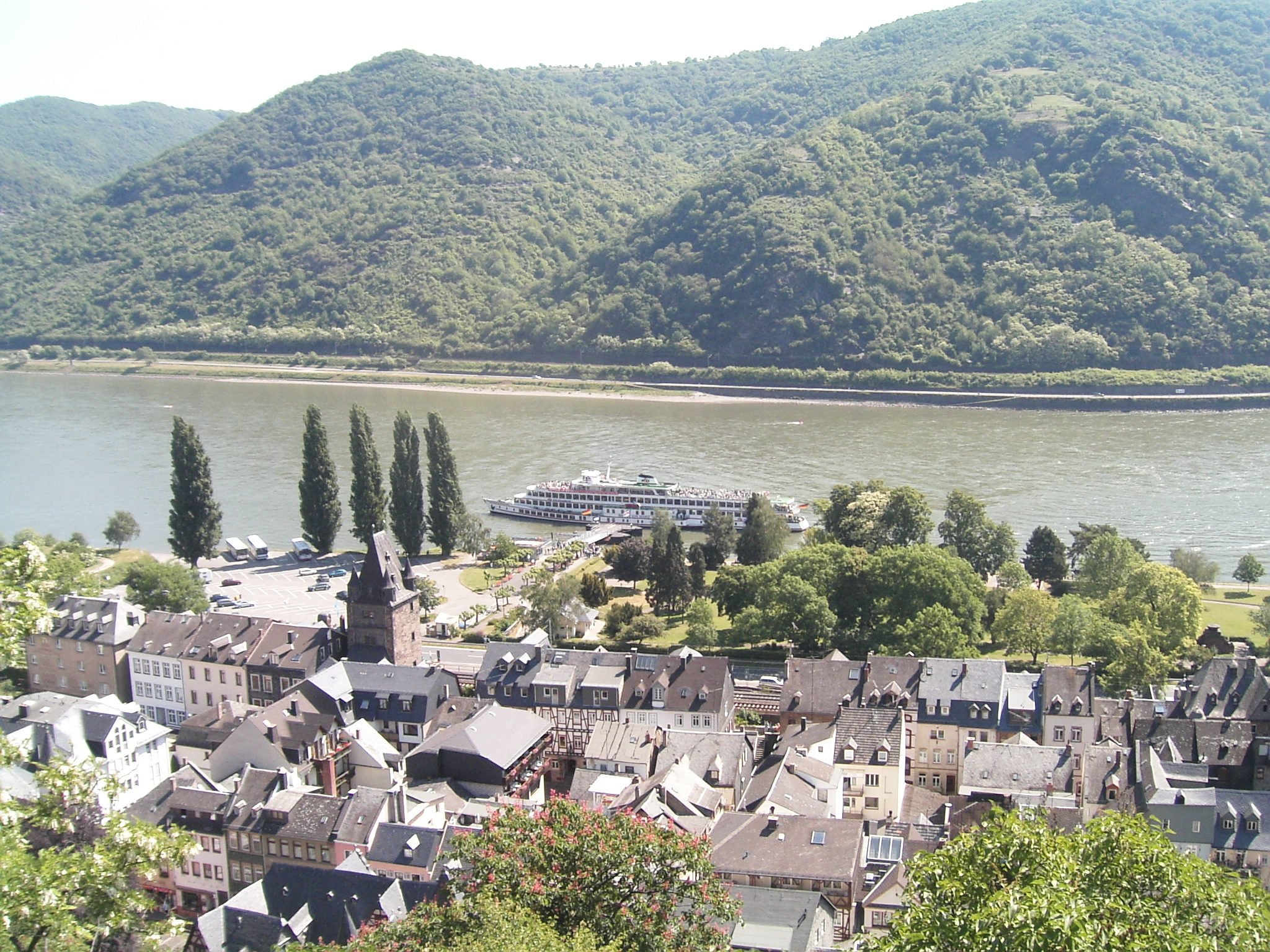
Rhine in Bacharach, view from Castle Stahleck

Bacharach (German pronunciation: [ˈbaxaʁax], also known as Bacharach am Rhein) is a town in the Mainz-Bingen district in Rhineland-Palatinate, Germany. It belongs to the Verbandsgemeinde of Rhein-Nahe, whose seat is in Bingen am Rhein, although that town is not within its bounds.

The original name Baccaracus suggests a Celtic origin. Above the town stands Stahleck Castle (Burg Stahleck), now a youth hostel.

== Geography ==
=== Location ===
The town lies in the Rhine Gorge, 48 km south of Koblenz.

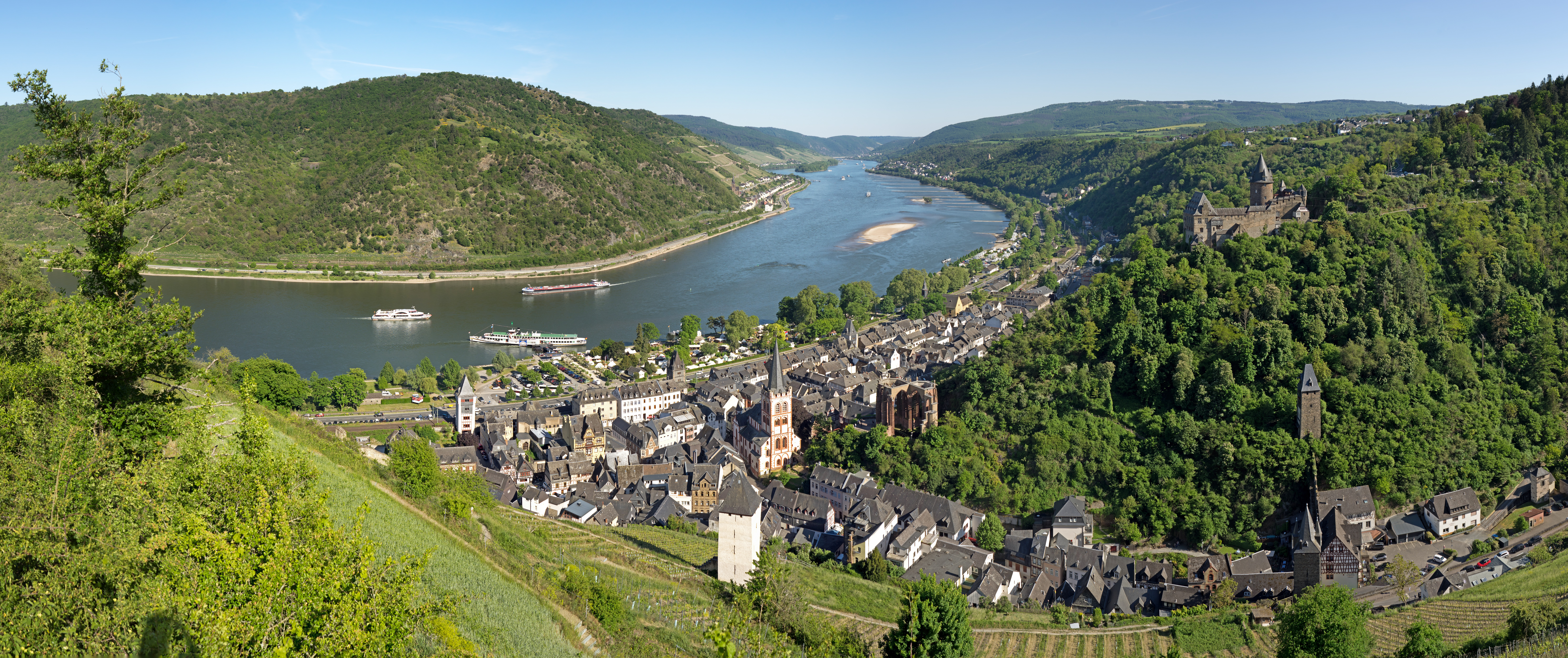
View of Bacharach

=== Constituent communities ===
Bacharach is divided into several Ortsteile. The outlying centre of Steeg lies in the Steeg Valley (Steeger Tal) off to the side, away from the Rhine. This glen lies between Medenscheid and Neurath to the south and Henschhausen to the north on the heights.

== History ==
In the early 11th century, Bacharach had its first documentary mention. It may have been that as early as the 7th century, the kingly domain passed into Archbishop of Cologne Kunibert’s ownership; pointing to this is a Kunibertskapelle (chapel) on the spot where now stands the Wernerkapelle. The Vögte of the Cologne estate were the Elector of the Palatinate, who over time pushed back Cologne’s influence. Count Palatine already had so much influence that he resided at Stahleck Castle. His successor Konrad von Staufen’s daughter secretly wed at Stahleck Castle a son of the Welfs, who were family foes, leading to Bacharach’s, and indeed the whole County Palatine’s, falling for a short time to Henry of Brunswick. In 1214 the Wittelsbachs became Bacharach’s new lords. Together with the Unteramt of Kaub they received here their most important toll and revenue source. In 1314 it was decided to choose Louis the Bavarian as the German king. Furthermore, Bacharach was the most important transfer point for the wine trade, as barrels were offloaded here from the smaller ships that were needed to get by the Binger Loch (a quartzite reef in the Rhine upstream near Bingen) and loaded onto bigger ones. From then on, the wine bore the designation Bacharacher. The timber trade from the Hunsrück also brought Bacharach importance, and in 1356, Bacharach was granted town rights.

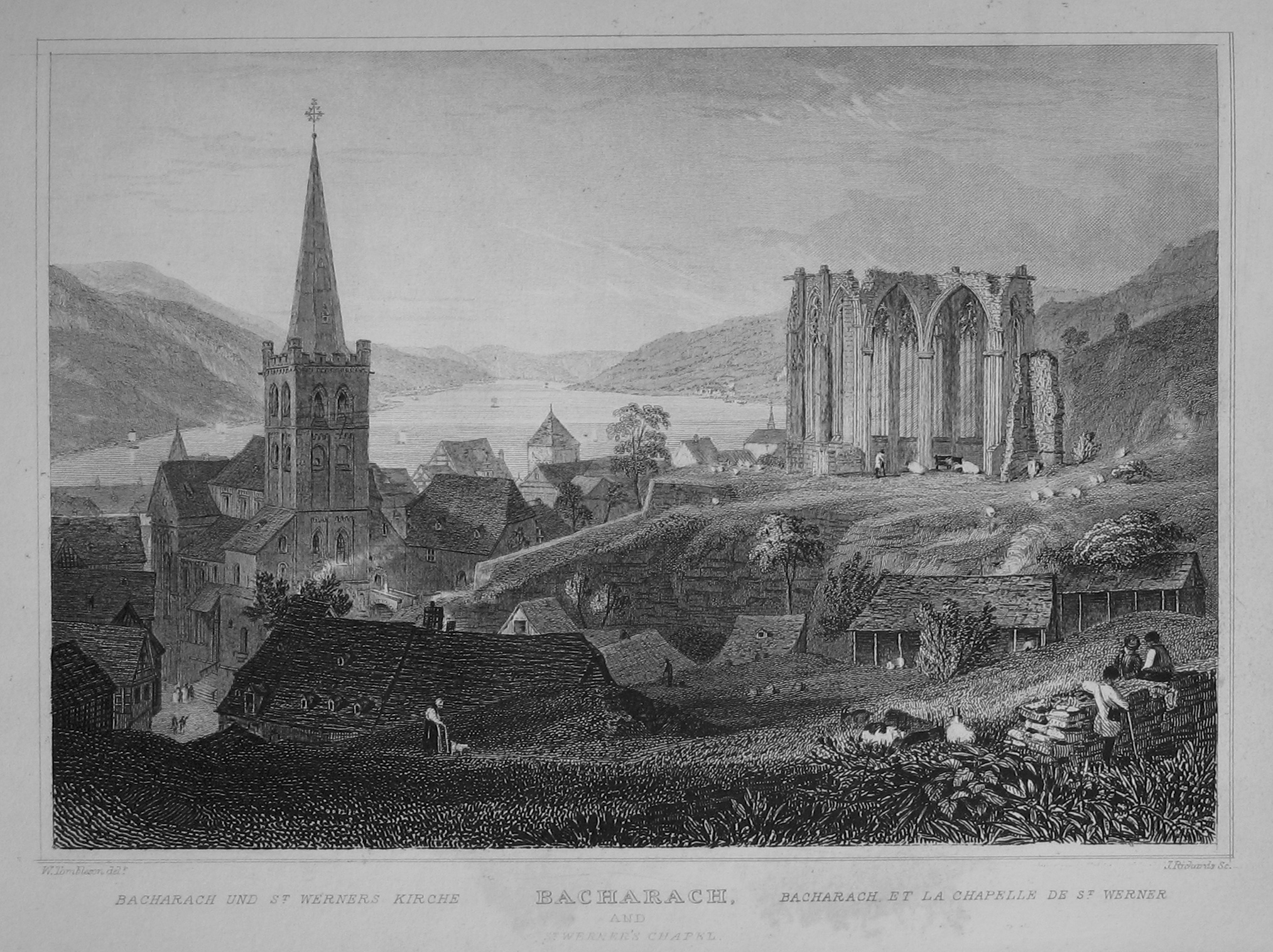
Wernerkapelle in an engraving by William Tombleson

Widely visible is the Wernerkapelle, a Rheinromantik landmark of the town, lying on the way up to Stahleck Castle from the town. It is the expanded Kunibertkapelle, and is still an unfinished Gothic ruin today. Its namesake is Werner of Oberwesel, known in connection with pogroms triggered by his death. According to the Christian blood libel, which was typical of the times, a 16-year-old Werner was murdered on Maundy Thursday 1287 by members of the local Jewish community, who then used his blood for Passover observances. On the grounds of this alleged ritual murder, there arose an anti-Semitic mob who waged a pogrom, wiping out Jewish communities in the Middle and Lower Rhine and Moselle regions. In folk Christianity arose the cult of Werner, which was only stricken from the Bishopric of Trier calendar in 1963.

In 1344, building work began on the town wall, and was already finished about 1400. In 1545, the town, along with the Palatinate, became Protestant under Count Palatine Friedrich II. Stahleck Castle and the town wall could not stop Bacharach from undergoing eight changes in military occupation in the Thirty Years' War, nor the war’s attendant sackings. Moreover, further destruction was wrought by several town fires. Then, in 1689, French troops fighting in the Nine Years' War blew Stahleck Castle and four of the town wall’s towers up.

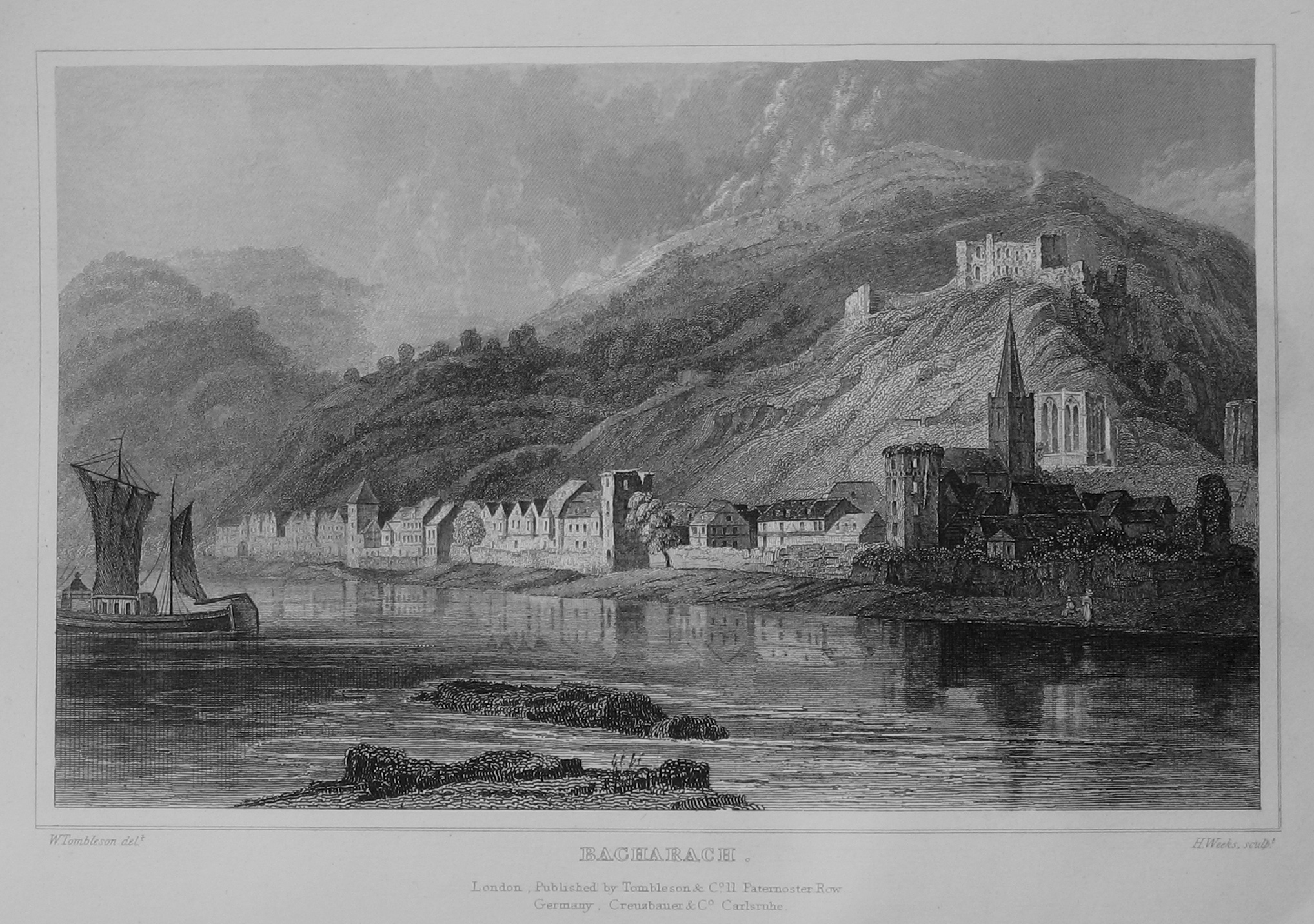
Bacharach about 1832 in an engraving by William Tombleson

In 1794, French Revolutionary troops occupied the Rhine’s left bank and in 1802, Bacharach became temporarily French. During the War of the Sixth Coalition the Prussian Field Marshal Blücher, after crossing the Rhine near Kaub, came through Bacharach and the Steeg Valley on New Year’s Night 1813-1814 with his troops on the way to France. Recalling this event is a monument stone somewhat downstream, across from Kaub. After the Congress of Vienna, the town went, along with the Rhine’s left bank, up to and including Bingerbrück, to Prussia. After the harbour silted up, Bacharach fell into a slumber from which it only awoke in the course of the Rheinromantik. Among the first of the prominent visitors at this time was the French writer Victor Hugo.

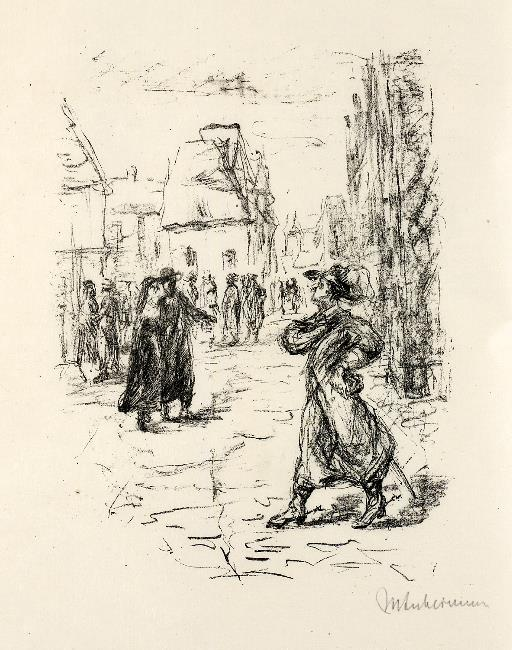
Illustration by Max Liebermann for Heinrich Heine's historical novel Der Rabbi von Bacherach (The Rabbi of Bacherach)

Early 20th-century preservation efforts by the Rhenish Association for Monument Care and Landscape Preservation (Rheinischer Verein für Denkmalpflege und Landschaftsschutz) led to the restoration of the town wall and Stahleck Castle. Subsequent conservation work supported by the state of Rhineland-Palatinate, particularly on the Wernerkapelle, contributed to the preservation of Bacharach's medieval architecture. The protected Wernerkapelle ruins feature a plaque commemorating the persecution of local Jewish residents; the marker includes an excerpt from a prayer by Pope John XXIII addressing Christian-Jewish relations:

“We recognize today that many centuries of blindness have shrouded our eyes, so that we no longer saw the goodliness of Thy Chosen People and no longer recognized our firstborn brother’s traits. We discover now that a mark of Cain stands on our forehead. In the course of the centuries our brother Abel has lain in blood that we spilt, and he has wept tears that we brought forth, because we forgot Thy love. Forgive us the curse that we unrightfully affixed to the Jews’ name. Forgive us for nailing Thee in their flesh for a second time to the Cross. For we knew not what we did........."

Today Bacharach thrives on tourism and wine from Bacharach is still enjoying international popularity. Not to be overlooked, however, are problems arising from a shrinking population, itself brought about by a lack of prospects.

=== Amalgamations ===
On 7 June 1969, the formerly self-administering municipality of Steeg was amalgamated with Bacharach.

=== Town partnerships ===
- Overijse, Flemish Brabant, Belgium
- Santenay, Côte-d'Or, France

=== Coat of arms ===
The town’s arms might be described thus: Per fess at the nombril point sable a lion rampant Or armed, langued and crowned gules, and bendy lozengy argent and azure.

== Population development ==
The number 1871-1987 are census results

Year	Inhabitants
1815	1.794
1835	2.342
1871	2.511
1905	2.859
1939	2.746
1950	3.091

Year	Inhabitants
1961	2.853
1970	2.712
1987	2.184
1997	2.268
2005	2.097
2025	1525

== Economy and infrastructure ==
=== Transport ===
Bacharach lies on the Rhine’s left bank and can be reached by Bundesstraße 9 or the Rhine. Running regularly to and from Bacharach are the excursion ships of the Köln-Düsseldorfer-Rheinschiffahrt, or KD for short.

Transport routes on the other side of the river can be reached by ferry from the Engelsburg (castle) over to Kaub.

The town belongs to the Rhein-Nahe-Nahverkehrsverbund – a local transport association. Bacharach lies on the West Rhine Railway and is served by Cologne - Koblenz—Boppard—Bacharach—Bingen am Rhein—Mainz Regionalbahn trains (as of August 2022).

== Culture and sightseeing ==
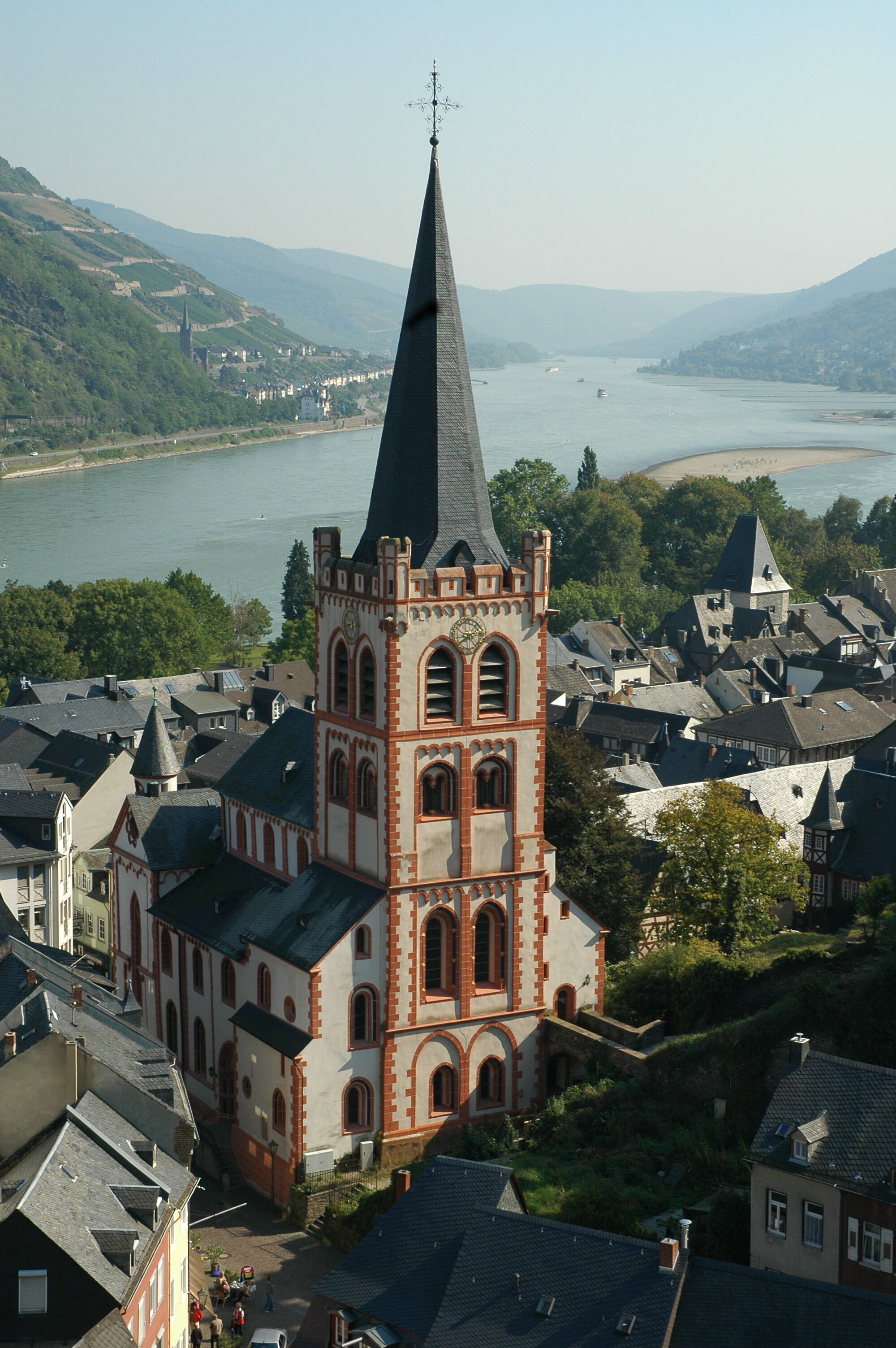
Saint Peter’s

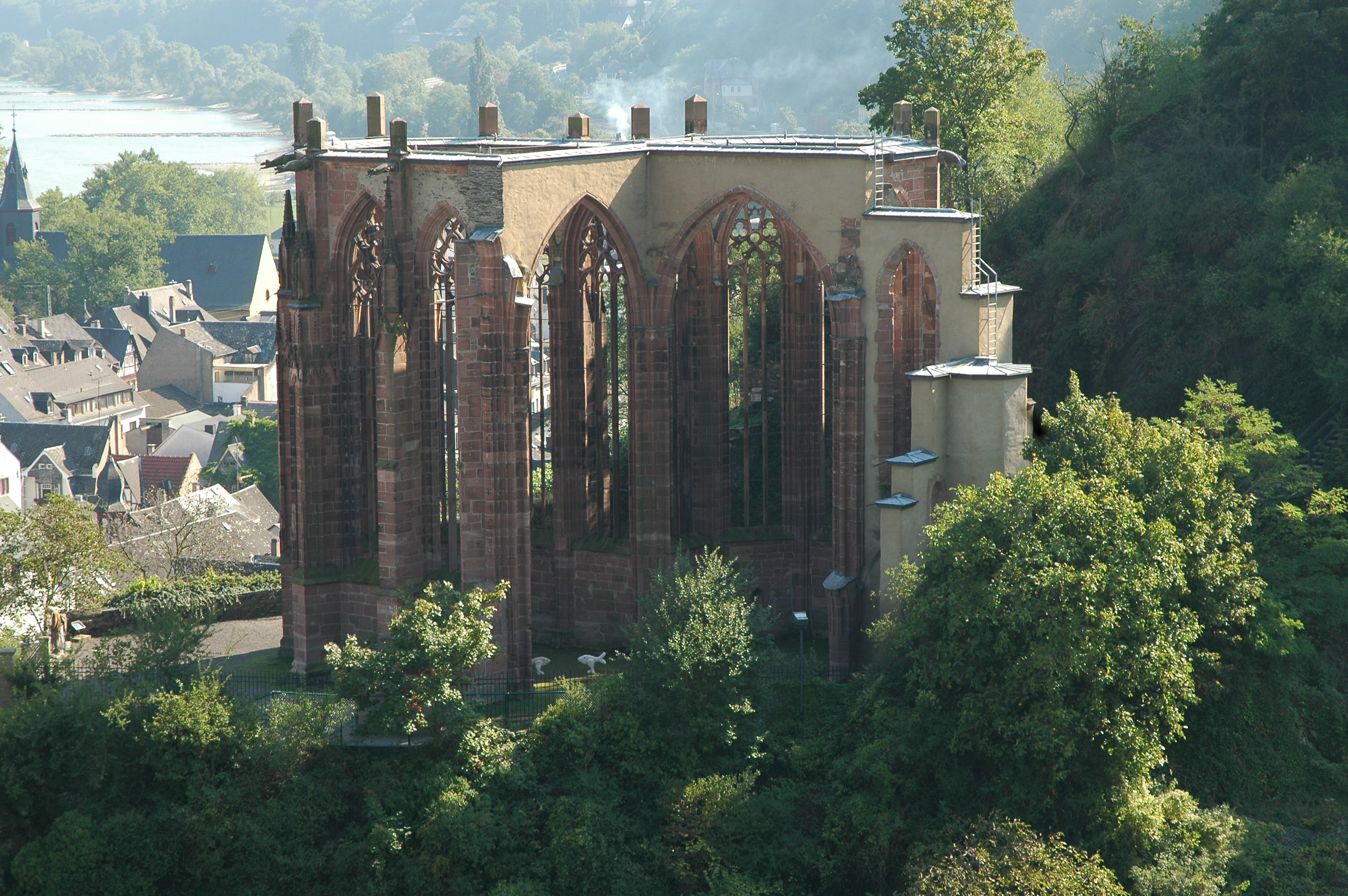
Wernerkapelle

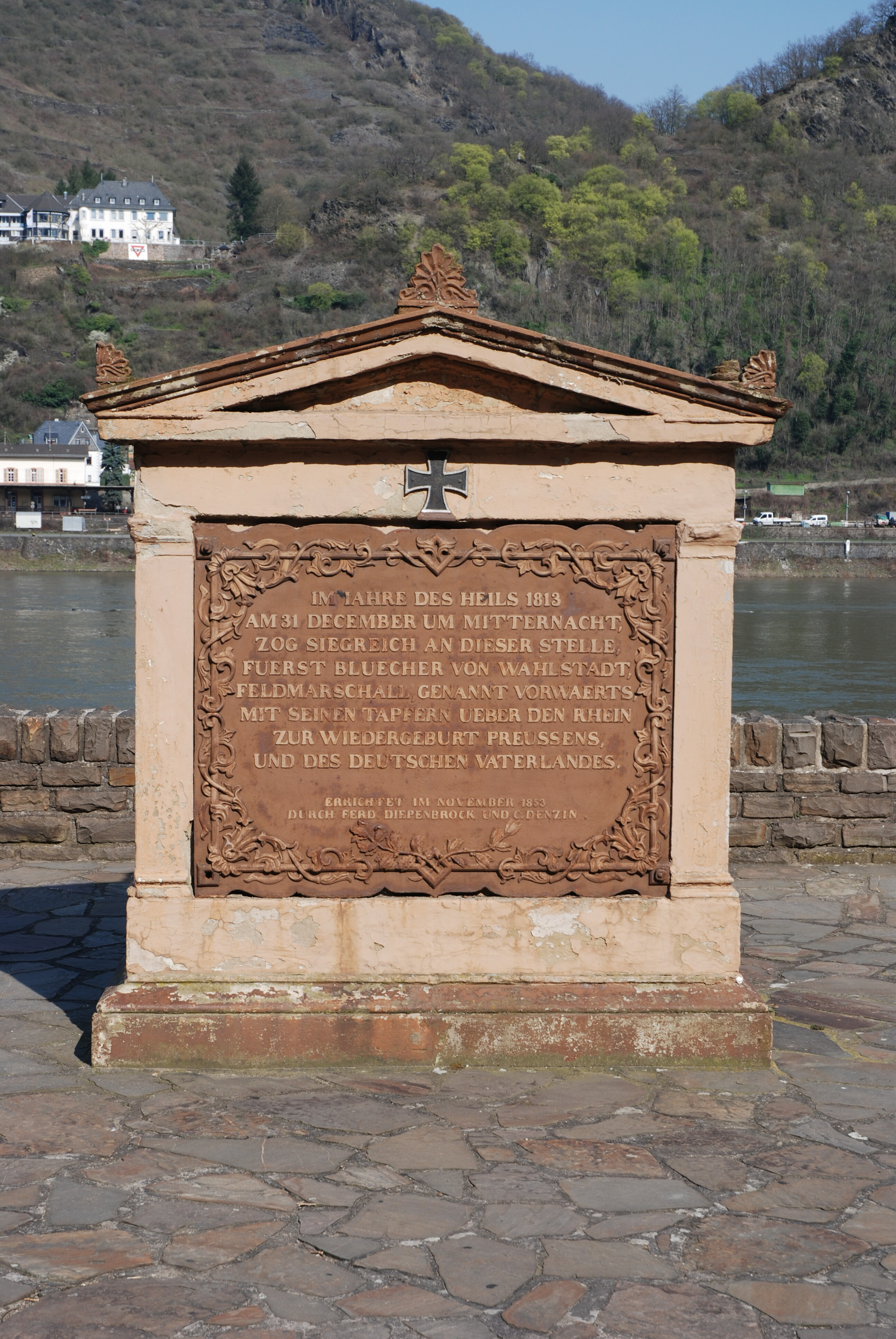
Blücher monument stone

- Timber-frame houses, which can be found throughout the town. A whole row of them borders Bacharach along with the town wall along the Rhine.
- Altes Haus (“Old House”), mediaeval timber-frame house from 1368
- Haus Utsch from 1585; in its time, Friedrich Wilhelm Utsch, the Jäger aus Kurpfalz (“Hunter from the Electorate of the Palatinate” – a character in a well known song) lived there.
- Old postal station
- Old marketplace
- Electorate of the Palatinate Amt wine cellar
- Former Electorate of the Palatinate mint
- Toll yard with Saint Nicholas’s Catholic Church
- Saint Peter’s Evangelical Church
- Ruin of the Gothic Wernerkapelle
- Saint Joseph's Catholic Chapel
- Town wall ringing Bacharach, parts of which may be visited
- Town wall towers: Diebesturm (“Thief’s Tower”, remnants), Zehnt-turm (“Tithe Tower”), Spitzenturm (“Pointed Tower”, remnants), Postenturm (“Post Tower”), Holztor (“Wooden Gate”, also called Steeger Tor), Liebesturm (“Love Tower”), Halbturm (“Half Tower”, remnants), Kühlbergturm (“Kühlberg Tower”, remnants), Sonnenturm (“Sun Tower”, remnants), Hutturm (“Hat Tower”), Zollturm (no longer existing), Kranentor, Markttor (“Market Gate”), Münztor (“Mint Gate”), Winandturm (“Winand’s Tower”). The town fortifications are among the best preserved in Rhineland-Palatinate.
- Island in the Rhine, the Bacharacher Werth.
- Stahleck Castle (Burg Stahleck)
- Remnants of a Roman road up from Stahleck Castle
- Stahlberg Castle (Burg Stahlberg) above Bacharach-Steeg
- Blücher monument stone at the Rhine ferry

=== Bacharach in art ===
- Heinrich Heine: Der Rabbi von Bacherach [sic] 1840. Text at: , also a further 2 of Heine’s poems on the heritage theme
  - dsb., Gedicht "Ich weiß nicht, was soll es bedeuten..." also a list of all together 9 musical versions of the Heine poem
- Clemens Brentano: Loreley-Gedicht: „Zu Bacharach am Rheine …“
- Gerd Hergen Lübben: „DER TEXTFUND ZU BACHERACH [VORSATZ / »VOM HEILIGEN WERNER UND POGROM IN BACHERACH AM RHEIN« / NACHKLANG]“. In: DIE BRÜCKE – Forum for antiracist politics and culture, Heft 140, 2/2006 (Saarbrücken), S. 126-128
- Guillaume Apollinaire: poem LA LORELEY In: Œuvres poétiques, Gallimard, Paris 1965, S. 115f, in German and French in: S. 48f.- set to music by Dmitri Shostakovich

=== Regular events ===
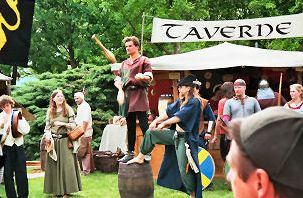
Impression of the Vierthälermarkt 2007

- Kulinarische Sommernacht (“Culinary Summer Night”, every fourth weekend in August)
- Boules tournament
- Tal to Tal – car-free adventure day, upper Rhine Gorge (every last Sunday in June)
- Vierthälermarkt – mediaeval market in Bacharach

=== Notable people ===
Gerhard von Kügelgen

- Gerhard von Kügelgen, (1772–1820), painter
- Karl von Kügelgen, (1772–1832), landscape and historical painter, Russian court and cabinet painter
- Hans Meinhard von Schönberg, (1582–1616), Electorate of the Palatinate and Electorate of Brandenburg field colonel (Feldobrister) and the Winter King’s Hofmeister

== Gallery ==
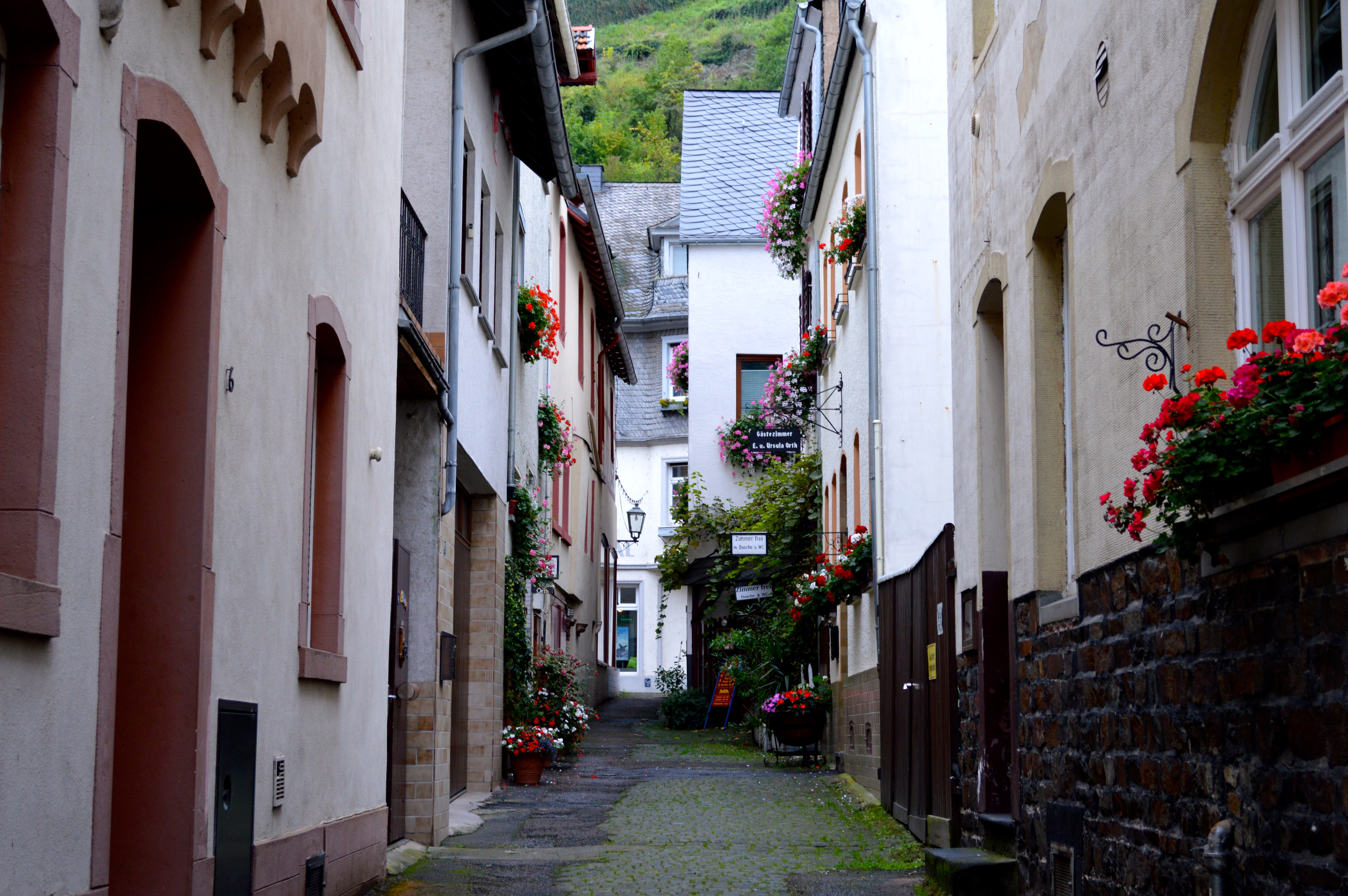
A street in Bacharach

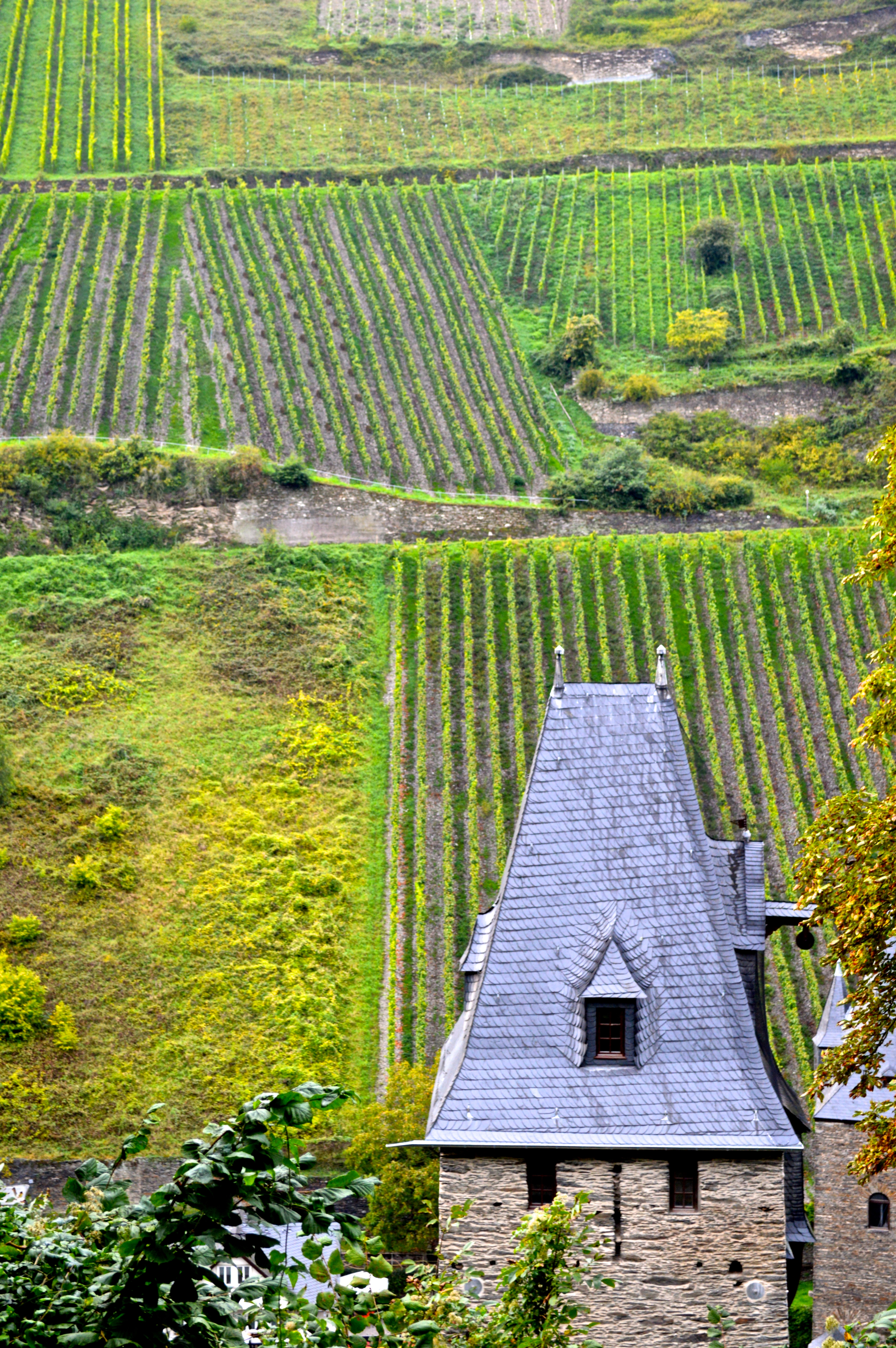
Agriculture on the hills above Bacharach

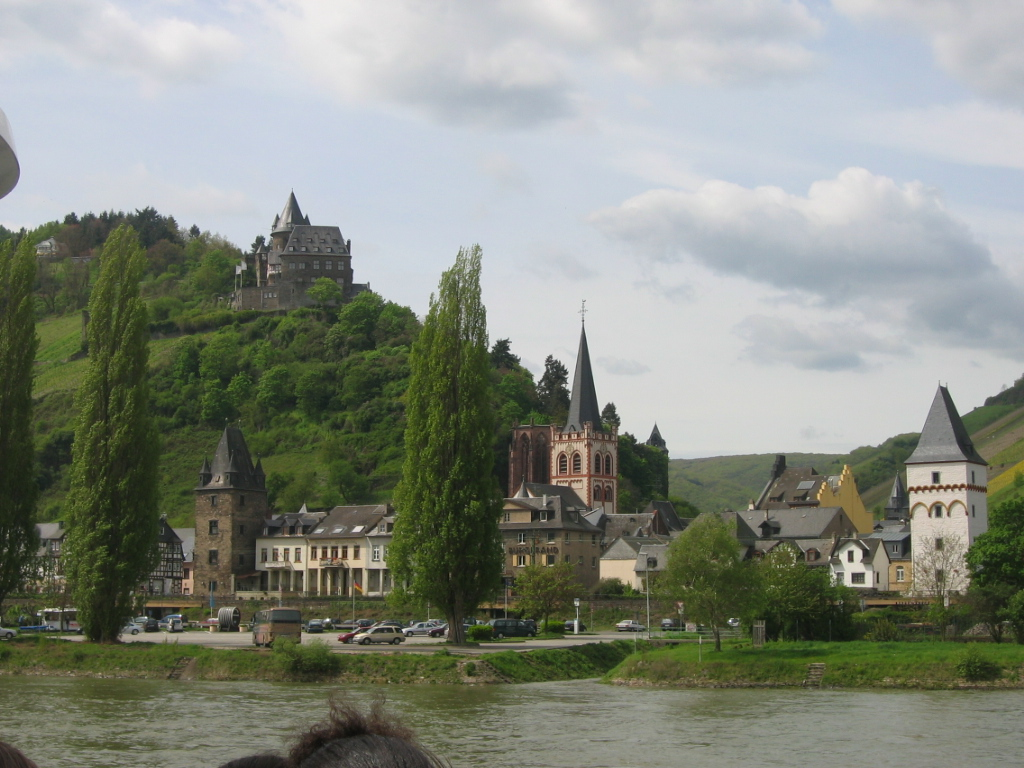
Bacharach

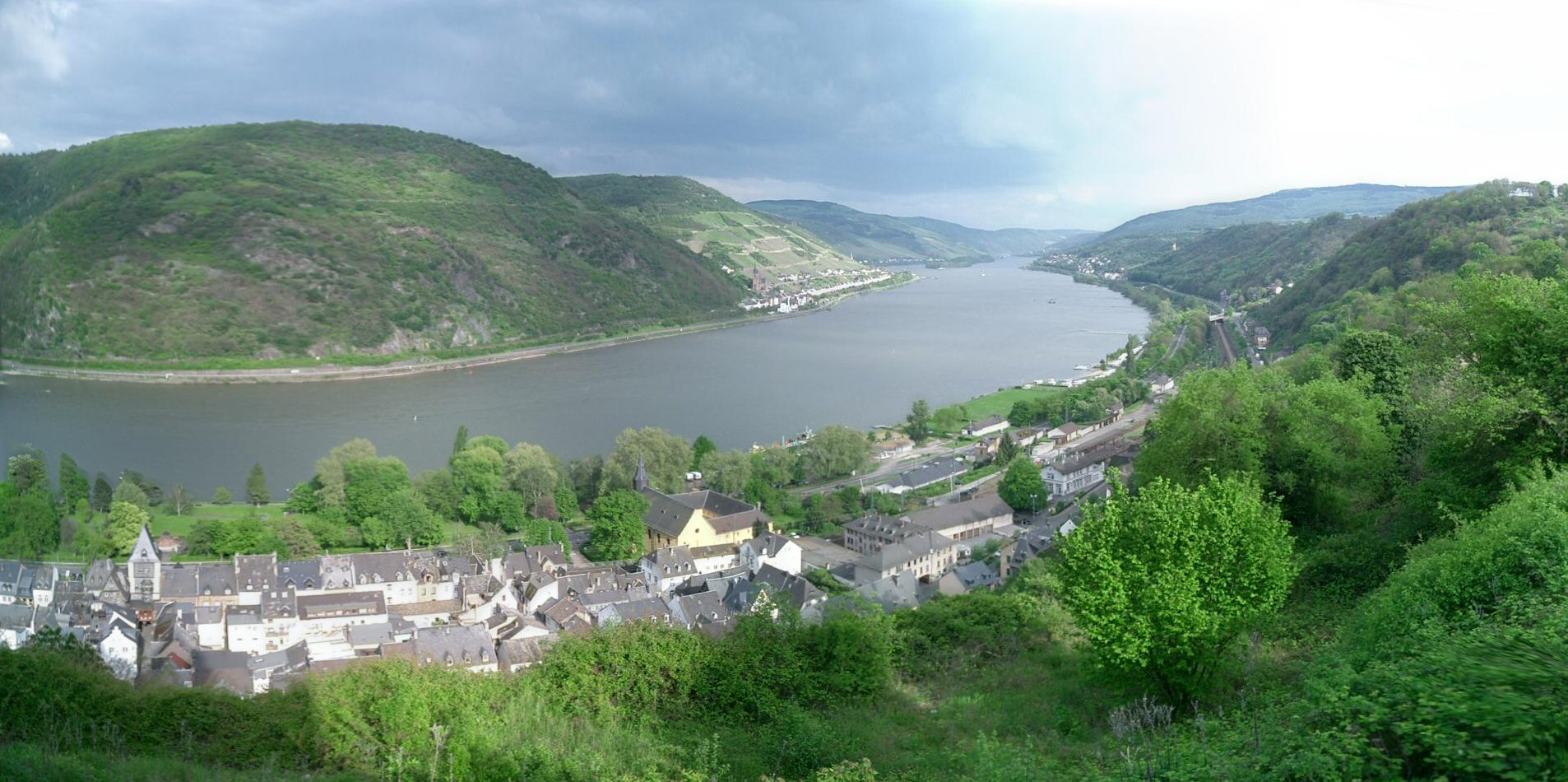
View of the Rhine from
Stahleck Castle

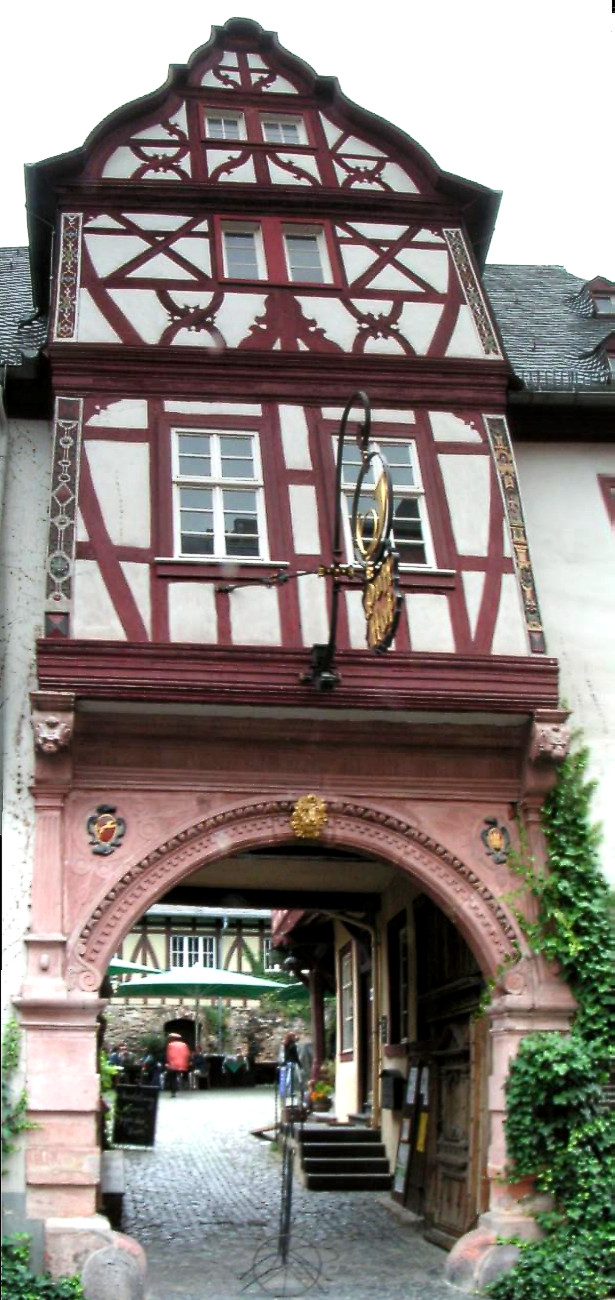
Old postal station

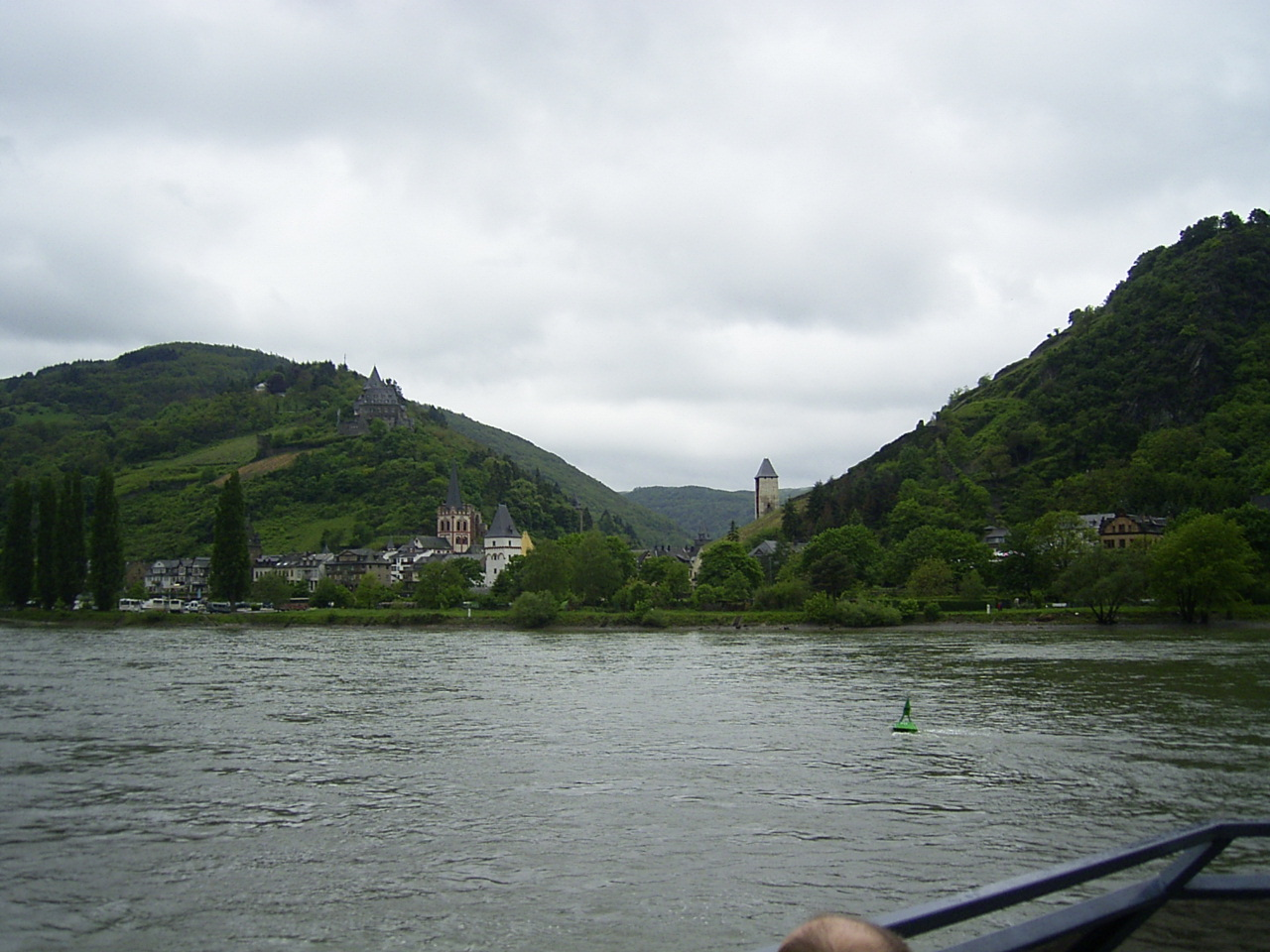
Bacharach with
Stahleck Castle

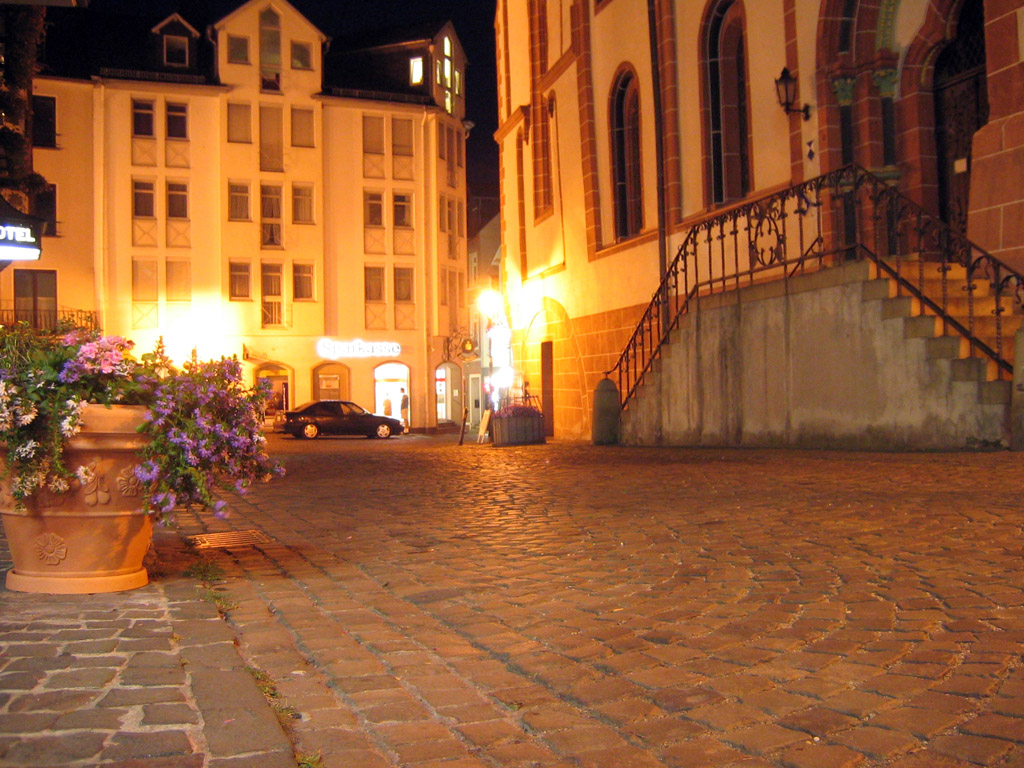
Downtown Bacharach

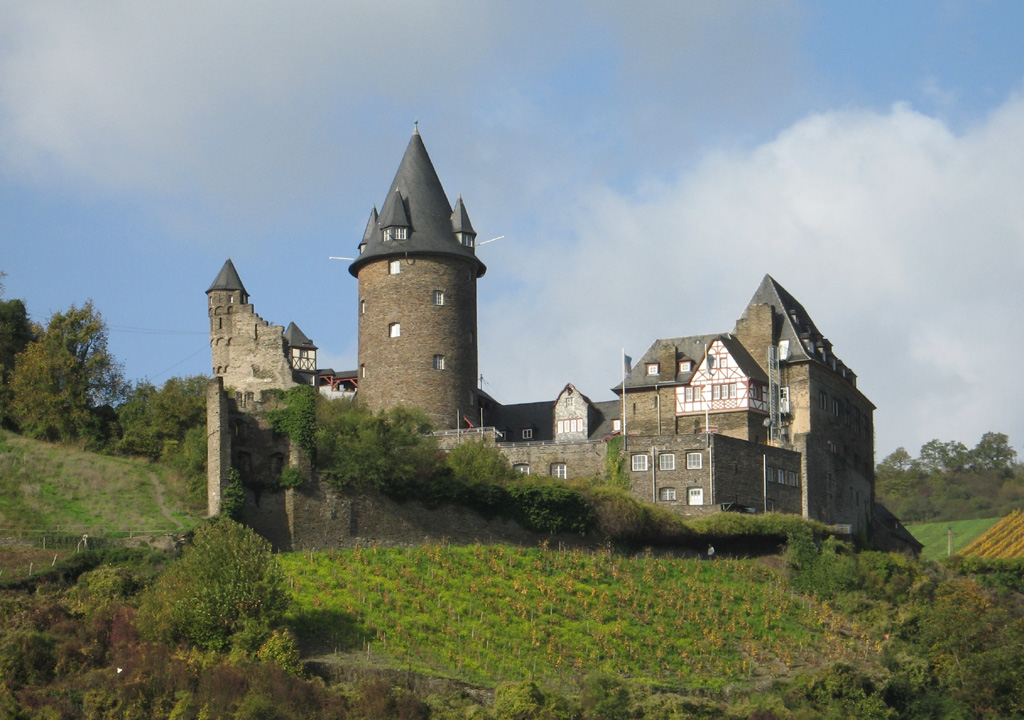
Stahleck Castle

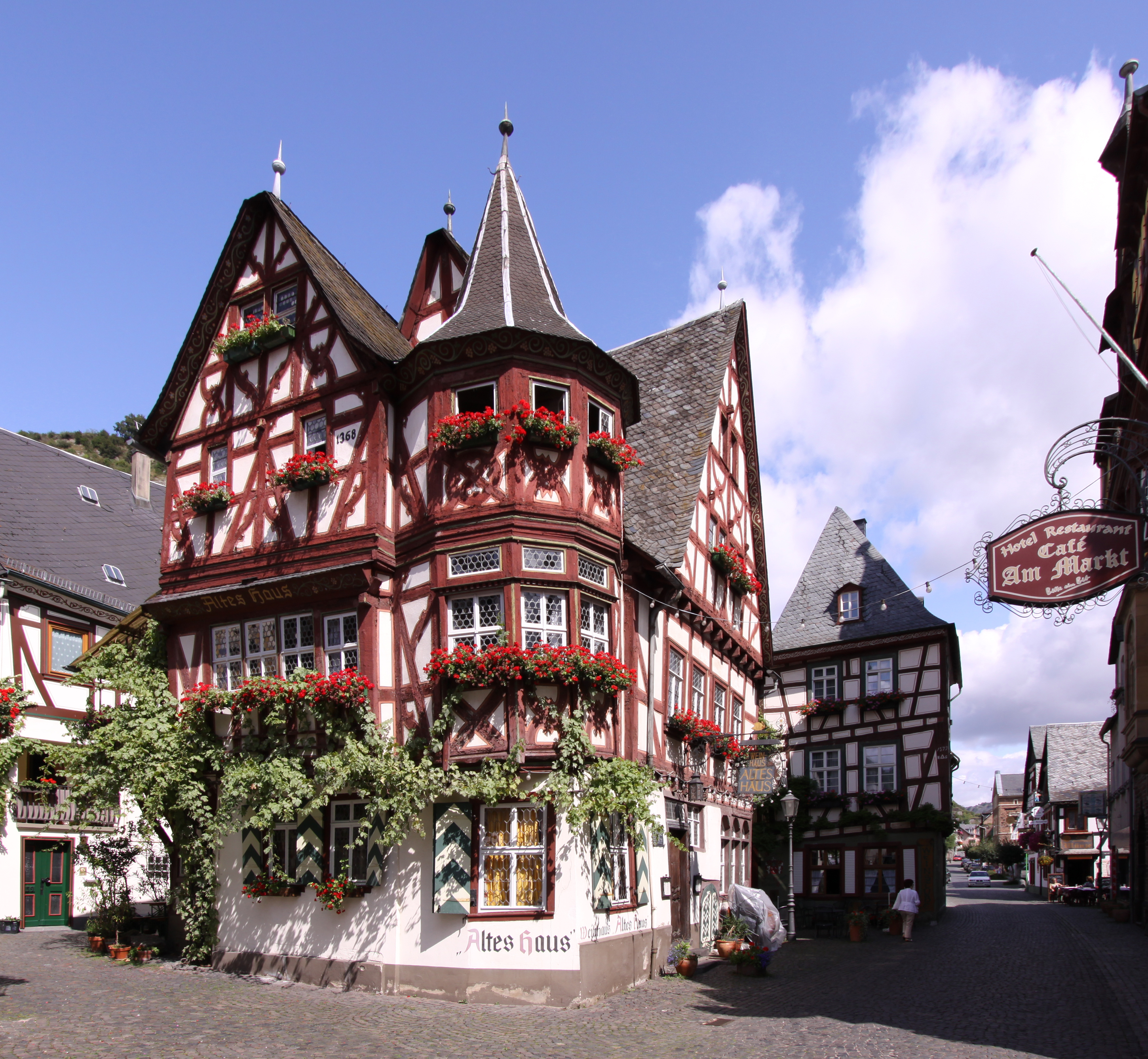
Altes Haus inn at the market

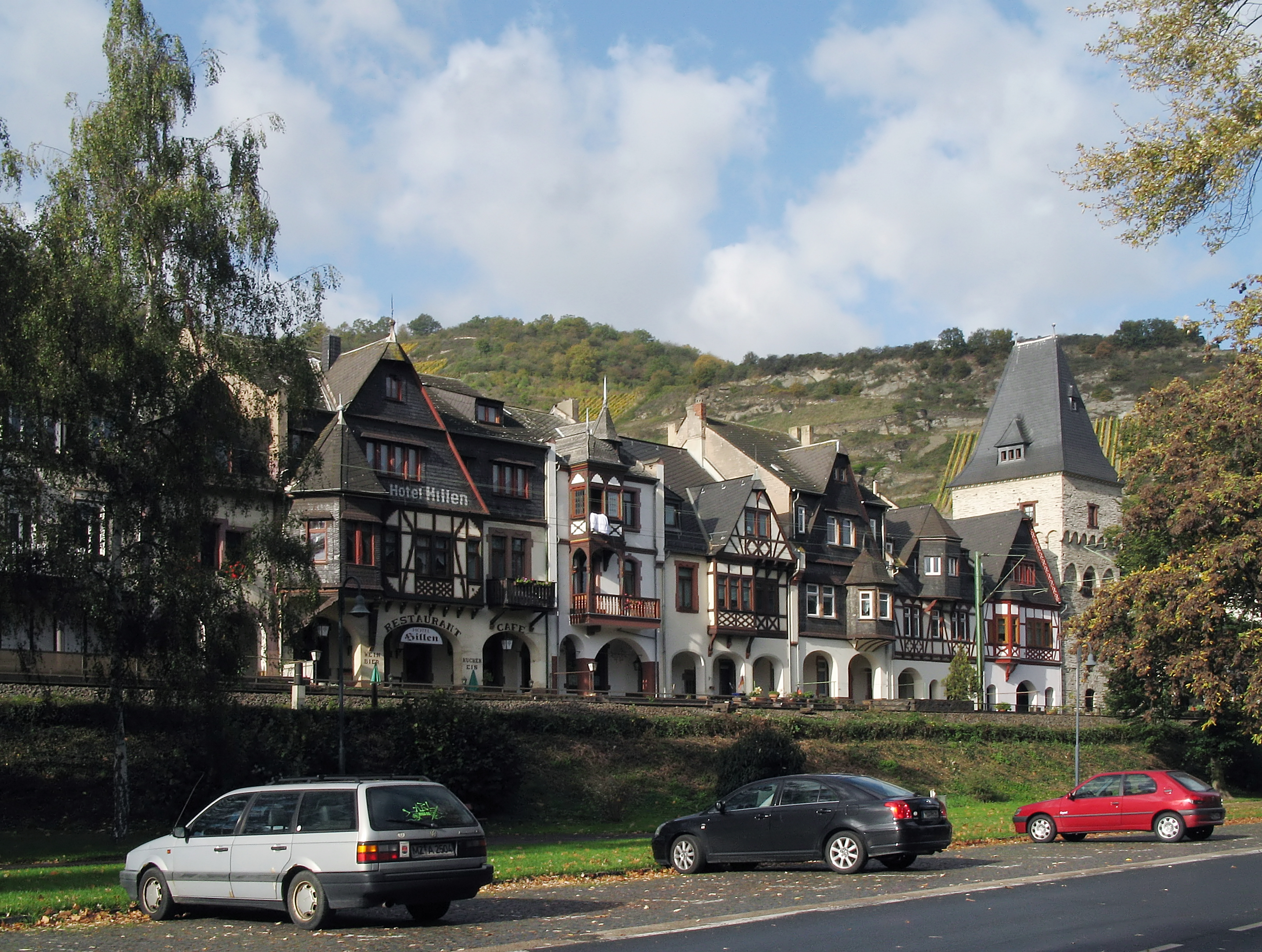
Rhine waterfront with town fortifications

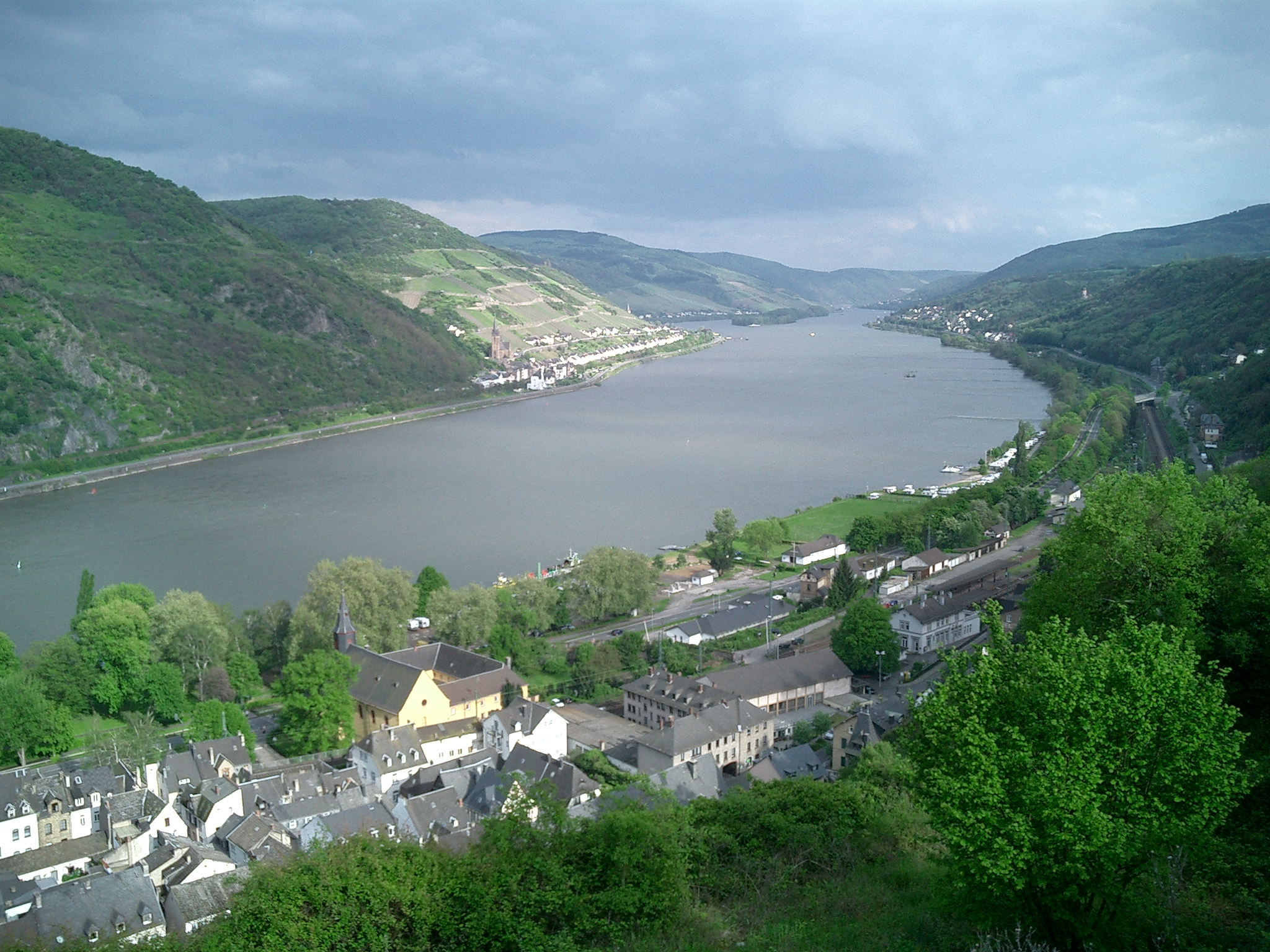
View of the Rhine

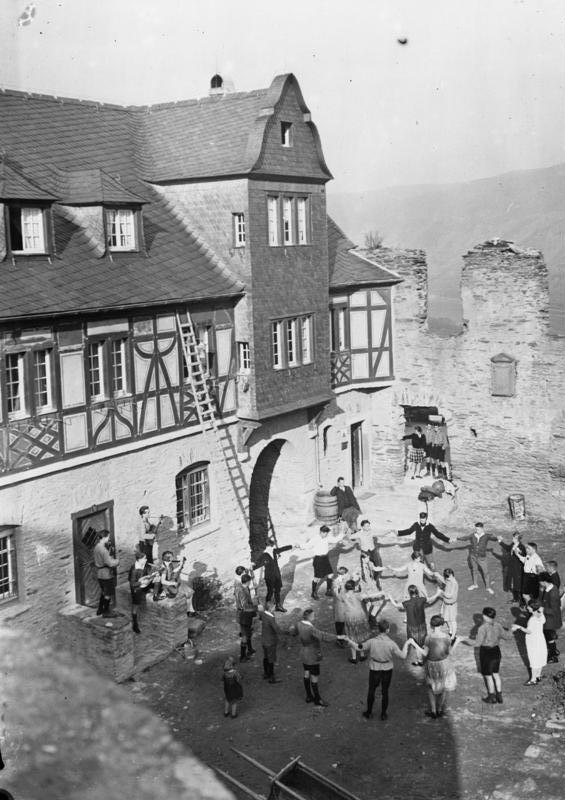
Stahleck Castle 1932

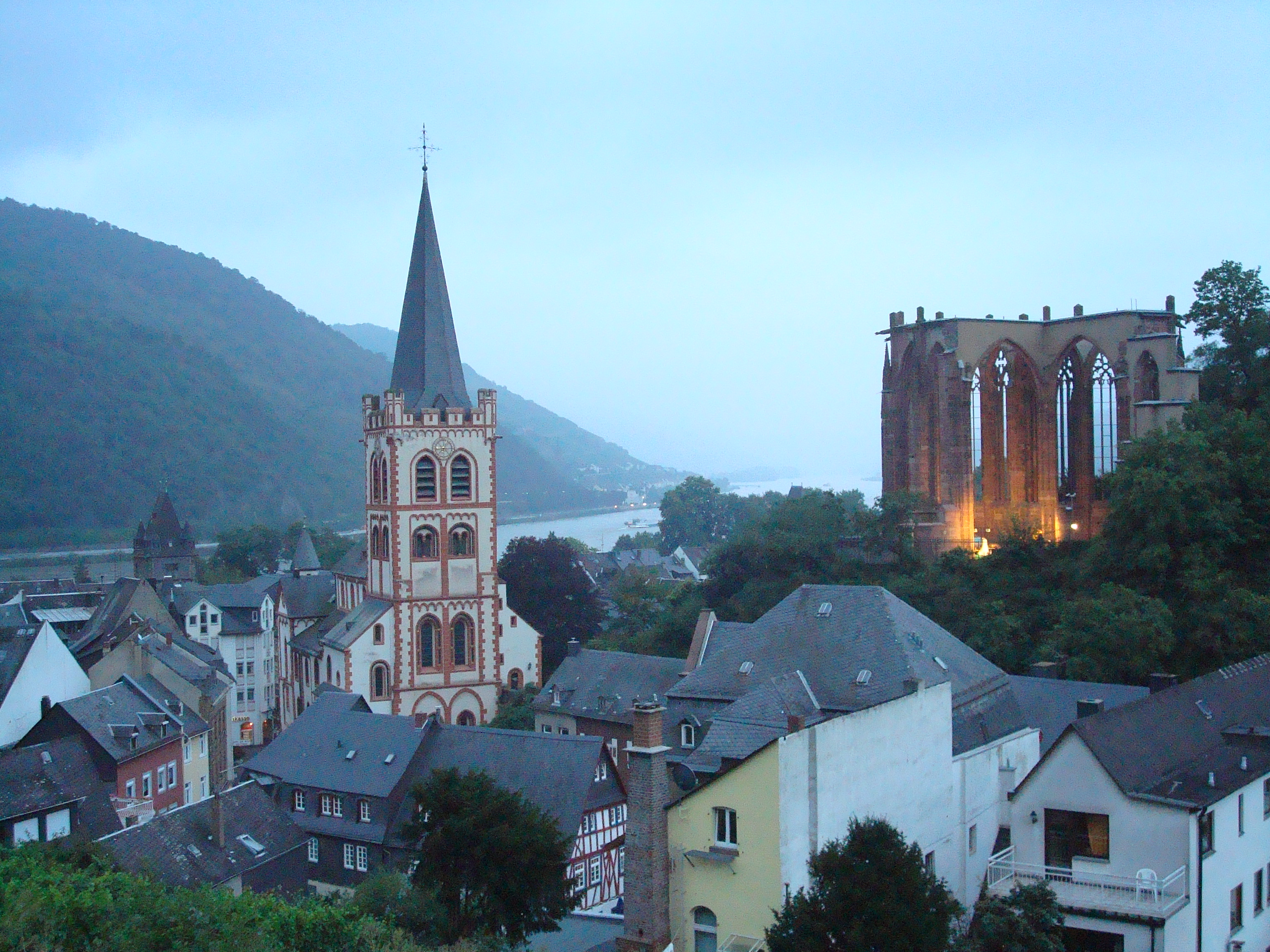

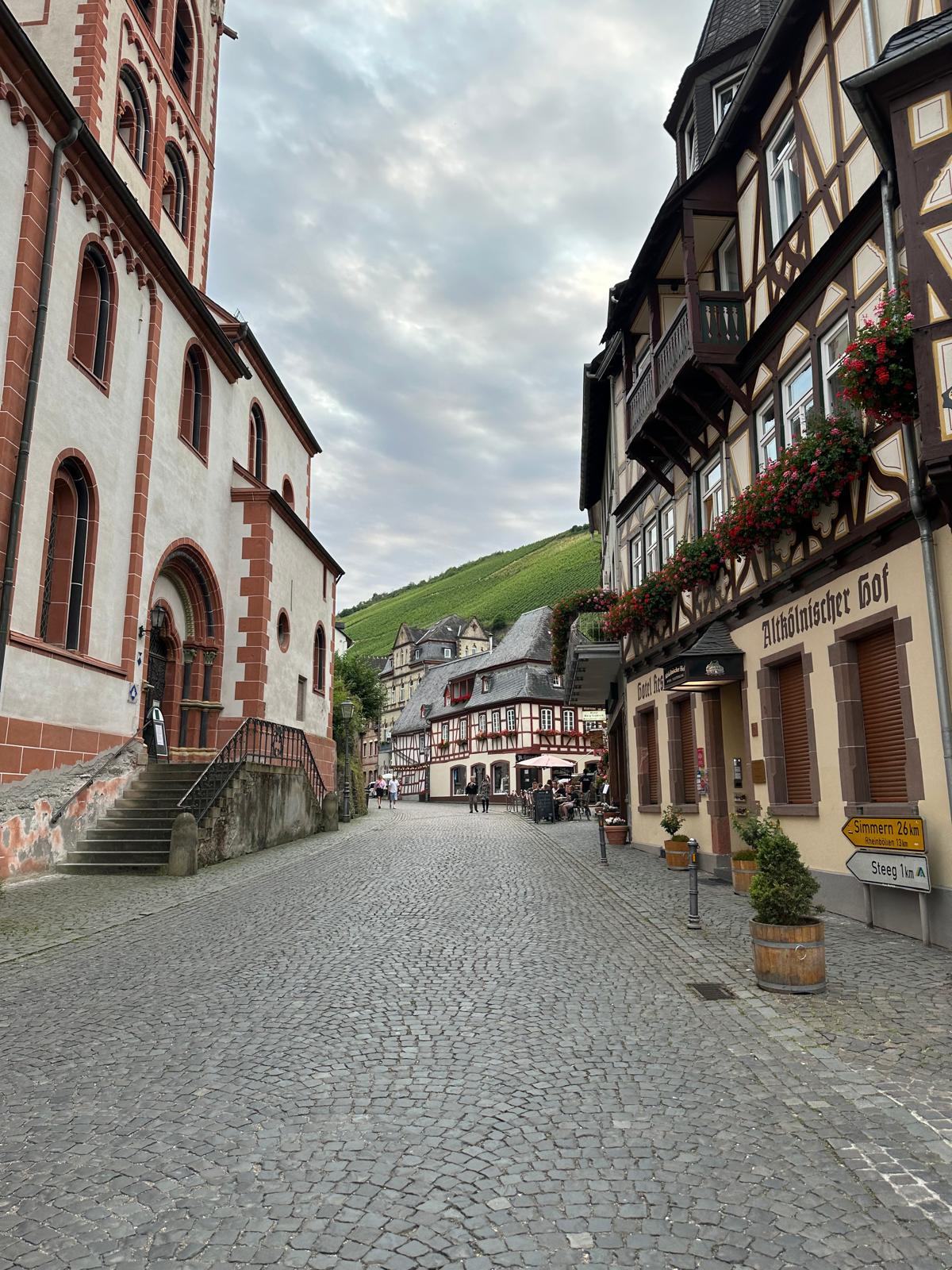
Bacharach street

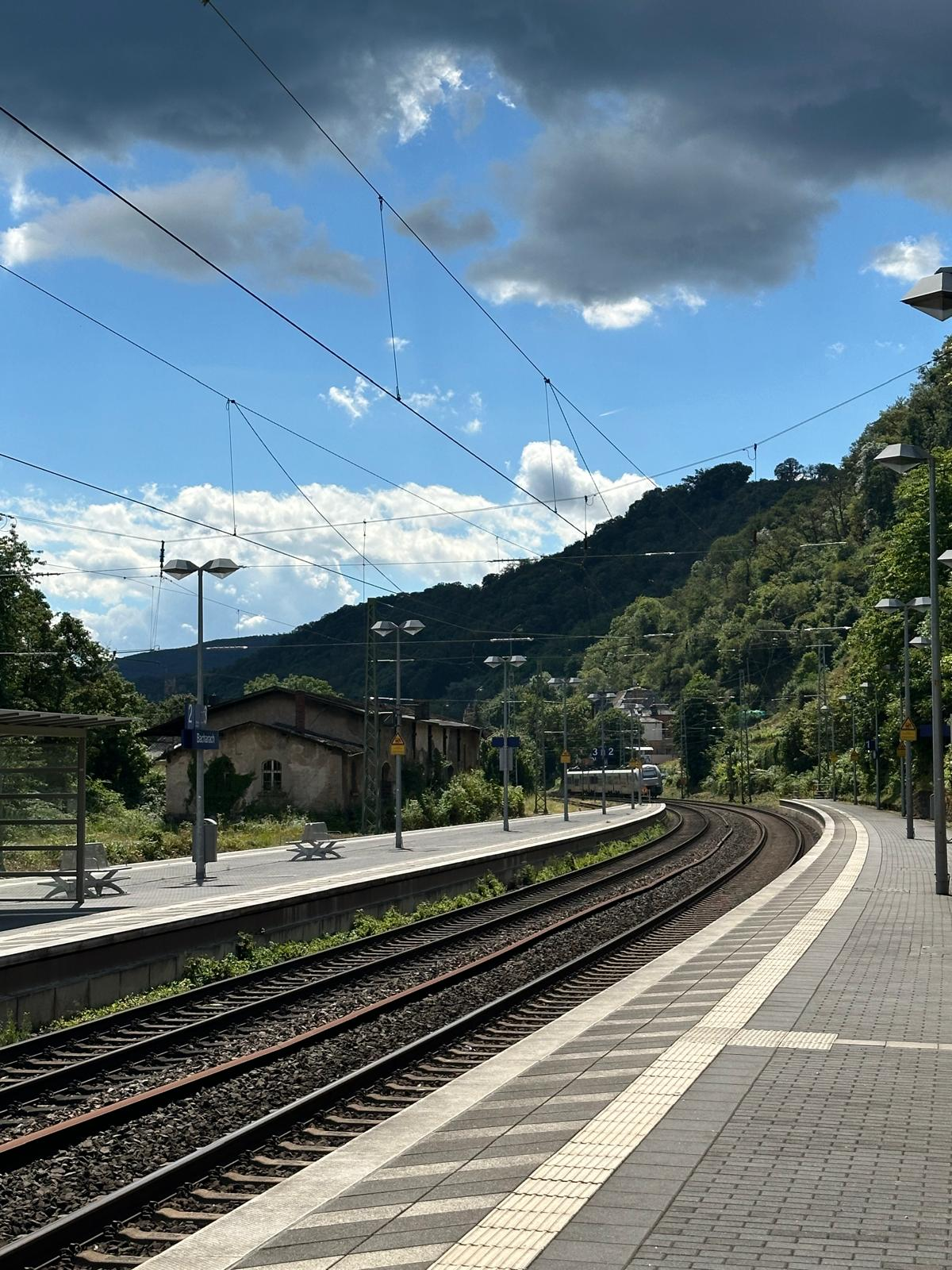
Bacharach train station
