= Konstantin von Kügelgen =

German artist (1810–1880)

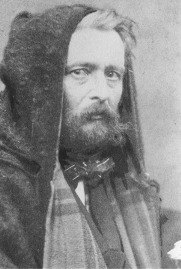
Konstantin von Kügelgen (date unknown)

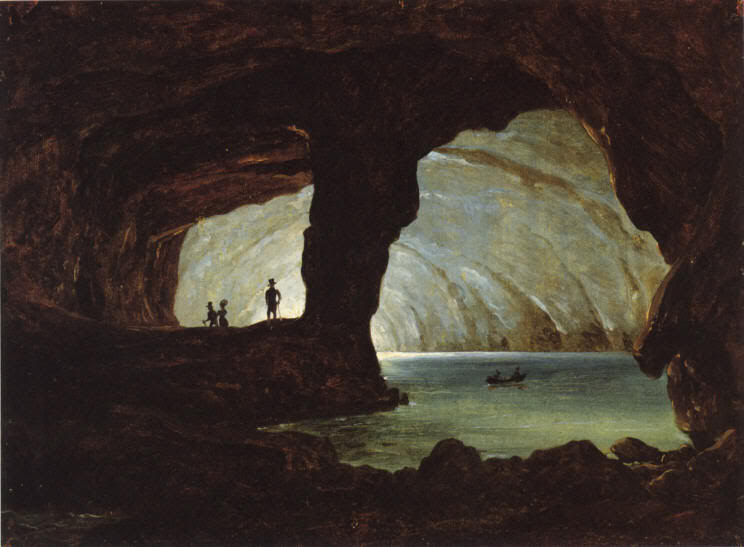
The Blue Grotto at Capri.

Konstantin von Kügelgen (also spelled Constantin von Kügelgen; 6 January 1810 — 28 April 1880) was a German landscape painter, the son of Karl von Kügelgen.

== Biography ==
His first art lessons were from his father, which he received together with his cousin, Carl Timoleon von Neff. In his youth he traveled to Italy. Later, he studied for two years in Munich, where he copied paintings from museums in the Kunstareal.

After the death of his first wife, Sally von Zezschwitz (1814–1839) he returned to the Baltics, where he worked as a drawing instructor. In 1840, he married his second wife, Alexandrine Zoege von Manteuffel (1820-1846), a distant relative of his mother. Two years after her premature death, he married into the prominent Maydell family.

He also wrote a memoir entitled Errinerungen aus meinem Leben (Memories from my Life), which was published posthumously in Saint Petersburg.

His daughter, Sally von Kügelgen, from his third marriage, also became an artist. Paul von Kügelgen, a son from his second marriage, was a journalist.

== Publications ==
- Kügelgen, Constantin von (1881). Erinnerungen aus meinem Leben, 1810–1880 (PDF) (in German). Saint Petersburg: Buchdruckerei der St. Petersburger Zeitung. OCLC 254101606.
