= Carl Timoleon von Neff =

Baltic German painter (1804–1877)

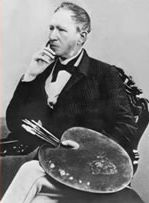
- Neff in the 1860s–1870s
- Born: 14 October 1804; Püssi, Governorate of Estonia, Russian Empire
- Died: 5 January 1877 (aged 72); Saint Petersburg, Russian Empire
- Resting place: St. Simon & St. Jude's Churchyard, Simuna, Estonia
- Education: Karl von Kügelgen; Ferdinand Hartmann
- Style: Academism
- Spouse(s): Louise Auguste Dorothea, Baroness von Kaulbars (m. 1838)
- Children: 2
- Elected: Member Academy of Arts (1839); Professor by rank (1849)
- Patrons: Tsar Nicholas I; Maria Nikolaevna, Duchess of Leuchtenberg; Duke Georg August of Mecklenburg-Strelitz

Neff, drawn by Carl Christian Vogel von Vogelstein, 1843; Kupferstich-Kabinett, Dresden

Carl Timoleon von Neff, also known in Russian sources from 1844 as Timofey Andreyevich Neff (Russian: Тимофей Андреевич Нефф, 14 October [O.S. 2 October] 1804 – 5 January [O.S. 24 December 1876] 1877), was a Russian artist of Baltic German descent.

== Biography ==
Carl Timoleon von Neff was born at a manor house in Neu-Isenhof (Püssi), Kreis Wierland in the Governorate of Estonia of the Russian Empire (present-day Estonia) in 1804. His mother was a French governess at the estate; he was an illegitimate child. He began studying art in Estonia under the tutelage of Karl von Kügelgen and continued at the Academy of Arts in Dresden, present-day Germany. He graduated from there in 1825. Following his graduation, he travelled and divided his time between his native Estonia, Italy and Saint Petersburg, the Imperial capital. In St. Petersburg he received a commission to paint the daughters of the emperor Nicholas I.

The portrait was apparently well received as he from this time onward became tied to the court, and made a career as an artist working for the higher echelons of society. He received prestigious commissions in both St. Petersburg and abroad. In recognition for his work, especially for contributing to the artistic embellishment of several churches, he was generously awarded with different forms of official recognition, such as orders and titles. In addition, he became one of the emperor's closest advisers in questions related to art. In 1846, he was made an honorary member of the Academy of Florence and after finishing the decoration of parts of the iconostasis of St. Isaac's Cathedral in St. Petersburg, was nominated to become a member of the Russian Imperial Academy of Arts. Following his many successes he built an Italianate manor house to house his personal art collection in Muuga, Estonia.

== Works ==
As a court artist, von Neff was appreciated as a portraitist and painter of typically academical subjects which were then popular, notably odalisque-like nude bathers and nymphs. As mentioned, he contributed to the artistic decoration of Saint Isaac's Cathedral, St. Petersburg, Cathedral of Christ the Saviour, Moscow, and Helsinki Cathedral, in present-day Finland, as well as churches outside the Russian empire - e.g. in Nice, France and Wiesbaden, present-day Germany. Several of his works are displayed in the Art Museum of Estonia today.

== Gallery ==
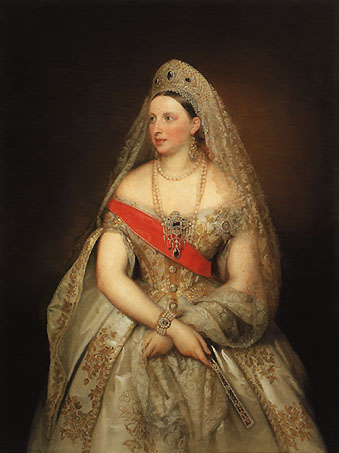
Portrait of Grand Duchess Alexandra Petrovna of Russia

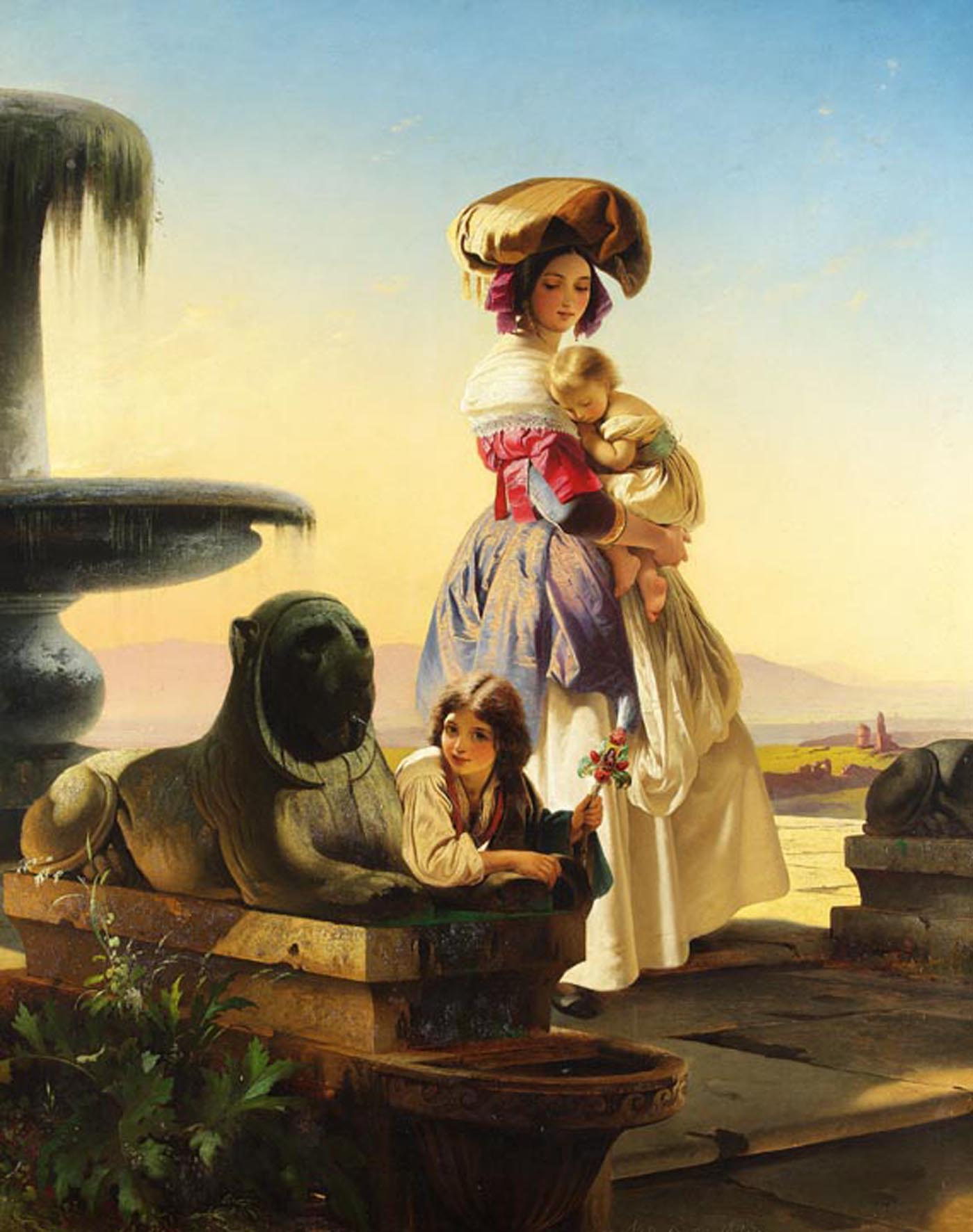
Young Mother

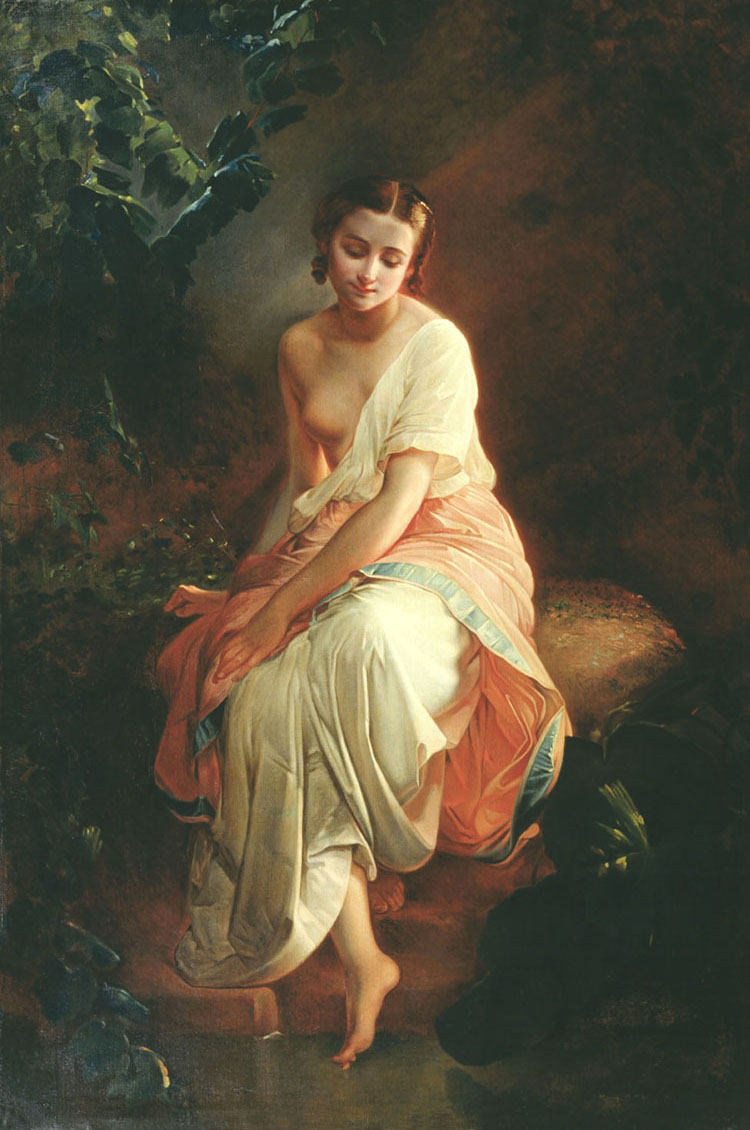
The Bather

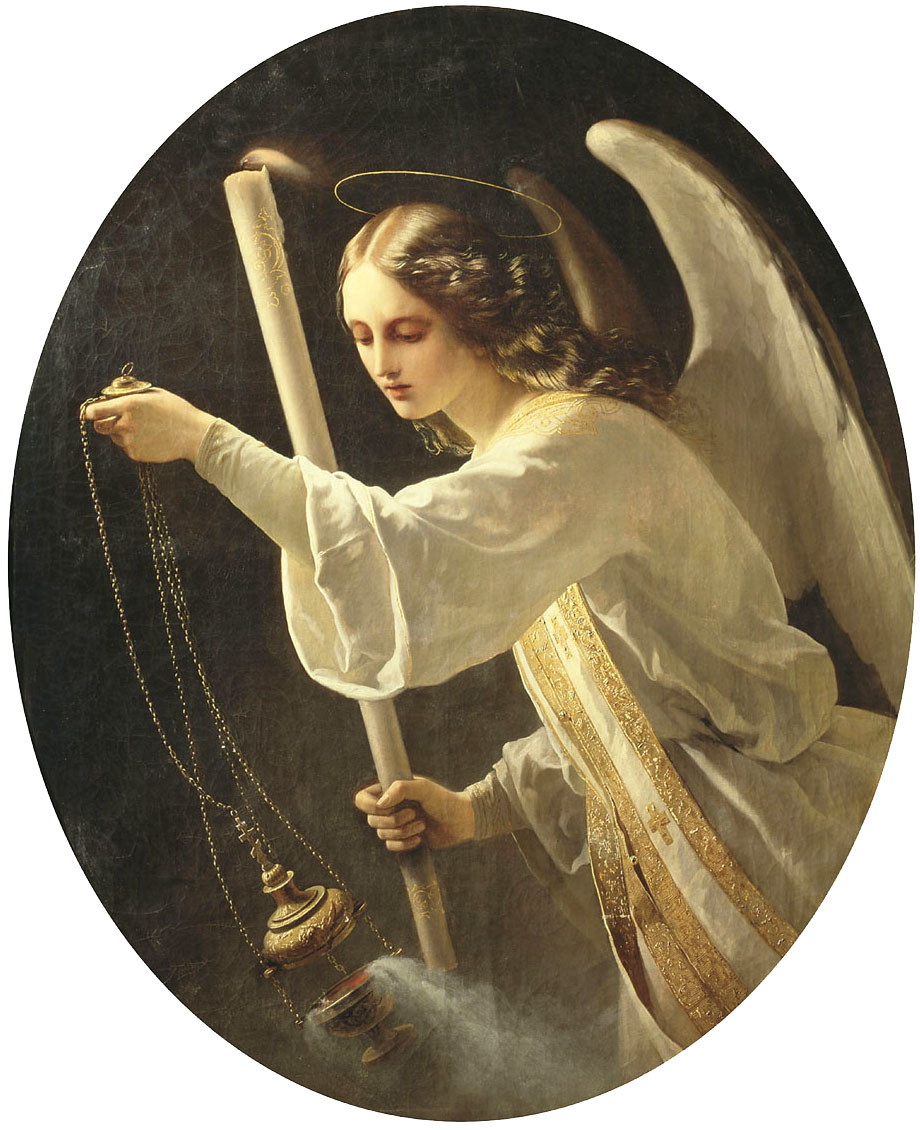
The Angel

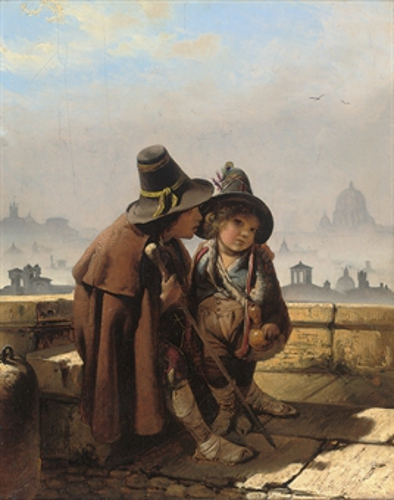
Italian street children

== See also ==
- Culture of Estonia
- List of Baltic German artists

== Sources ==
- "Нефф, Тимофей Андреевич" . Brockhaus and Efron Encyclopedic Dictionary (in Russian). 1906.
