= Karl von Kügelgen =

German painter (1772–1832)

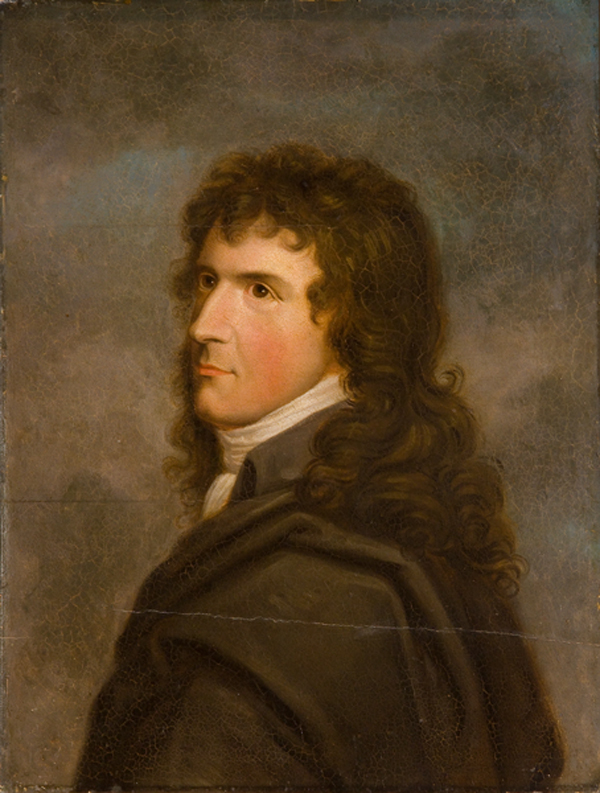
Portrait by his brother Gerhard (c. 1798)

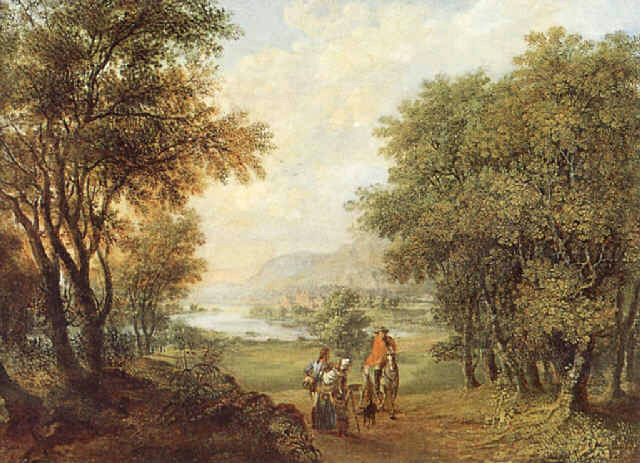
Wide, wooded, flooded landscape with rider and beggars. (German:Weite, bewaldete Flusslandschaft mit einem Reiter und Bettlern) Oil on canvas, 33 x 42 cm.

Johann Karl Ferdinand von Kügelgen (6 February 1772 – 9 January 1832 [O.S. 28 December 1831]) also known as Carl Ferdinand von Kügelgen, was a landscape and history painter, a Russian court and cabinet painter in St. Petersburg, a member of the Imperial Academy of Arts in St. Petersburg, and a member of the Prussian Academy of Arts in Berlin. He is the grandfather of Sally von Kügelgen.

== Life ==
He was born in Bacharach am Rhein. His twin brother, Gerhard von Kügelgen, was active as a portrait and history painter in Dresden. In his school days in Bonn, during which he lived with his brother, he studied at the first Bonn University of Philosophy. Ludwig van Beethoven was among his classmates.

In 1790 he traveled to Frankfurt and Würzburg, where he later worked in the studios of Johann Christoph Fesel. In 1791 he and his brother received a scholarship to Rome from the Elector of Bonn Archduke Maximilian Franz of Austria. In 1796, he travelled to Vienna with the composer Andreas Romberg and his cousin, Bernhard Romberg, then later moved to Riga.

In 1807, he married Emilie Zoege von Manteuffel (1788–1835), the sister of Gerhard's wife, Helene. His eldest son, Konstantin von Kügelgen, was also a landscape painter.

Kügelgen died in 1831 in Tallinn.

== Sources ==
- "Кюгельген, художники" . Brockhaus and Efron Encyclopedic Dictionary (in Russian). 1906.
