= Gerd-Helge Vogel =

German art historian (born 1951)

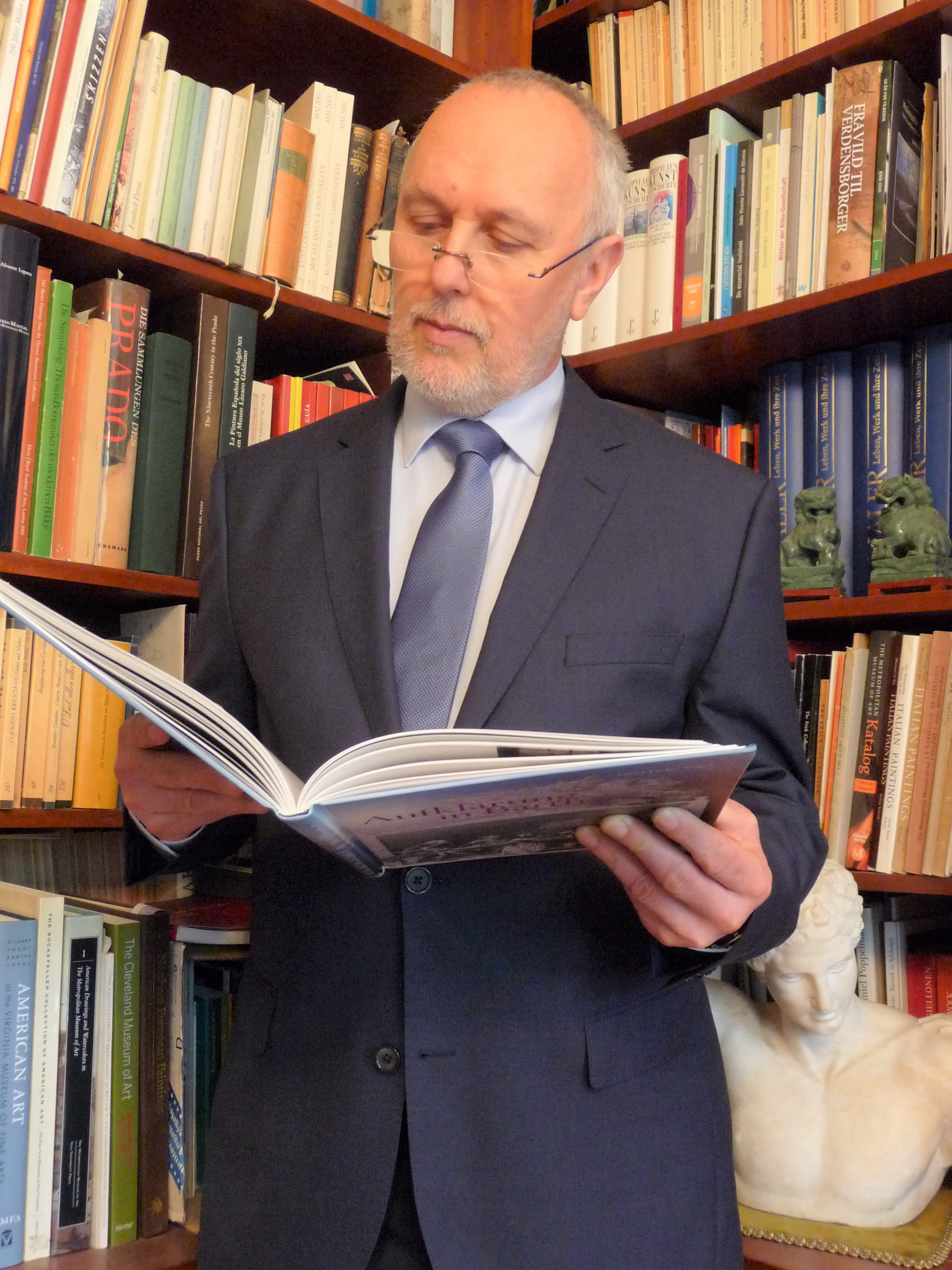
Gerd-Helge Vogel in 2016

Gerd-Helge Vogel (born 18 April 1951) is a German art historian.

== Life ==
Vogel was born in Zwickau, Saxony and grew up as the son of the dentist Helmut Vogel and his wife Lisa, née Leupold, in Hartenstein in the Ore Mountains. From 1966 to 1970 he visited the Extended Secondary School (EOS) in Aue in Saxony, where he simultaneously completed vocational training as a lathe operator in the Blema company. After the Abitur in 1970, even before taking up his studies of Art history and Niederlandistik at the Humboldt-Universität zu Berlin, he did (HUB) will complete eighteen months of basic military service as part of compulsory military service. In 1976 he completed his studies with the professors Peter H. Feist and Harald Olbrich with the diploma.

== Professional activity ==
Vogel started his career as a research assistant at the Centre for Art Exhibitions of the GDR-Neue Berliner Galerie (ZfK) in the Altes Museum in Berlin, where he co-curated about 35 international art exhibitions, which were realized in Berlin and other cities of the GDR within the framework of cultural agreements of the GDR with other states. They provided him with practical experience in the exhibition business and gave him insight into a diverse spectrum of artistic work from antiquity. (e.g. gold treasure of the Thracians) up to the international contemporary art (e.g. Denmark). He was confronted with almost all art genres and art epochs, which ensured his openness and interest in art phenomena of all kinds. At the same time he gave guest lectures on Old Dutch painting at the HUB, so as not to lose the connection to research and teaching during his practical work in the exhibition field.

From 1979 to 1982 Vogel graduated from the Ernst-Moritz-Arndt-University Greifswald (EMAU) a Aspirantur, which he completed with a doctorate to pursue a university career at this university. Through the research focus on the "Art of Romanticism" set here by his doctoral mother Hannelore Gärtner, Vogel was involved in this specialisation from his time as an assistant. He took part in the III to VI International Greifswald Romanticism Conference with corresponding research topics. A research stay at the Vrije Universiteit (Amsterdam) with Professor Ilja Veldman offered him the prerequisites for his habilitation. (1989) "The dream of Batavian Arcadia. Studies on the theory and practice of historicism in Dutch painting around 1800".

After the German reunification Vogel achieved the status of Privatdozent. Since 1994 he has revived the tradition of the "International Greifswald Romantic Conferences" to further research the history of art at the University of Greifswald and thus organized the VI. to XII. Romanticism Conference, for which he also edited the scientific conference volumes. Gradually he was able to establish an extensive network of international research, with which he realised various publication projects at home and abroad. Among his friends are the professors Konstanty Kalinowski (Poznań), Minoru Saito (Hiroshima), Juhan Maiste (Tallinn, Tartu), Gao Jianping (Beijing), Zdravko Radman (Zagreb), Joao Vicente Ganzarolli de Olivera (Rio de Janeiro), Wanghen Chen (Wuhan), Shenbing Zhang (Tsingtau), Jale Nejdet Erzen (Ankara) and the doctors Dariusz Kacprzak (Szczecin), Thorkild Kjærgaard (Nuuk). This led him to many international congresses in France, Japan, China, Brazil, Finland, Czech Republic, Latvia, Turkey and Great Britain. A six-week travel grant from the Kachima Foundation to Japan also enabled him to conduct comparative research on garden design, which has resulted in numerous publications.

After the expiry of his temporary contract with EMAU, Vogel went to the Estonian Academy of Arts in 1999 and 2001 as Guest Professor for one semester at a time to Tallinn. In the meantime, he has organised various art exhibitions with the museums in Zwickau, Jena, Greifswald, Güstrow, Cottbus, Poznań, etc. During research stays in the Strang Print Room of the "University College" in London, in the Witt Library of the Courtauld Institute of Art, in the Department for Illuminated Manuscripts at the British Library and in the Natural History Museum. In London he extended and deepened his international scientific experience.

In 2005 he was offered the Department Design at the Zurich University of the Arts (ZHdK) to develop an independent course in the theory and history of scientific illustration for the course Scientific Visualization, which he ran until his retirement in 2016. At the same time he has since then been active in Germany as a freelance art historian and works as curator of exhibitions, as organizer of the Zurich Symposia on Scientific Illustration and the International Schloss Wolkenburg Symposia on Art as well as a publicist of numerous publications on art history.

== Main areas of research ==
Vogel concentrated his extensive research activities in particular on the following areas:

- Art of the Enlightenment and Romanticism in Europe
- Garden art
- Regional art history of Saxony, Pomerania and Estonia
- Poster art
- History and aesthetics of scientific illustration
- Phenomena of international cultural exchange (especially with the Far and Middle East)
- Dutch painting.

These research foci are reflected in nearly 40 book publications as well as in about 200 specialist publications.

== Publications ==
- Otto Carl Friedrich von Schönburgs Park 'Greenfield' zu Waldenburg. Ein Beispiel für die Nachfolge und Weiterentwicklung der landschaftsgärtnerischen Absichten des Dessau-Wörlitzer Gartenreiches. In Friedrich Wilhelm von Erdmannsdorff 1736–1800. Leben, Werk, Wirkung. Staatliche Schlösser und Gärten Wörlitz, Oranienbaum, Luisium. Wörlitz 1987.
- Christian Leberecht Vogel. Verlag der Kunst, Dresden 1988 (series: Maler und Werk).
- Adriaen van Ostade. Kunstmappe. E.A. Seemann Verlag, Leipzig 1989.
- Malerei und Zeichnungen der Brüder Gerhard von Kügelgen (1772–1820) und Karl von Kügelgen (1772–1832) aus den Sammlungen der Museen in Tallinn, Tartu und Leningrad. Katalog des Zentrums für Kunstausstellungen der DDR. Neue Berliner Galerie, Berlin 1989.
- Rügen im Erlebnis der deutschen Malerei und Zeichenkunst von der Romantik bis 1850. In Gerd-Helge Vogel, Bernfried Lichtnau (ed.): Rügen als Künstlerinsel von der Romantik bis zur Gegenwart. Verlag Atelier im Bauernhaus & Galerie-Verlag, Fischerhude 1993 (ROMANTIK-edition 2).
- Die Bedeutung Ludwig Gotthard Kosegartens für die Herausbildung des frühromantischen Weltbildes bei Caspar David Friedrich. in Wilhelm Kühlmann, Horst Langer (ed.): Pommern in der frühen Neuzeit. Literatur und Kultur in Stadt und Region. Max Niemeyer Verlag, Tübingen 1994.
- Klassizismus, Romantik, Realismus. Malerei und Graphik aus sächsischen Kunstsammlungen. Greifswald 20.6.1995-20.8.1995 Städtisches Museum Zwickau (ed.): Seyffert Verlag, Altenburg 1994.
- Konfuzianismus und chinoise Architekturen im Zeitalter der Aufklärung. In Die Gartenkunst 8/1996/2. Wernersche Verlagsgesellschaft, Worms 1996.
- Der Traum vom irdischen Paradies in der Landschaftskunst des Jacob Philipp Hackert. In: Gerd-Helge Vogel, Rolf H. Seiler (ed.): Der Traum vom irdischen Paradies. Die Landschaftskunst des Jakob Philipp Hackert. Verlag Atelier im Bauernhaus & Galerie-Verlag, Fischerhude 1996 (ROMANTIK-edition vol.. 3).
- Kunst und Kultur um 1800 im Zwickauer Muldenland. Städtisches Museum Zwickau, Zwickau 1996.
- Die hohe Zeit der Plakatkunst in Deutschland 1900–1914. In Städtisches Museum Zwickau (ed.): Die hohe Zeit der Plakatkunst in Deutschland. Ausstellungskatalog. Zwickau 1997.
- Bildhafte Sprache und sprechende Bilder: Anmerkungen zum Einfluss der Werke Goethes auf Bildfindungen der Dresdener Romantiker. In Germanisches Nationalmuseum Nürnberg (ed.): Anzeiger des Germanischen Nationalmuseums, Nürnberg 1999.
- Zwischen erzgebirgischem Musenhof, russischem Zarensitz und deutschrömischer Künstlerrepublik. Carl Christian Vogel (von Vogelstein) und seine Beziehungen nach Russland. In Germanisches Nationalmuseum Nürnberg (ed.): Anzeiger des Germanischen Nationalmuseums, Nürnberg 2001.
- Out into Nature – Caspar David Friedrich and the Early Plein-air Sketch in Germany. In: Katrin Bellinger at Colnaghi (ed.): Out into Nature. The Dawn of Plein-Air Painting in Germany 1820–1850. London 2003.
- Wunderland Cathay. Chinoise Architekturen in Europa – Teil 1–4. In Die Gartenkunst 16/2004, pp. 125–172; pp. 339–382 and 17/2005, pp. 168–216; pp. 387–430.
- Mobility: The Fourth Dimension in the Fine Arts and Architecture. In Contemporary Aesthetics. Special Volume 1 (2005). Contemporary Aesthetics is an international interdisciplinary, online journal of contemporary theory, research and applications in aesthetics. (15 pages). In Ossi Naukarinen (ed.): Aesthetics and Mobility. Proceedings of the Conference at University of Art and Design Helsinki, Helsinki 2005].
- The Pagoda: A Typical East-Asian Architectural Structure and its Adaptation within European Garden Structures in 18th and 19th Century. In Gao Jianping, Wang Keping (ed.): Aesthetics and Culture. East and West. Anhui Educational Publishing House, Beijing 2006, pp. 162–207 (In English and Chinese).
- Patriotische Gesinnung und antinapoleonische Haltung im Werk von Caspar David Friedrich. In Anzeiger des Germanischen Nationalmuseums 2006.
- Christian Leberecht Vogel (1759–1816). Ein sächsischer Maler aus dem Zeitalter der Empfindsamkeit. In Gerd-Helge Vogel, Hermann Vogel von Vogelstein: Christian Leberecht Vogel. Gutenberg Verlag, Leipzig 2006.
- Moritz Retzsch's Annäherung an Goethe im poetischen Motiv der „exempla amoris“. In Anzeiger des Germanischen Nationalmuseums 2008. Verlag des Germanischen Nationalmuseums, Nürnberg 2008.
- Im Zeichen der Tulpe: Zur Rezeption abendländischer Kunst und Kultur im Osmanischen Reich. In Jale Nejdet Erzen (ed.): XVIIth International Congress of Aesthetics, July 9–13, 2007, Middle East Technical University, Ankara Turkey, Congress Book II, Selected Papers. SANART Ankara 2009.
- Zwischen Eldorado und Gelobtem Land. Deutsche Künstler der Romantik als Forscher und Exulanten in der Neuen Welt. In Gerd-Helge Vogel (ed.): Die Welt im Großen und im Kleinen. Kunst und Wissenschaft im Umkreis von Alexander von Humboldt und August Most. Festschrift zum 100. Geburtstag des Caspar-David-Friedrich-Institut der Ernst-Moritz-Arndt Universität Greifswald. Protokollband der XI. und XII. Greifswalder Romantikkonferenz und des 1. Zürcher Symposiums zur wissenschaftlichen Illustration. Lukas Verlag, Berlin 2009.
- Christian Leberecht Vogel – Leben und Werk. In Kunstsammlungen der Städtischen Museen Zwickau. Staatliche Schlösser, Burgen und Gärten Sachsen / Schlösser und Gärten Dresden / Schloss Pillnitz (ed.): Christian Leberecht Vogel. Ein sächsischer Meister der Empfindsamkeit. Zum 250. Geburtstag. Zwickau, Dresden 2009.
- Die Anfänge chinoiser Architekturen in Deutschland: Prototypen und ihr soziokultureller Hintergrund. In Dirk Welich (ed.): China in Schloss und Garten. Chinoise Architekturen und Innenräume. Sandstein Verlag, Dresden und Staatliche Schlösser, Burgen und Gärten, Sachsen 2010.
- Die Göttlichkeit des Lichts. Fritz von Uhde (1848–1911) zum 100. Todestag. Ausstellungskatalog zu Leben, Werk und kulturellem Umfeld. Städtische Museen Zwickau, Kunstsammlungen; Städtische Museen Limbach-Oberfrohna, Schloss Wolkenburg 2011.
- … zeigt viel Anlage zur Mahlerei. Johann Gustav Grunewald. Ein Schüler des Romantikers Caspar David Friedrich. Thomas Helms Verlag, Schwerin 2011.
- Auf der Suche nach dem Licht. Der Maler des göttlichen Lichts, Fritz von Uhde, trifft auf Louis Douzette, den pommerschen Magier der Nacht. Thomas Helms Verlag, Schwerin 2012.
- Rudolf Nehmer (1912–1983). Zum 100. Geburtstag des Künstlers. Lukas Verlag, Berlin 2013.
- Fritz von Uhde 1848–1911. Das Werden eines Künstlers aus dem Zwickauer Muldenland. In: Gerd-Helge Vogel (ed.): Fritz von Uhde 1848–1911. Beiträge des 1. Internationalen Wolkenburger Symposiums zur Kunst. Lukas Verlag, Berlin 2013.
- »Ich werde Ihnen meinen Stüler schicken, da sind Sie in guten Händen«. Bestand & Wandel im Erscheinungsbild der Barther Marienkirche. 150 Jahre Stülersche Fassung der spätromantischen Restaurierung. Verlag Ludwig, Kiel 2013.
- Chinoise Architekturen in deutschen Gärten. Ein kleines Lexikon. Pückler-Gesellschaft, Berlin und Verlag und Datenbank für Geisteswissenschaften, Weimar 2014.
- Von Stein bis Schloss Wolkenburg. "Mahlerische Reisen" durchs Zwickauer Muldenland – Burgen, Schlösser und Rittergüter in alten Ansichten. Lukas Verlag, Berlin 2014.
- Aufklärung in Barth. Zur 250. Wiederkehr des helvetisch-deutschen Dialogs zwischen Johann Joachim Spalding, Johann Caspar Lavater, Johann Heinrich Füssli und Felix Heß in Barth in den Jahren 1763/64. Verlag Ludwig, Kiel 2014.
- Wie kamen die Pflanzen in die Malerei? Zur botanischen Darstellung in der europäischen Malerei zwischen Spätgotik und Biedermeier. In Gerd-Helge Vogel (ed.): Pflanzen, Blüten, Früchte. Botanische Illustrationen in Kunst und Wissenschaft. Lukas Verlag für Kunst und Geistesgeschichte, Berlin 2014.
- Zwischen Repräsentation und Memoria. Zur Porträtplastik von Joseph Mattersberger und seiner Zeit. In Gerd-Helge Vogel (ed.): Joseph Mattersberger. Ein klassizistischer Bildhauer im Dienste der Grafen von Einsiedel und der sächsische Eisenkunstguss um 1800. Lukas Verlag für Kunst und Geistesgeschichte, Berlin 2015.
- August Matthias Hagen (1794–1878) – Deutschbaltische Landschaftsmalerei zwischen romantischen Aufbruch und provinzieller Selbstgenügsamkeit. In Baltic Journal of Art History, Official Publication of the Chair of Art History of the University of Tartu, Autumn 2015, Spring 2016, Tartu / Finland 2015.
- Vom Pommerschen Krummstiel nach Sanssouci. Ferdinand Jühlke (1815–1893). Ein Leben für den Garten(bau). Verlag Ludwig, Kiel 2016.
- Chinoise Architekturen, das antiklassische Element im Landschaftsgarten: Zu Funktion, Form und Farbe ostasiatischer Bauformen im Kontext von William Chambers „A Dissertation on Oriental Gardening“. In Peter Arlt (ed.): Künstler, Kunstwerk und Gesellschaft – Gedenkveranstaltung für Peter H. Feist, 8. Dezember 2016. Sitzungsberichte Leibniz-Sozietät der Wissenschaften zu Berlin, volume 132, Jahrgang 2017. trafo Wissenschaftsverlag Dr. Wolfgang Weist, Berlin 2017, ISBN 978-3-86464-155-8.
- Adam Friedrich Oeser. Götterhimmel und Idylle. Zum 300. Geburtstag des Künstlers. Lukas Verlag, Berlin 2017.
- Der Landschaftsmaler und Porträtist Oscar Achenbach, 1868–1935. Edited by Gerd Albrecht im Auftrag des Vineta-Museums der Stadt Barth. Lukas Verlag, Berlin 2018, pp. 8–96, ISBN 978-3-86732-321-5.
- Johann Böhm und seine Auftraggeber. In Gerd-Helge Vogel (Hrsg.): SOLI DEO GLORIA. Johann Böhm (1595-1667) und die westsächsische Bildhauerkunst zwischen Manierismus und Barock. Lukas Verlag, Berlin 2018, pp. 55–85, ISBN 978-3-86732-268-3.
- Architecture for Teaching, Learning and Research: Academic Architecture at German Universities in the European Context from the Middle Ages to the Enlightenment. In: Kadri Asmer, Juhan Maiste (ed.): In Search of the University Landscape. The Age of the Enlightenment. University of Tartu 2018, pp. 95–120.
- Die Entstehung des ersten deutschen Seebades Doberan-Heiligendamm unter dem Baumeister Carl Theodor Severin (1763-1836). Donatus Verlag, Niederjahna 2018, 196 pages. ISBN 978-3-946710-17-2.
- as editor: Adam Friedrich Oeser 1717-1799. Beiträge des 3. Internationalen Wolkenburger Symposiums zur Kunst vom 23. bis zum 25. Juni 2017 auf Schloss Wolkenburg. Lukas Verlag, Berlin 2019, ISBN 978-3-86732-332-1.
- Von Abtnaundorf bis Wolkenburg. Adam Friedrich Oeser und die Kunst des anglo-chinoisen Gartens der Empfindsamkeit. In Gerd-Helge Vogel (ed.): Adam Friedrich Oeser 1717-1799. Beiträge des 3. Internationalen Wolkenburger Symposiums zur Kunst vom 23. bis zum 25. Juni 2017 auf Schloss Wolkenburg. Lukas Verlag, Berlin 2019, pp. 39–114, ISBN 978-3-86732-332-1.

== Literature ==
- Kevin E. Kandt, Hermann Vogel von Vogelstein (ed.): Aus Hippocrenes Quelle. Ein Album amicorum kunsthistorischer Beiträge zum 60. Geburtstag von Gerd-Helge Vogel. Lukas Verlag, Berlin 2011.
- Klaus Haese: Gerd-Helge Vogel zum 60. Geburtstag. In Sächsische Heimatblätter. 57/2011/4, p. 404.
- Kevin E. Kandt, Michael Lissok (ed.): Festgaben aus Floras Füllhorn, Pomonas Gärten und vom Helikon. Eine Blütenlese kultur- und kunsthistorischer Beiträge zum 65. Geburtstag von Gerd-Helge Vogel. Verlag Ludwig, Kiel 2016.
- Ulrike Krenzlin: Vom Bürger, der sich im Sozialismus verliert. Betrachtungen zur "Rückschau eines Kunsthistorikers". In Peter Arlt (ed.): Künstler, Kunstwerk und Gesellschaft – Gedenkveranstaltung für Peter H. Feist, 8 December 2016. Sitzungsberichte Leibniz-Sozietät der Wissenschaften zu Berlin, volume 132, year 2017, pp. 35–45, here p. 44.
