= Ardices (artist) =

Ancient Greek artist

Ardices of Corinth was (along with a "Telephanes of Sicyon") according to Pliny the Elder the first artist who practiced the form of "monogram", or drawing in outline with an indication also of the parts within the external outline, but without color, as in the designs of the artists John Flaxman and Moritz Retzsch.

Pliny, after stating that the invention of the earliest form of drawing, namely, the external outline, as marked by the edge of the shadow (umbra hominis lineis circumducta, or pictura linearis), was claimed by the ancient Egyptians, the Corinthians, and the Sicyonians, adds that it was said to have been invented by Philocles, an Egyptian, or by Cleanthes, a Corinthian, and that the next step was made by Ardices and Telephanes, who first added the inner lines of the figure (spargentes lineas intus).
