= Reception of the American Loyalists by Great Britain in the Year 1783 =

Painting by Benjamin West

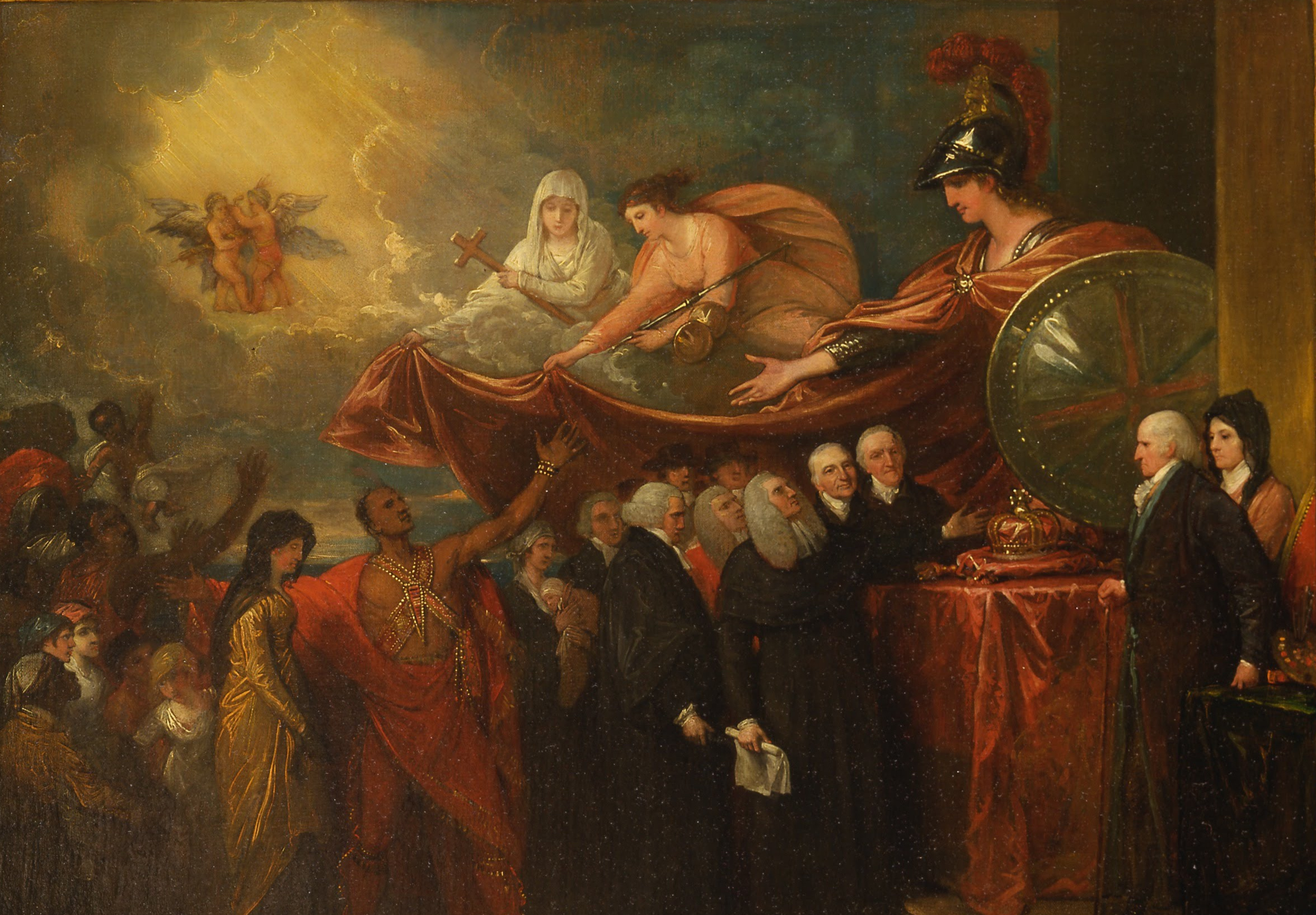
Reception of the American Loyalists by Great Britain in the Year 1783 by Benjamin West, depicting Britannia taking in exiled Loyalists

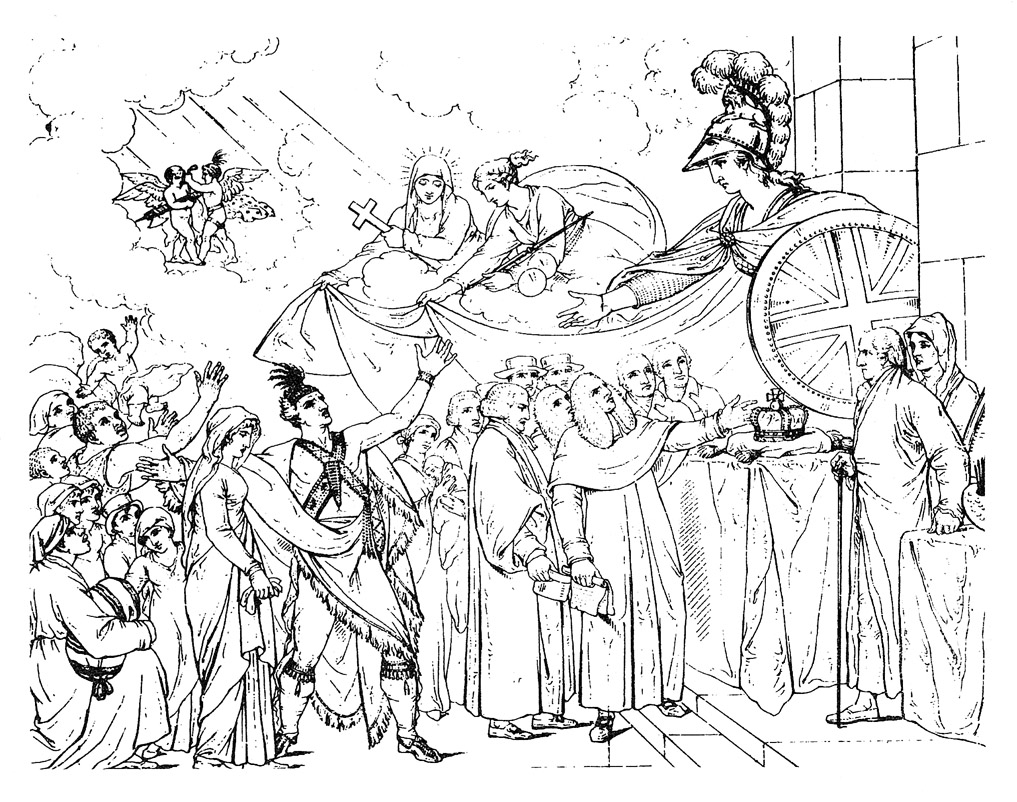
An engraving by Henry Moses depicting West's Reception of the American Loyalists

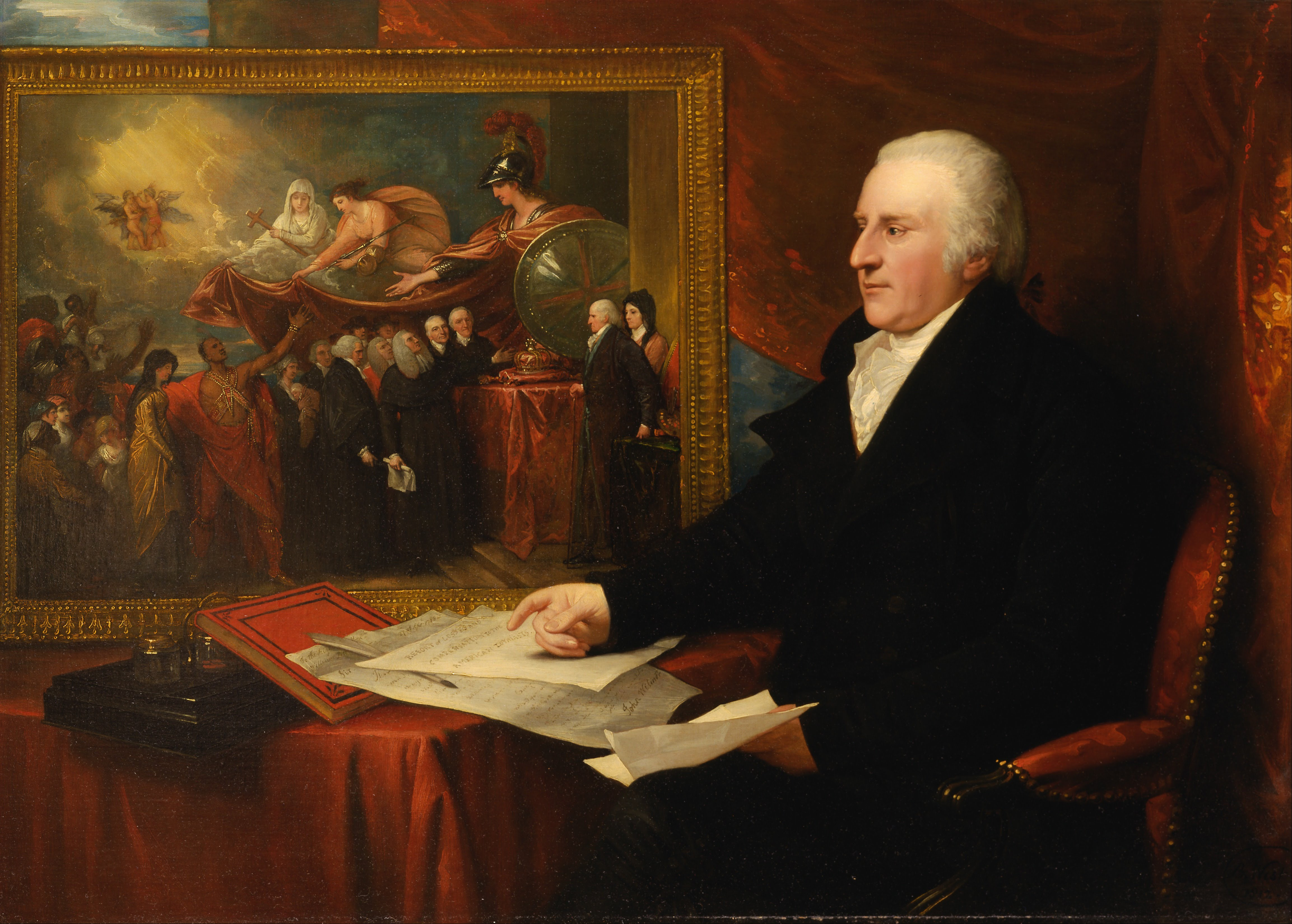
Benjamin West's Reception of the American Loyalists in the background of his 1812 portrait of John Eardley-Wilmot

Reception of the American Loyalists by Great Britain in the Year 1783 is a historical composition painted in 1812 by American-born artist Benjamin West, depicting the return of the Loyalists to the British Empire following their expulsion from the United States in the wake of the American Revolutionary War. The painting features Loyalists of European, African, and Native American descent being welcomed by Britannia, who stands above the British Crown. Also present are allegorical figures representing Justice and Religion, as well as a pair of putti in the top-left corner personifying Britain and America.

The original painting was long believed to have been lost until research published in 2025 concluded that Reception of the American Loyalists as it appears in the background of an 1812 portrait of the politician John Eardley-Wilmot—an image previously thought to be a copy of an earlier painting—is, in fact, West's original version of the picture.

== Background ==
Britannia had existed as a national personification of Great Britain and the British people since ancient times, while West's previous work as a painter had developed a deep sense of British nationalism, as seen in his Death of General Wolfe and other works painted after his appointment as court painter. West was "not directly involved in the American Revolutionary War, [but] nevertheless had friends, family and colleagues affected by the outcome of the conflict", shaping his view of the Revolution and its fallout.

The Loyalists, inhabitants of the Thirteen Colonies who had remained loyal to the Crown in resistance to the Patriot cause, were commonly noted as transcending racial boundaries. In addition to white colonists who sided with British rule out of conservatism, privilege or reformism, Patriot-owned slaves were officially offered freedom in return for their defection while the Iroquois were polarized between pro-British and anti-interventionist factions. After their defeat in the Revolutionary War, the various anti-Patriot groups were expelled en masse from the newly-founded United States, with about 100,000 fleeing primarily to remaining British colonies in what is today Canada. The Loyalists formed many communities both there and abroad that persist to this day, receiving land grants handled through the Loyalist Claims Commission, though the Black Loyalists would continue to face discrimination for generations to come.

== Painting and analysis ==
The figures holding Britannia's train to her right can be identified as Religion and Justice, emphasizing the righteousness of the Loyalist cause, while Britannia herself is shown equipped with a shield with a Union Jack emblazed on it and extending an arm towards the figures below. The Loyalists are depicted as noble and multiracial, with a group of white lawmakers in full dress pledging themselves to the Crown beneath Britannia; Her gesture is instead answered by a central figure of an Indigenous warrior standing alongside a woman and a family of Black Loyalists. The painting is considered historically and culturally significant for its depiction of the Black Loyalists, however historian Barry Cahill instead criticized the painting as presenting what he considered an idealized and inaccurate mythologization of the Black Loyalists' history in Atlantic Canada. He heavily cited the pro-slavery views and practices of many white Loyalists and characterized Black Loyalists as opportunistic freedom-seekers only trying to survive in what was an inherently oppressive society.

== History ==
Reception of the American Loyalists was painted by Benjamin West between January and May 1812 as part of his larger portrait of the English politician John Eardley-Wilmot. That same year, the painting was displayed at the annual exhibition of the Royal Academy of Arts in London. In 1815, Henry Moses completed an engraving of the composition to accompany a text authored by Eardley-Wilmot. The original painting remained in Eardley-Wilmot's family until it was purchased by Paul Mellon in 1970. Today, the portrait with Reception of the American Loyalists in the background can be found in the collection of the Yale Center for British Art in New Haven, Connecticut.

Texts describing Reception of the American Loyalists often incorrectly characterize it as a "lost" painting due to a misconception that it was originally created independently from West's portrait of Eardley-Wilmot. While the 1815 engraving by Henry Moses features the composition as a standalone image, Benjamin West never painted an independent version of the work.
