= Peter H. Feist =

German art historian

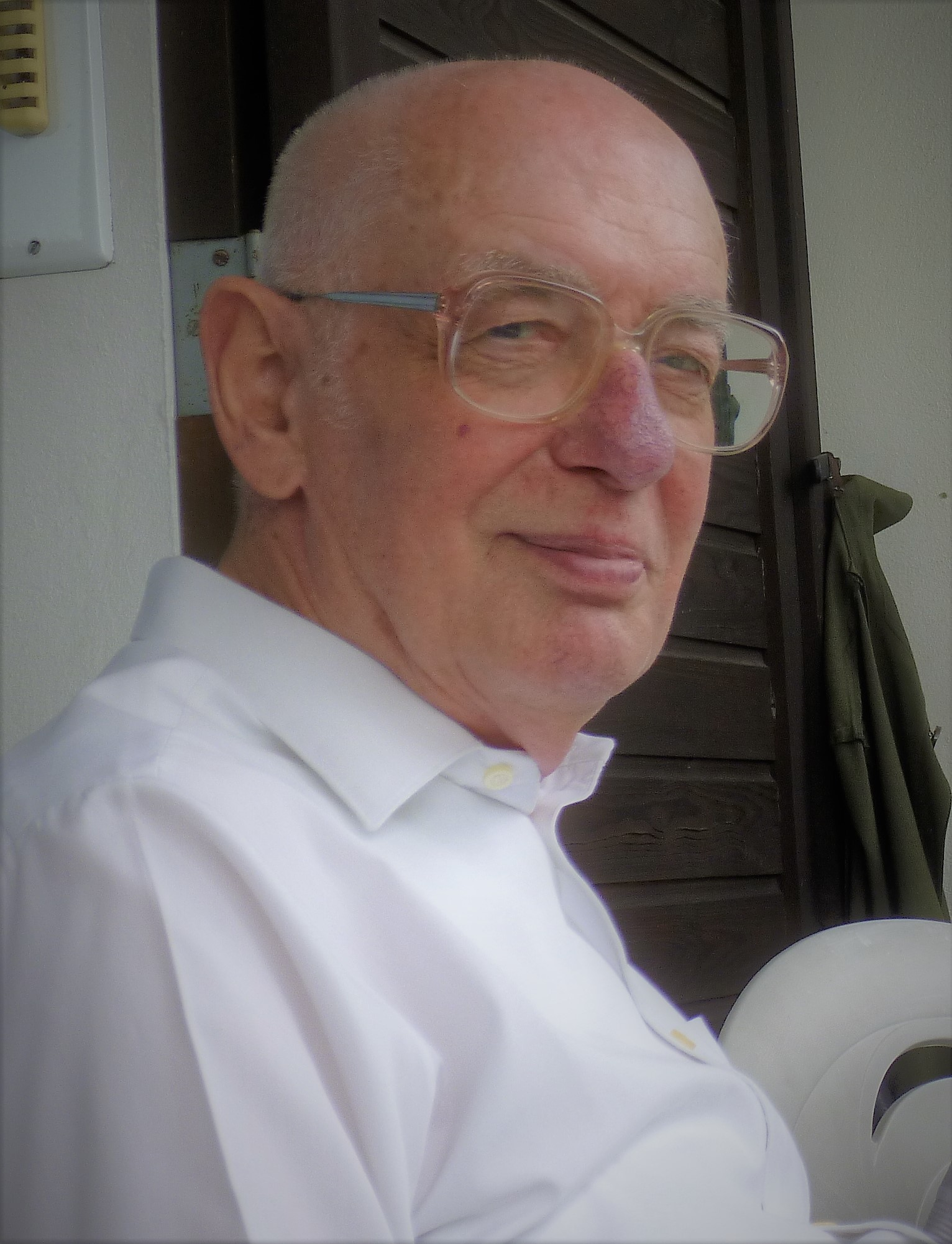
Peter H. Feist (2013)

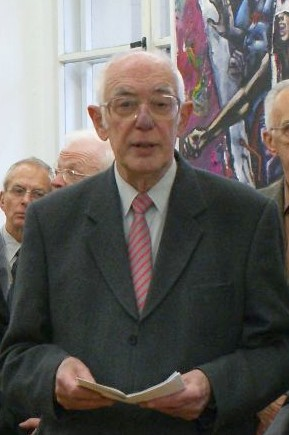
Peter H. Feist (2009)

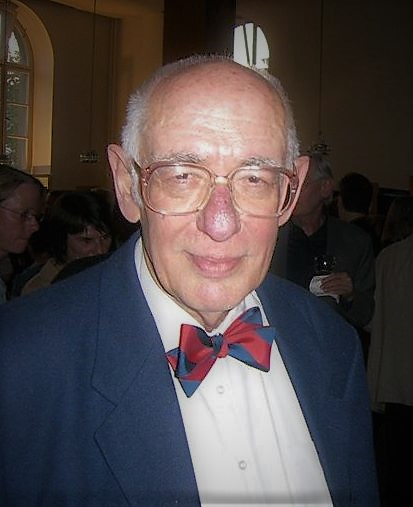
Peter H. Feist (2006)

Peter Heinz Feist (29 July 1928 – 26 July 2015) was a German art historian.

== Life ==
Feist was born in 1928 in Warnsdorf in northern Bohemia, where he grew up. His father Georg H. Feist was a surgeon and in 1926 he moved with his wife from Prague to Warnsdorf, where he took over the management of the municipal hospital. Peter's mother, Isolde Feist née Sojka, was a nurse who as a so-called half-Jewish woman converted to Lutheranism before her marriage in 1923; her father was a wealthy wine and spirits merchant from Reichenberg. In 1932 Peter's parents divorced. His mother was later murdered together with her second husband and half-brother in 1944 in the Auschwitz concentration camp.

In Warnsdorf Feist attended elementary school and Gymnasium from 1934 to 1944. His Latin teacher was Rita Hetzer, the later Romance scholar and literary scholar Rita Schober, who was also the reviewer of his habilitation in 1966 and whose professorial colleague he became in 1968 at the Humboldt University of Berlin (HUB). As a youth, Feist was still deployed in the last months of the Second World War from 1944 to early 1945 as Luftwaffenhelfer in Malbork.

After the war the family moved to Lutherstadt Wittenberg. In 1947 he caught up his Abitur there and studied art history, history and classical archaeology and oriental archaeology at the Martin-Luther-University Halle-Wittenberg (MLU) until 1952. In his diploma thesis he wrote about Untersuchungen zur Bedeutung orientalischer Einflüsse für die Kunst des frühen Mittelalters (Investigations on the meaning of oriental influences for the art of the early Middle Ages). After his studies he worked at the MLU from 1952 to 1958 as assistant, aspirant, senior assistant and lecturer of Wilhelm Worringer at the Art History Institute. On 11 March 1958 he received his doctorate there with the thesis Die Stilstruktur von der altorientalischen bis zur romanischen Kunst (Style Structure from Ancient Oriental to Romanesque Art). He had been a member of the SED since 1954.

Before he moved with his family to East-Berlin in 1962, he first worked from 1958 as a senior assistant and preceptor at the Humboldt University of Berlin (HUB). He obtained his habilitation on 14 November 1966, after submitting a thesis on Bereicherung und Begrenzung der Malerei durch den französischen Impressionismus. Ein Beitrag zur Problematik der Kunstgeschichte in der zweiten Hälfte des 19. Jahrhunderts (The Enrichment and Limitation of Painting in French Impressionism. A Contribution to Problems of Art History in the Second Half of the 19th Century). In 1967 he was appointed as a lecturer, in 1968 as a professor with a teaching position and in 1969 as professor in the Aesthetics and Art Sciences section of the HUB. From 1966 to 1968 he worked as interim director of the Institute of Art History, then until 1973 as deputy director of the Aesthetics and Art Studies Section, and from 1977, as head of the Art Studies Department within this section.

Feist undertook many study trips and conference visits beginning in 1950, as well as delivering lectures in most European countries (including London, Lund, Moscow, Munich, Paris, Prague, Sofia, Stockholm, Uppsala) Burma, India and the USA. In 1961 his first book on the painter Auguste Renoir was published, and translated into Polish and Hungarian. In 1987 a revised licensed edition followed in Cologne; the book has since been translated into about 20 languages.

From 1982 until his early retirement in mid-1990, Feist was director of the Institute for Aesthetics and Art Studies of the Academy of Sciences of the GDR. He was a member of the Leibniz-Sozietät der Wissenschaften zu Berlin. He retired in 1993. He worked on several books and published reviews and art criticism in daily newspapers.

In 1950 Feist and Gisela Münster (1927–2004) whom he got to know as a student of German and English language and literature in Halle married; she was then a lecturer at the Arbeiter-und-Bauern-Fakultät (ABF) of the University of Halle until 1959. In 1953, the son Michael Feist was born. He studied chemistry at the HUB from 1971 to 1975, and in 1980, after an aspirancy at the Moscow State University, he became a professor at the University of Halle (MGU) and since then has worked at the HUB as a research assistant. He has two daughters: Ulrike Holzapfel née Feist (b.1978) and Katja Feist (b. 1998).

Feist last lived in Berlin-Pankow and died three days before his 87th birthday.

== Memberships and honours ==
- 1959–1990 Member of the art science section of the Verband Bildender Künstler der DDR
- 1964 Verdienstmedaille der DDR
- 1965–1990 Member of the Association Internationale des Critiques d’Art (AICA, Internationale Vereinigung der Kunstkritiker), temporarily head of the DDR section
- 1966–1968 and 1972–1981 Head of the Art Studies Group in the Advisory Board for Cultural, Art and Linguistic Studies of the Ministry of Higher and Technical Education (East Germany)
- 1967 activist of the seven-year plan of the GDR
- 1968–1990 Member of the Central Board of the Verband Bildender Künstler der DDR (VBK)
- 1968 Badge of honor of the Liga für Völkerfreundschaft
- 1969–2010 Member of the Comité International d'Histoire de l'Art (CIHA), until 1990 as one of the representatives of the GDR, afterwards honorary
- since 1969 Chairman of the National Committee for Art History
- 1969–1991 Associate member of the Akademie der Künste der DDR, full member since 1972.
- 1973 Johannes R. Becher Medal of the cultural association of the GDR
- 1974–1991 Corresponding member of the German Academy of Sciences at Berlin
- 1975 and 1980 National Prize of the German Democratic Republic
- 1976 Order of the Banner of Labor (collectively)
- 1982 Hans Grundig Medal of the Verband der Bildenden Künstler der DDR
- 1984 Otto Nagel Medal of the district association of visual artists Berlin
- 1985 Visiting Senior Fellow at the Center for Advanced Study in the Visual Arts of the National Gallery of Art in Washington for three months
- 1988 Patriotic Order of Merit in Bronze
- 1989 Medal of honour on the 40th anniversary of the GDR
- 1990–2010 Membre honoraire of the CIHA
- 1993–2015 Member of the Leibniz-Sozietät der Wissenschaften zu Berlin.

== Publications ==
- Plastiken der Deutschen Romanik. 2nd edition. Verlag der Kunst, Dresden 1960.
- Auguste Renoir, E. A. Seemann Verlag, Leipzig 1961.
- Paul Cézanne. E. A. Seemann Verlag, Leipzig 1963.
- Prinzipien und Methoden marxistischer Kunstwissenschaft: Versuch eines Abrisses. E. A. Seemann, Buch- und Kunstverlag, Leipzig 1966.
- Lexikon der Kunst. Leipzig 1968–1978, 1987–1994 (co-ed.).
- Impressionistische Malerei in Frankreich. 3rd edition. Verlag der Kunst, Dresden 1972.
- Die National Gallery London. 4th edition. E. A. Seemann Verlag, Leipzig 1976.
- Künstler, Kunstwerk und Gesellschaft: Studien zur Kunstgeschichte und zur Methodologie der Kunstwissenschaft Verlag der Kunst, Dresden 1978 (Fundus-Reihe 51/52).
- Monet. 2nd edition. Verlag der Kunst, Dresden 1983.
- Geschichte der deutschen Kunst. E. A. Seemann Verlag, Leipzig. A total of 8 volumes, including 2 volumes by Peter H. Feist herausgegeben:
1. Band 1760–1848. Leipzig 1986, ISBN 3-363-00003-0. (among others with Thomas Häntzsche, Ulrike Krenzlin, Gisold Lammel, Helga Paditz).
2. Band 1848–1890. Leipzig 1987, ISBN 3-363-00050-2. (among others with Dieter Golgner, Ulrike Krenzlin, Gisold Lammel).
- Renoir. Ein Traum von Harmonie. Taschen Verlag, Cologne 1987, ISBN 978-3-8228-0251-9.
- Impressionismus. Die Entdeckung der Freizeit. E. A. Seemann-Verlag, Leipzig, 1993, ISBN 978-3-363-00594-3.
- Figur und Objekt. Plastik im 20. Jahrhundert – eine Einführung und 200 Biographien. Seemann Verlag, Leipzig 1996, ISBN 3-363-00657-8.
- Metzler-Kunsthistoriker-Lexikon. Zweihundertzehn Porträts deutschsprachiger Autoren aus vier Jahrhunderten. 2nd edition. J. B. Metzler’sche Verlagsbuchhandlung und Carl Ernst Poeschel Verlag, Stuttgart 2007, ISBN 978-3-476-05262-9 (with Peter Betthausen and Christiane Fork).
- Französischer Impressionismus. Malerei des Impressionismus 1860–1920. Taschen Verlag, Cologne 1995, ISBN 978-3-8228-8702-8.
- Hauptstraßen und eigene Wege – Rückschau eines Kunsthistorikers. With an epilogue by Horst Bredekamp. Lukas Verlag für Kunst- und Geistesgeschichte, Berlin 2016, ISBN 978-3-86732-231-7.

== Literature ==
- Lothar Mertens: Lexikon der DDR-Historiker. Biographien und Bibliographien zu den Geschichtswissenschaftlern aus der Deutschen Demokratischen Republik. Saur, Munich 2006, ISBN 3-598-11673-X, p. 208.
- Jan Wielgohs: "Feist, Peter Heinz". In: Wer war wer in der DDR? 5th edition. Volume 1, Ch. Links, Berlin 2010, ISBN 978-3-86153-561-4.
- Horst Bredekamp: Nachruf. In Peter H. Feist: Hauptstraßen und eigene Wege, Rückschau eines Kunsthistorikers. Lukas Verlag für Kunst- und Geistesgeschichte, Berlin 2016, ISBN 978-3-86732-231-7.
- Peter Betthausen, Michael Feist (ed.): Nachlese. Ansichten von Bildender Kunst und Kunstgeschichte (Textsammlung). Lukas Verlag für Kunst- und Geistesgeschichte, Berlin 2016, 200 p. (with complete bibliography), ISBN 978-3-86732-232-4.
- Peter Arlt (ed.): Künstler, Kunstwerk und Gesellschaft – Gedenkveranstaltung für Peter H. Feist, 8 December 2016. With contributions from Hans-Otto Dill, Emerita Pansowova, Fritz Jacobi, Jens Semrau, Ulrike Krenzlin, Gerd-Helge Vogel, Peter Arlt, Michael Feist, Harald Metzkes, Claude Keisch, Peter Michel, Ronald Paris, Diana Al-Jumaili. Meeting reports of the Leibniz-Sozietät der Wissenschaften in Berlin, volume 132, pp. 47–72, year 2017. trafo Wissenschaftsverlag Dr. Wolfgang Weist, Berlin 2017, ISBN 978-3-86464-155-8
- Curriculum Vitae Prof. Dr. Peter H. Feist. In Peter Arlt (ed.): Künstler, Kunstwerk und Gesellschaft – Gedenkveranstaltung für Peter H. Feist, 8 December 2016. Meeting reports of the Leibniz-Sozietät der Wissenschaften in Berlin, volume 132, pp. 161–164, year 2017. trafo Wissenschaftsverlag Dr. Wolfgang Weist, Berlin 2017, ISBN 978-3-86464-155-8.
