= Expulsion of the Loyalists =

Aftermath of the American Revolution

- Part of the American Revolution and American immigration to Canada
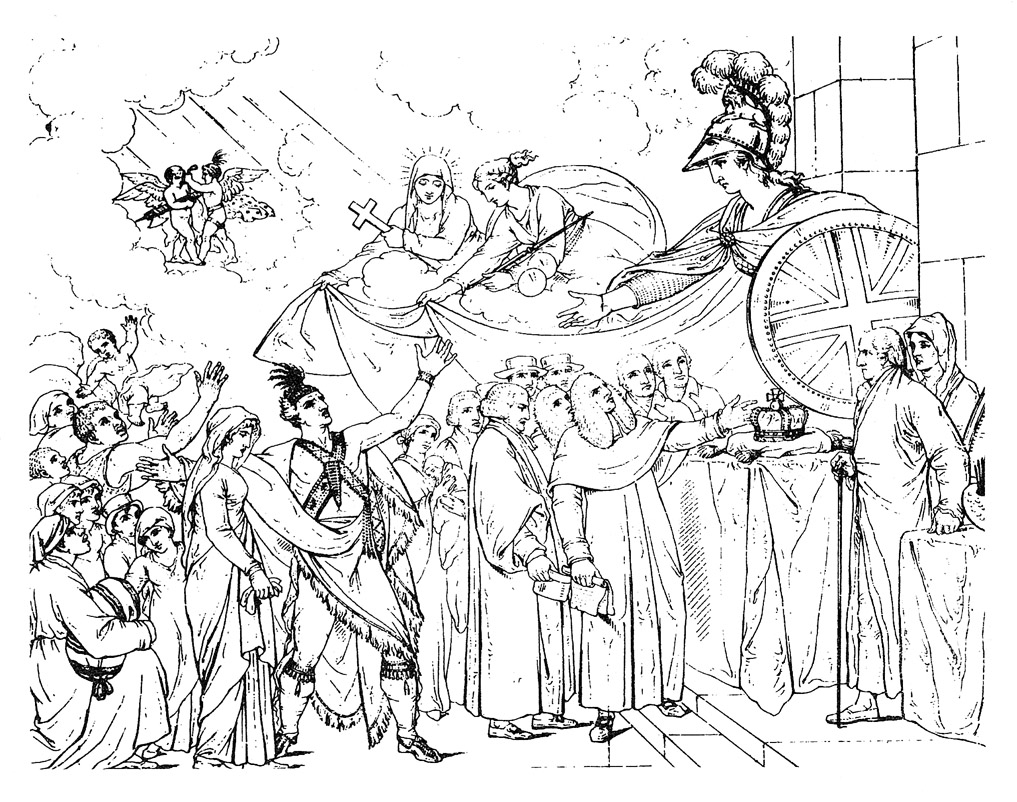
- Loyalists receiving protection from Britannia, Reception of the American Loyalists by Great Britain in the Year 1783 by Benjamin West
- Participants: Government of the British Empire; Government of United States; Loyalists (United Empire Loyalist)
- Outcome: Estimated 88,400 refugees

During the American Revolution (1765–1783), those who continued to support King George III of Great Britain came to be known as Loyalists. Loyalists are to be contrasted with Patriots, who supported American republicanism. Historians have estimated that during the American Revolution, between 15 and 20 percent of the white population of the colonies, or about 500,000 people, were Loyalists. As the American Revolutionary War concluded with Great Britain defeated by the Americans and the French, the most active Loyalists were no longer welcome in the United States, and sought to move elsewhere in the British Empire. The large majority (about 80%–90%) of the Loyalists remained in the United States and enjoyed full citizenship there.

- 61,000 White loyalists (who also had 17,000 slaves)
- 3,500 free Black loyalists emigrate to Canada.
- 2,000 enslaved Blacks are taken to Canada
- 42,000 Whites emigrate to Canada
- 3,400 Native Iroquois emigrate to Canada
- 7,000 Whites emigrate to Britain
- 5,000 free Blacks emigrate to Britain
- 12,000 Whites emigrate to Florida or the Caribbean
- 6,500 enslaved Blacks are taken to Florida

Maya Jasanoff (2012) estimates that a total of 60,000 white settlers left the new United States. The majority of them—about 33,000—went to Nova Scotia (14,000 of these to what would become New Brunswick), 6,600 went to Quebec (which at the time included modern-day Ontario), and 2,000 to Prince Edward Island. About 5,000 white Loyalists went to Florida (then a Spanish possession), bringing along their slaves who numbered about 6,500. About 7,000 Whites and 5,000 free Blacks went to Britain.

The departing Loyalists were offered free land in British North America. Many were prominent colonists whose ancestors had originally settled in the early 17th century, while a portion were recent settlers in the Thirteen Colonies with few economic or social ties. Many had their property confiscated by Patriots. A later wave of roughly 30,000 Americans, who came to be known as 'Late Loyalists' were lured by the promise of land upon swearing loyalty to the King and voluntarily moved to Ontario in the 1790s into the first decade of the 1800s. Unlike that of the first group of 'refugee' Loyalists, this later group's perceived "loyalty" is a topic which remains in historical debate. Many of these later Loyalists came to oppose and became the most ardent opposition to the staunch Toryism which was exercised by the ruling class in the new colony.

Loyalists resettled in what was initially the Province of Quebec (including modern-day Ontario), and in Nova Scotia (including modern-day New Brunswick). Their arrival marked the arrival of an English-speaking population in the future Canada west and east of the Quebec border. Many Loyalists from the American South brought their slaves with them as slavery was also legal in Canada. An act passed by the British Parliament, the Settlers in American Colonies Act 1790 (30 Geo. 3. c. 27), assured prospective immigrants to Canada that their slaves would remain their property. However more black Loyalists were free, having been given their freedom from slavery by fighting for the British or joining British lines during the Revolution. The government helped them resettle in Canada as well, transporting nearly 3,500 free blacks to New Brunswick.

== Origins ==
The reasons that the Loyalists remained pro-British were either loyalty to the King and unwillingness to rebel against the Crown, or the belief in peaceful and evolutionary independence; Daniel Bliss, future Chief Justice of New Brunswick spoke to the latter: "Better to live under one tyrant a thousand miles away, than a thousand tyrants one mile away."

=== Resistance of the Loyalists ===
Loyalist troops at the Battle of Kings Mountain

Loyalists eventually exacted revenge through the actions of paramilitary units like "Butler's Rangers." John Butler was a New York landowner before the revolution. He was driven from his land by rebels because he supported the established government of the Crown. Therefore, during the revolution he formed a guerrilla force with others who fought for their homes. They would disrupt the Continental (American) Army's supply lines, demoralize settlers, and attack Patriot paramilitary groups not unlike his own.

=== Attacks on royal officials and Loyalists ===
The Loyalists during the American revolution had to face two kinds of persecution. One was done constitutionally, the other by lawless mobs. Patriots refused to tolerate Loyalists who were active on behalf of the king and called for the king to send forces to destroy the Patriots.

It was at the hands of the mob that senior British officials first suffered attacks. Probably the worst of the revolutionary mobs was that which paraded the streets of Boston. In 1765, at the time of the Stamp Act agitation, large crowds in Boston attacked and destroyed the houses of Andrew Oliver and Lieutenant Governor Thomas Hutchinson.

"They broke down the doors with broadaxes, destroyed the furniture, stole the money and jewels, scattered the books and papers, and, having drunk the wines in the cellar, proceeded to the dismantling of the roof and walls. The owners of the houses barely escaped with their lives."

In 1770, a mob deliberately pelted one unit of British troops with clubs, stones, and snowballs; the troops opened fire without command, killing five in the Boston Massacre. In 1773, Bostonians, some disguised as Indians, in the famous Boston Tea Party threw tea into Boston harbor in protest of the Tea Act; the tea was ruined but no people were hurt. To teach the colonials a lesson the British Parliament passed the Intolerable Acts, which stripped Massachusetts of its traditional self-rule and sent General Thomas Gage to govern the province.

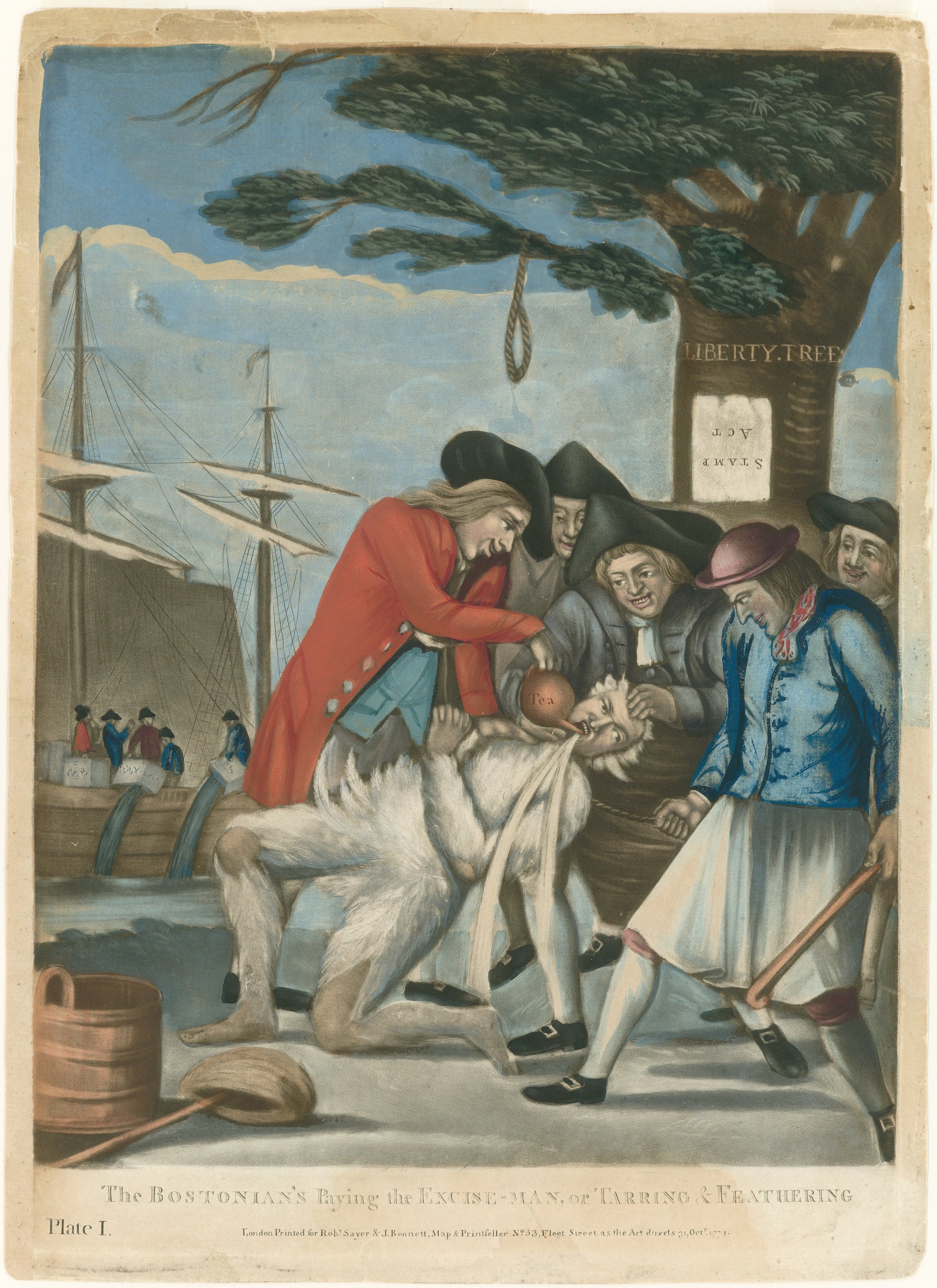
The customs officer John Malcolm gets tarred and feathered as many others were in Boston 1774.

The anger of the Patriots spread up and down the 13 colonies. In New York they were active in destroying printing-presses from which had issued Tory pamphlets, breaking windows of private houses, stealing livestock and personal effects, and destroying property. A favorite pastime was tarring and feathering 'obnoxious Tories.' Recalcitrant Loyalists might be treated to a common punishment, riding the rail, in painful fashion.

After Yorktown the British were left in control of only one significant stronghold, New York City. It was the main debarkation point for Loyalists leaving America. The British Army remained until November 1783.

Numerous Loyalists who chose exile abandoned substantial amounts of property in the new nation. The British government provided some compensation and tried to get the rest from the U.S. It was an issue during the negotiation of the Jay Treaty in 1794. Negotiations resulted on the U.S. government 'advising' the states to provide restitution. More than two centuries later, some of the descendants of Loyalists still assert claims to their ancestors' property in the United States.

== Resettlement ==
=== Great Britain ===
Some of the richest and most prominent Loyalists went to Britain. Southern Loyalists, many taking along their slaves, went to the West Indies and the Bahamas, particularly to the Abaco Islands.

About 6,000 of the exiles went to London or other British locales. Many had been prominent in American society, but now felt like unwelcome strangers. It was very hard to find suitable jobs; only 315 were given government pensions. Wallace Brown argues that they formed new organizations, often criticized the British government, and were uncomfortable with "the superciliousness, debauchery, and class structure of British society." Many advised Loyalists still in the United States to remain there rather than flee to Britain. Some returned to the United States.

=== British North America ===
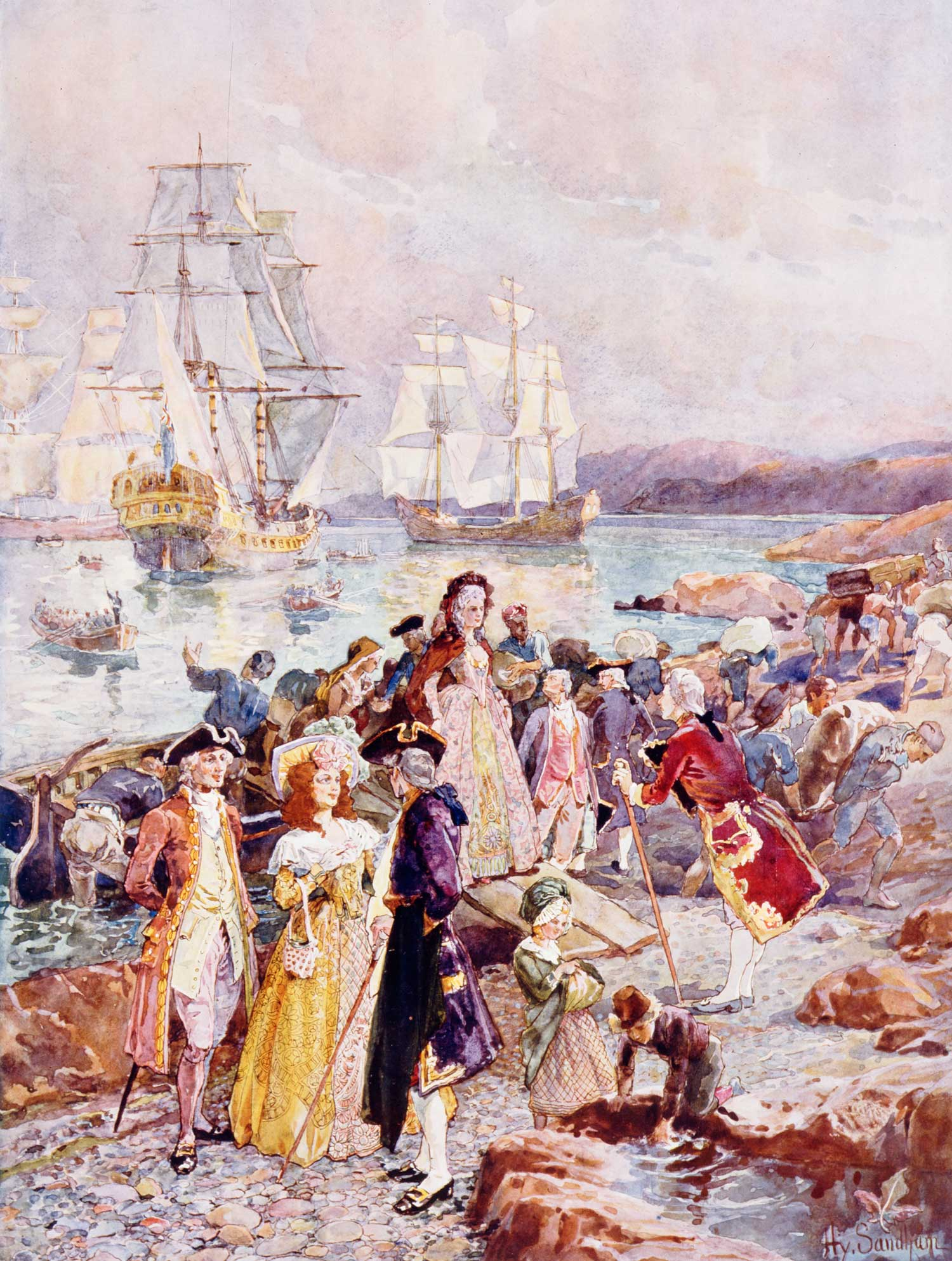
The Arrival of Loyalists in present-day New Brunswick

Many Loyalist refugees resettled in Canada after losing their place, property, and security during the Revolution. The Loyalists, some of whose ancestors helped found America, left a well-armed population hostile to the king and his loyalist subjects to build the new nation of Canada. The motto of New Brunswick, created out of Nova Scotia for loyalist settlement, became "Hope Restored".

Loyalist refugees, later called United Empire Loyalists, began leaving at the end of the war whenever transport was available, at considerable loss of property and transfer of wealth. An estimated 85,000 left the new nation, representing about 2% of the total American population. Approximately 61,000 were White (who also had 17,000 slaves) and 8,000 free blacks; of the Whites 42,000 went to Canada, 7,000 to Britain, and 12,000 to the Caribbean.

Following the end of the Revolution and the signing of the Treaty of Paris in 1783, Loyalist soldiers and civilians were evacuated from New York and resettled in other colonies of the British Empire, most notably in the future Canada. The two colonies of Nova Scotia and New Brunswick received about 33,000 Loyalist refugees combined; Prince Edward Island 2,000; and Quebec (including the Eastern Townships and modern-day Ontario) received some 10,000 refugees, 6,600 white, and several thousand Iroquois from New York State. Some unknown number, but in places a large percentage, of refugees were unable to establish themselves successfully in British North America especially in Nova Scotia, and eventually returned to the United States or moved to Ontario. Many in Canada continued to maintain close ties with relatives in the United States, and as well conducted commerce across the border without much regard to British trade laws.

Thousands of Iroquois and other pro-British Native Americans were expelled from New York and other states and resettled in Canada. The descendants of one such group of Iroquois, led by Joseph Brant Thayendenegea, settled at Six Nations of the Grand River, today the most populated First Nations reserve in Canada. Smaller group of Iroquois settled on the shores of the Bay of Quinte in modern-day Southeastern Ontario and on the Akwesasne Reserve in Quebec.

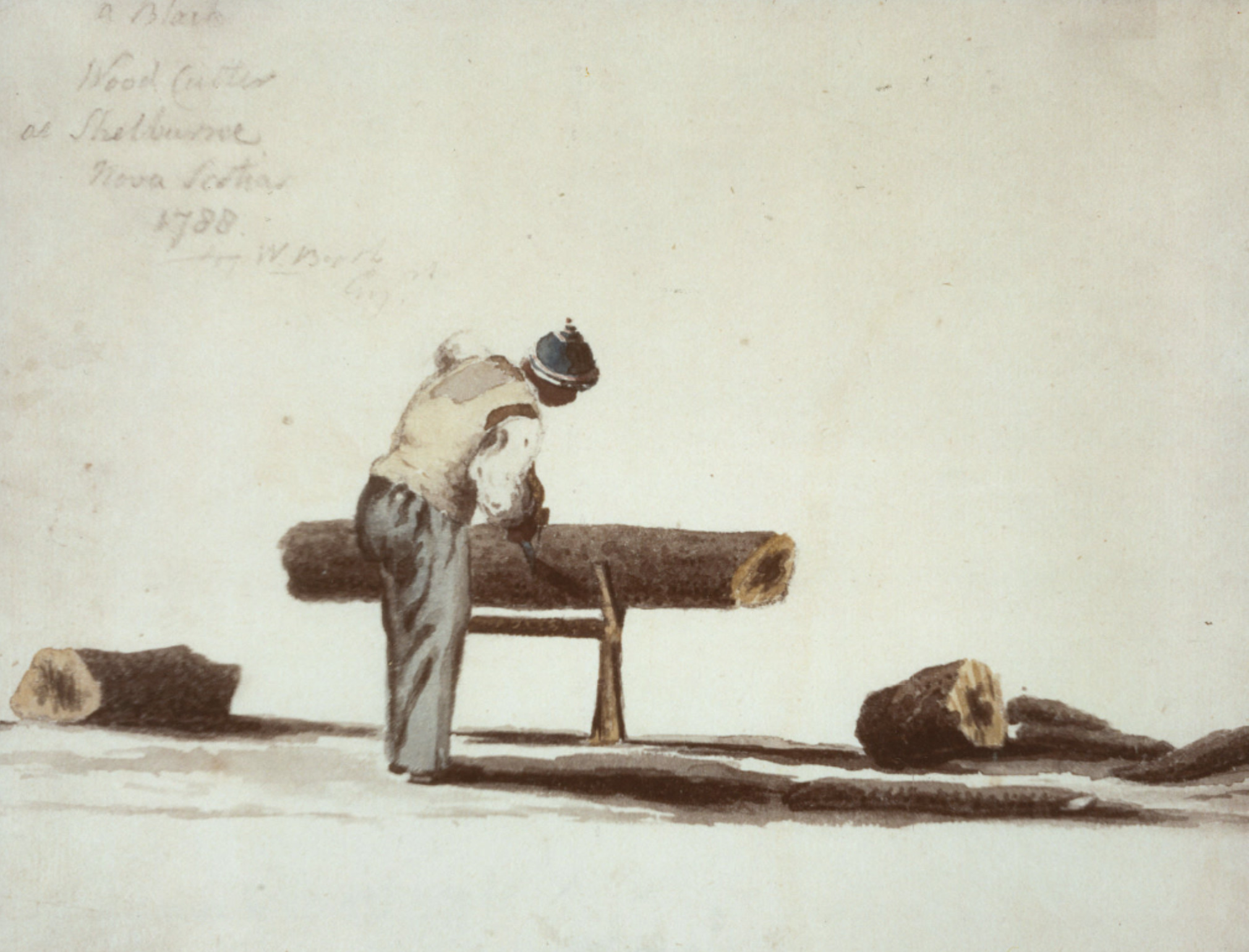
1788 illustration of a Black woodcutter in Shelburne, Nova Scotia

The government settled numerous Black Loyalists in Nova Scotia, but they faced inadequate support on arrival. The government was slow to survey their land (which meant they could not settle) and awarded them smaller grants in less convenient locations than those of white settlers in Nova Scotia. Further, as a result of labour competition and substandard pay, they suffered discrimination by some of the whites. When Great Britain set up the colony of Sierra Leone in West Africa, approximately one third of the Black Loyalists emigrated there for what they perceived as the chance of self-government and established Freetown in 1792 where their descendants identified as the Sierra Leone Creoles.

=== Resistance to the old Canadian System ===
In 1778, Frederick Haldimand took over for Guy Carleton as governor of Quebec. Haldimand, like the previous governors of the Province of Quebec, appreciated the hard-working Canadiens and acted in his power to keep the English merchants in line.

The arrival of 10,000 Loyalists to Quebec in 1784 destroyed the political balance that Haldimand (and Carleton before him) had worked so hard to achieve. The swelling numbers of English encouraged them to make greater demands for recognition with the colonial government. To restore stability to his largest remaining North American colony, King George III sent Carleton back to Quebec to remedy the situation.

In ten years, Quebec underwent a dramatic change. What worked for Carleton in 1774 was not likely to succeed in 1784. Specifically, there was no possibility of restoring the previous political balance — there were simply too many English people unwilling to reach a compromise with the 145,000 Canadiens or its colonial governor. The situation called for a more creative approach to problem solving.

==== Separation of the Province of Quebec ====
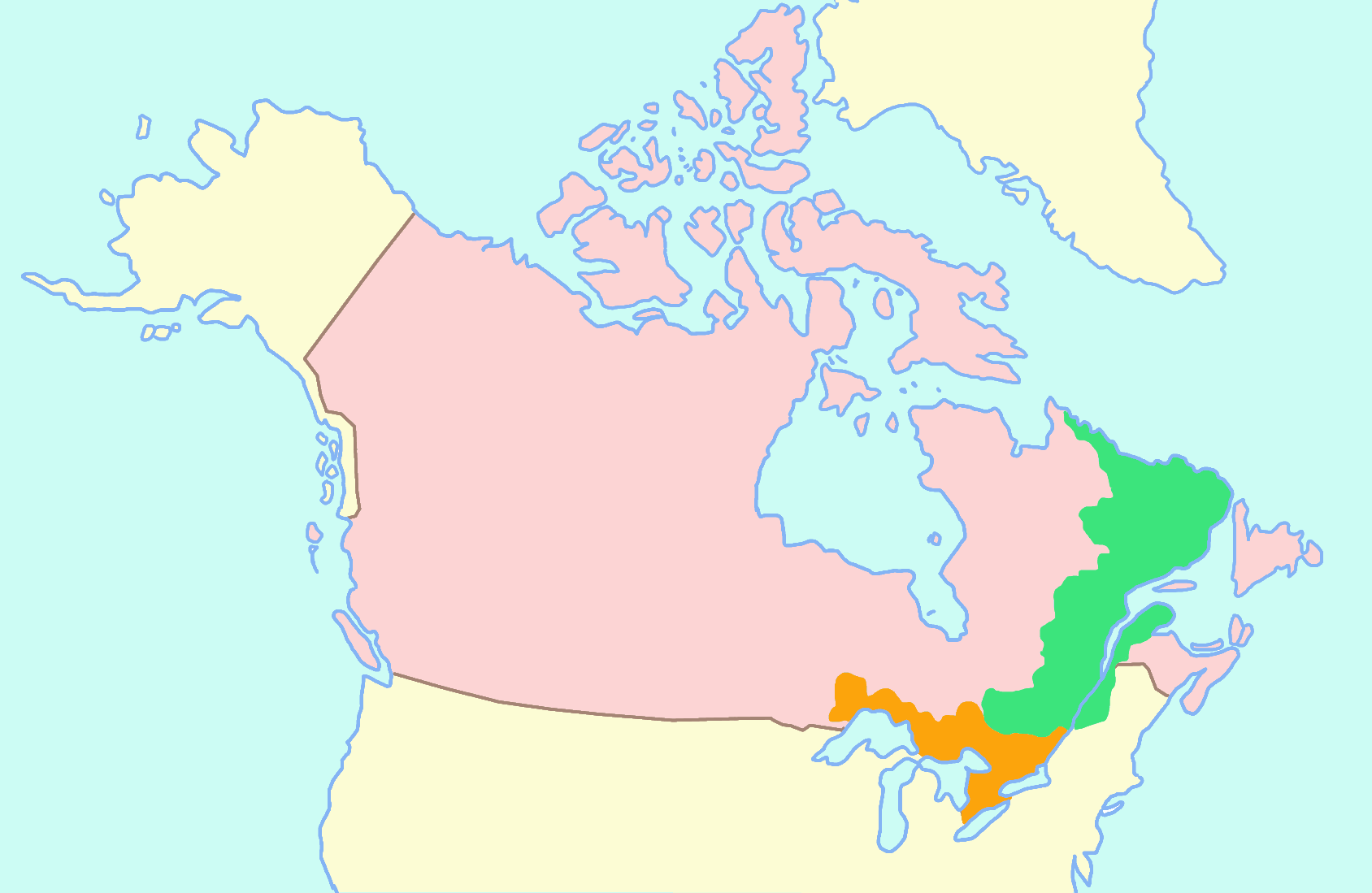
Map of The Canadas, with Lower Canada shown in green and Upper Canada shown in orange

Loyalists soon petitioned the government to be allowed to use the British legal system they were used to in the American colonies. The creation of Upper Canada allowed most Loyalists to live under British laws and institutions, while the French-speaking population of Lower Canada could maintain their familiar French civil law and the Catholic religion.

The authorities believed that the two peoples simply could not co-exist. Therefore, Governor Haldimand (at the suggestion of Carleton) drew Loyalists away from Quebec City and Montreal by offering free land on the northern shore of Lake Ontario to anyone willing to swear allegiance to George III. The Loyalists were thus given land grants of 200 acres (81 ha) per person. Basically, this approach was designed with the intent of keeping French and English as far apart as possible. Therefore, after the separation of the Province of Quebec, Lower Canada and Upper Canada were formed in 1791, each with its own government.

==== Separation of Nova Scotia ====
Fourteen-thousand Loyalists established a new settlement along the Saint John River. Not long after establishing Saint John these Loyalists asked for their own colony. In 1784, Great Britain divided Nova Scotia into two—New Brunswick and Nova Scotia. Colonel Thomas Carleton, younger brother of Guy Carleton, was named New Brunswick's first lieutenant-governor—a position he held for the next 30 years.
