= Henry Moses (engraver) =

English engraver (1781–1870)

Henry Moses (8 May 1781 – 28 February 1870) was an English engraver. He was born at Marylebone and died at Cowley, Middlesex.

== Works ==
Moses was one of the engravers employed on the official publication Ancient Marbles in the British Museum, 1812–1845. Other works included:

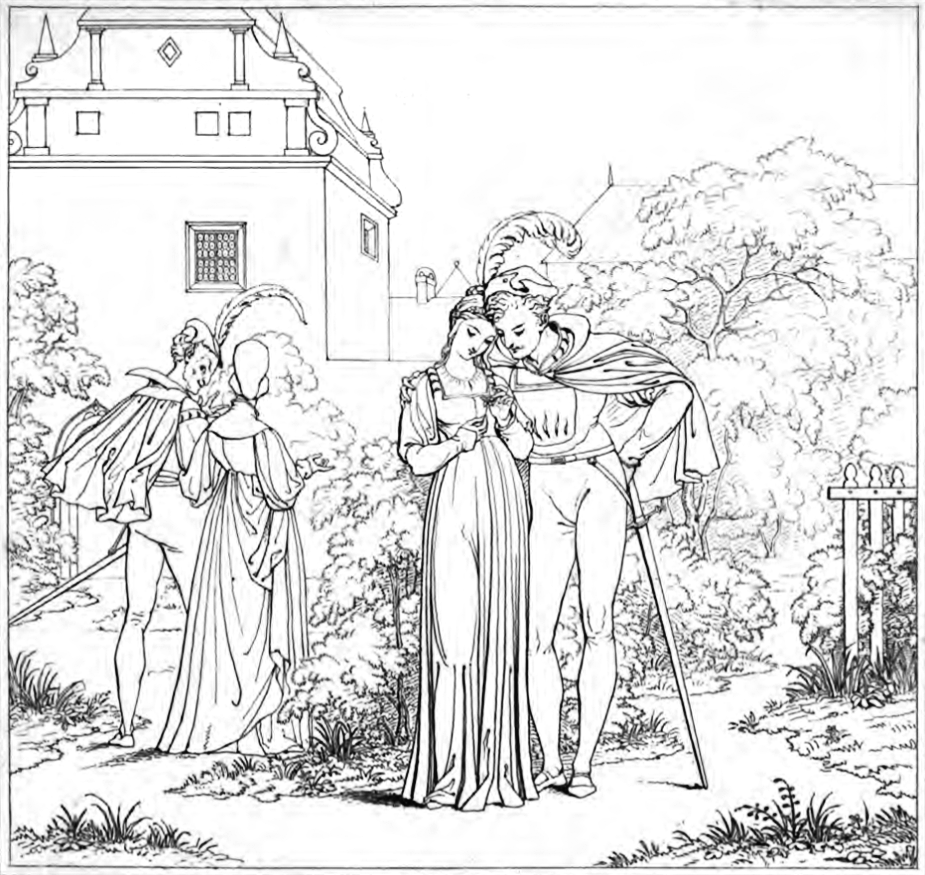
The Decision of the Flower by Henry Moses after Moritz Retzsch, illustration to Goethe's Faust I

- The Gallery of Pictures painted by Benjamin West, 12 plates, 1811 (patronage of Thomas Hope);
- A Collection of Antique Vases, Altars, &c., from various Museums and Collections, 170 plates, 1814;
- Select Greek and Roman Antiquities, 36 plates, 1817;
- Vases from the Collection of Sir Henry Englefield, 40 plates, 1819;
- Examples of Ornamental Sculpture in Architecture, drawn by L. Vulliamy, 36 plates, 1823;
- Illustrations to Goethe's Faust, after Moritz Retzsch, 26 plates, 1821;
- Illustrations to Schiller's Fridolin and Fight with the Dragon, 1824 and 1825;
- Georg Heinrich Noehden's Specimens of Ancient Coins of Magna Graecia and Sicily, 24 stipple plates, 1826;
- Works of Canova, with text by Countess Albrizzi, 3 vols. 1824–8; and
- Selections of Ornamental Sculpture from the Louvre, 9 plates, 1828.

Moses contributed many of the illustrations to James Hakewill's Tour of Italy, 1820, and Woburn Abbey Marbles, 1822. He etched from his own designs Picturesque Views of Ramsgate, 23 plates, 1817; Sketches of Shipping and Marine Sketch Book, 1824 (reissued by Ackermann, 1837); and Visit of William IV, when Duke of Clarence, to Portsmouth in 1827, 17 plates, 1830. Moses's final work was a set of twenty-two illustrations to Pilgrim's Progress, after Henry Courtney Selous, executed for the Art Union of London, 1844.
