= Rita Schober =

German scholar of Romance studies and literature

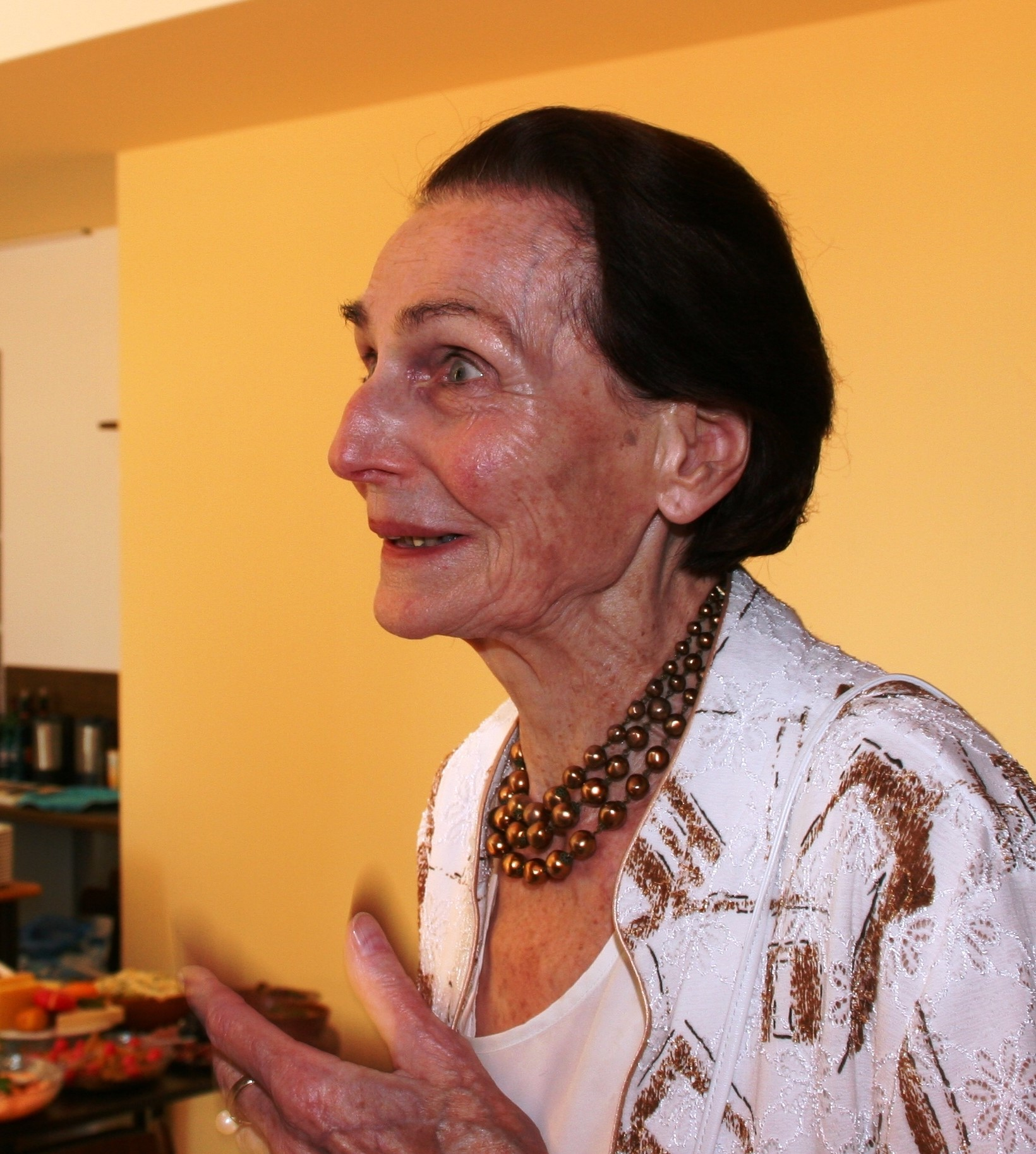
- Born: Rita Tomaschek; 13 June 1918; Rumburg, Bohemia, Austro-Hungarian Empire
- Died: 26 December 2012 (aged 94); Berlin-Pankow Germany
- Education: Prague; Halle
- Occupations: Romance studies scholar University teacher and administrator
- Employer(s): University of Halle; Humboldt University of Berlin
- Spouses: Hans Hetzer (m. 1940; died 1943) Robert Schober (m. 1950; died 1994)
- Children: Hans-Robert Schober (1952–2011)

Rita Schober (née Tomaschek; 13 June 1918 – 26 December 2012) was a German scholar of Romance studies and literature.

== Early life and education ==
Rita Tomaschek was born and grew up in Rumburg (as Rumburk was then known), a small manufacturing town near the northern tip of Bohemia, in what was at that time part of the Austro-Hungarian Empire. The town was overwhelmingly ethnically and linguistically German. (It became predominantly Czechoslovak after 1945.) Her father was a clerical worker. Her mother worked in garment manufacturing. Between 1928 and 1936 Rita Tomaschek attended the secondary school (Realgymnasium) in Rumburg, before moving on to study at the German University in Prague between 1938 and 1940, and then again during 1944/45. As a child her longstanding ambition was to become a school teacher, but after she moved to Prague she modified this goal, setting her sights instead on a career in the universities sector. The focus of her undergraduate university career was on Romance studies and Classical Philology. According to one source she was obliged to combine study with paid employment since otherwise there were no family funds available to finance her university education. It was presumably also to the pressures arising from the war her student career was not unbroken.

== Career ==
The needs of the military and the slaughter of war created a desperate shortage of teachers: between October 1940 and 1943, and again from December 1944 till December 1945, she worked as an assistant Latin teacher at a secondary school (Gymnasium) in Warnsdorf, near her parents' home. One of the children whom she taught was Peter H. Feist (1928 – 2015) who later became a distinguished East German art historian.

By the summer of 1945 Rita Hetzer, now aged 27, was a widow. She had married Hans Hetzer, another art historian, in 1940, but he had gone missing in 1943 and was presumed to have been killed while taking part at the Battle of Stalingrad. In March of that year she had received her doctorate from Prague University. The discipline was Linguistics and her dissertation concerned the suffix "-age" in the French language. The work was supervised by Erhard Preißig who surprised and delighted her early in 1945 by offering her an academic job, working for him. The opportunity to embark on a university career at a time like this represented a dream come true. Unfortunately, however, Erhard Preißig died in Prague a few months later. In any case, the post–war ethnic cleansing made it impossible for ethnic Germans to stay in newly liberated Czechoslovakia. Like tens of thousands of others, Rita Hetzer emigrated.

With her mother, she settled in Halle in 1946, where she took a post as a research assistant with the Romance studies department, which she now helped to re-establish at the university. Halle had ended the war administered as part of the Soviet occupation zone (to be relaunched in October 1949 as the Soviet sponsored German Democratic Republic ("East Germany")). In 1947 her responsibilities expanded to include a teaching position in Old French and Old Provençal. She later explained that had made a conscious decision, when forced to flee to Germany, to settle in the Soviet occupation zone rather than in one of the three "western" zones administered by the British, the Americans and the French, because she anticipated a more rapid Denazification process under the Soviet administrators. During the chaotic closing chapter of the war she had indeed joined the Communist Party in Prague, shortly before leaving the country. During 1946 she had been one of tens of thousands of early joiners of the new Socialist Unity Party ("Sozialistische Einheitspartei Deutschlands" / SED), created under contentious circumstances during April of that year. Between 1949 and 1989 the SED would be the ruling party in a new kind of German one party dictatorship, operated according to the Leninist precepts developed in the Soviet Union during the 1920s and 1930s. Schober would later recall that between 1946 and 1948 she was employed as a research assistant in a university department without its own head. That changed in 1948 with the arrival of Victor Klemperer, a noted scholar of Romance languages, who took on the leadership of the Romance Studies Institute at the University of Halle. Under Klemperer's leadership she also became a dean of studies in 1949 and began work on her Habilitation project which concerned the popular nineteenth-century French novelist George Sand.

During 1951/52, she obtained an important government advisory role (Hauptreferentin) on languages teaching to the Department for Higher and Technical Education ("Staatssekretariat für Hochschulwesen"). During 1951/1952 Schober transferred with her mentor from Halle to the Humboldt University of Berlin where she took a professorship and a teaching post. Klemperer was by now well past the conventional retirement age, and it was evident that Rita Schober was being prepared to take over from him as head of the university Institute for Romance studies. Meanwhile, her habilitation of George Sand was deferred and then abandoned. She had found no complete collection of the author's work and certainly, in her words, no "scholarly" complete collection ("...keine wissenschaftliche Ausgabe "). She had married Robert Schober in 1950 and the birth of Hans-Robert Schober (1951–2012) diverted her energies. At the professional level, by the time the move from Halle to Berlin had been competed she had been introduced to François Zola, Emile Zola's son, who at that point was still alive, through the mediation of the energetic "Zola specialist", Henri Mitterand. When Rita Schober finally completed her habilitation, her subject would be not George Sand but Emile Zola.

Another reason that she had no time to complete her habilitation on George Sand was the offer she received in 1952 from the Potsdam-based publishing firm of Rütten & Loenning to take charge of a major translation exercise involving Emile Zola's twenty novel Rougon-Macquart cycle. Although a literary giant in his native France and well-studied by readers and scholars in the English-speaking world, Zola had till this point been little known in Germany during the first half of the twentieth century, and the Rütten & Loenning, most of it completely newly translated, was the first post-war German language set of the works. In East Germany the government had unwittingly inherited some of the literary tendencies of the Hitler years, and Zola's work was condemned in some official circles as "Gossenliteratur" ("Gutter literature") which should not be permitted to fall into the hands of the people for fear of poisoning their minds. Nevertheless, the massive project was permitted to progress, and between 1952 and the later 1976 (when the Rougon-Macquart translation project was completed), teaching and promoting Emile Zola's writings became the centre-piece of Rita Schober's academic life. In 1974 - unusually for an East German publishing venture - the newly translated series was even sold to West Germany where, as in the east, Zola had hitherto been neglected in academic circles, and where, by this stage, Romance studies in general had become a mainstream discipline to an extent that would not be matched in East Germany till after1989.

Rita Schober finally received her Habilitation in 1954 for a piece of work entitled "Emile Zolas Theorie des naturalistischen Romans und das Problem des Realismus" ("Emile Zola's Theory of the Naturalistic Novel and the Problem of Realism"). Her habilitation was naturally supervised by Victor Klemperer. In political terms, a twentieth century highly political novelist naturally represented a more risky topic than an eighteenth century popular novelist, but in keeping with the Marxist approach which was mainstream in East Germany and to which, as a committed communist, she adhered, she was able to demonstrate without too much difficulty Zola's hostility to the "Haute-bourgeois society" which provided the context for Zola's socially critical novels.

In 1959, Schober finally took over from her friend and boss Viktor Klemperer as director of the Institute for Romance Stundies at the Humboldt University of Berlin, a post she would retain till her retirement in 1978. During this period she also served, between 1969 and 1975 as dean of the faculty of social sciences at the Humboldt. In she was elected to full membership of the (East) German Academy of Sciences and Humanities ("Deutsche Akademie der Wissenschaften zu Berlin").

As she built her career during the early years of the German Democratic Republic, Rita Schober was acutely aware of her own skills deficit in respect of the French languagem which could only be addressed by forging links with mother-tongue French speakers. Due to the political division of post-war Europe, her first visit to France took place only in May 1953. She was only ever permitted one "private exchange", to France, which took place in 1954/55. There were, however, one or two French mother-tongue speakers in East Germany, even during those early years, who could be employed to teach the language. She was, however, able to travel to several international conferences in the company of Victor Klemperer during the 1950s, with respect to countries that were allied to East Germany, and in this respect she acquired an international profile in academic circles. She was evidently regarded by the East German authorities as politically reliable, and her leadership role in the Rougon-Macquart cycle also necessitated international contacts with specialist literary academics in France. In 1974 she was appointed by her government to membership of the UNESCO executive council. In 1975 she became chair of the "National Academy for Literature" ("Nationalkomitees für Literaturwissenschaft") at the Academy of Sciences and Humanities and served between 1980 and 1990 as a member of the presidium of the (East German) national PEN Centre. She retired from her fulltime university role in 1978 but entered into a contract with the university whereby she continued with her teaching and research work till 1989, also retaining a high-level role with regard to academic and personnel policy at the university's Institute for Romance studies. By this time, with political tensions between East and West Germany becoming less acute in the aftermath of Chancellor Brandt's bridge-building policy, "Red Rita" was also increasingly present as a participant at international academic conferences on Romance Studies in western venues.

Although sources tend in the first instance to concentrate on Rita Schober's contribution to the study of Zola, she was in fact deeply knowledgeable about a wide range of French authors from different period, notably Nicolas Boileau, Louis Aragon and Michel Houellebecq. She was also well respected for her work on theories of literature, especially structuralism.
