= Christian Leberecht Vogel =

German painter (1759–1816)

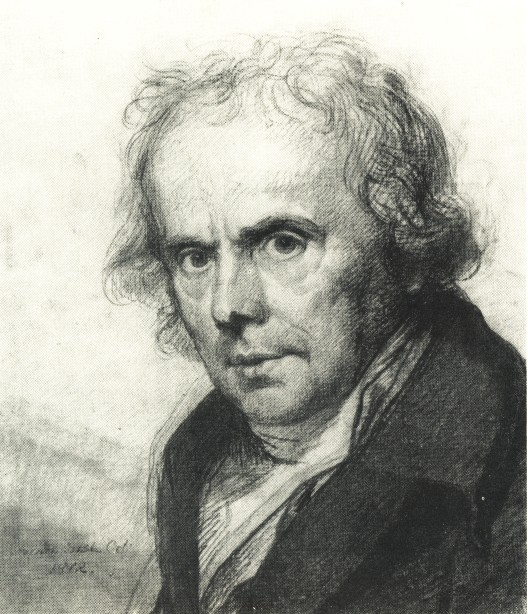
Portrait of Christian Leberecht Vogel by his son, Carl Christian Vogel von Vogelstein

Christian Leberecht Vogel (6 April 1759 – 11 April 1816) was a German painter, draughtsman and writer on art theory. His pupils included Louise Seidler, and he was the father of court painter and art professor Carl Christian Vogel.

== Life ==
Vogel was born and died in Dresden. A family history, written circa 1914 by his grandson, Victor Vogel, says:

Christian Leberecht Vogel [was] born in 1750. He became a painter of some renown, was Professor at the Academy of fine Arts at Dresden Saxony Germany. Moved to Waldenfels, a few miles from Lichtenstein. His first great painting was the Alter Painting at the Church of Lichtenstein, 'Suffer the little children to come to unto me and hinder them not for such is the kingdom of God'. Which is still intact today [in 1914]. Thirty years later he repeated the same painting for the Duke of Schoenberg at his Castle in Wildenfels. He lived at Wildenfels from 1780 till 1804. He died in 1816 at the age of sixty-six.

== Work ==
"Amor and Psyche"

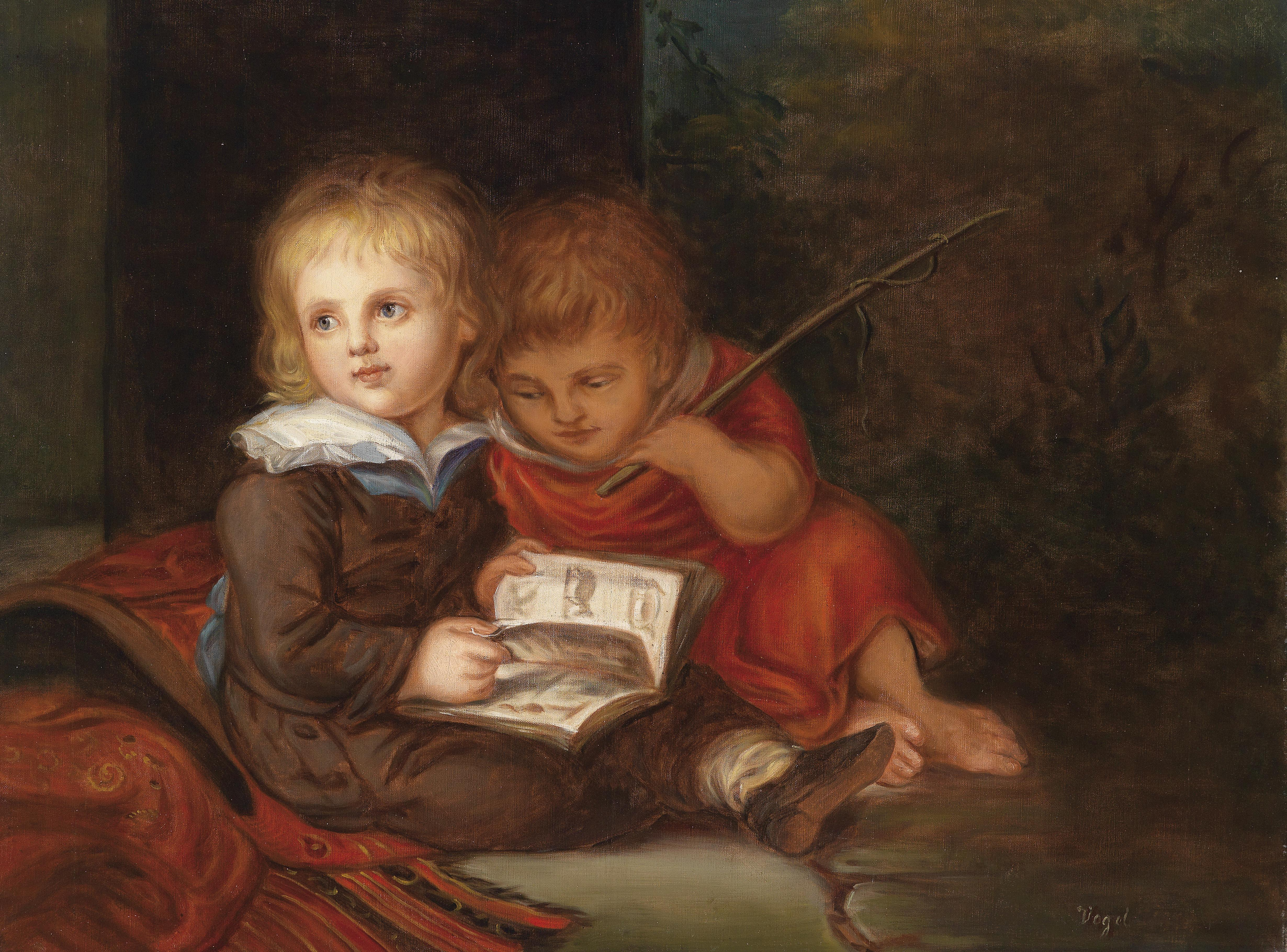
The Artist's Sons (circa 1793)

- Ganymed
- Boy with Birdcage
- Boy with Canary bird, which is at the Royal Picture Gallery at Dresden.
- The Artist's Sons
- A group of Hessian soldiers in 1776 when he was 26, going to help the British fight the Americans. At the time this was a prize possession of the author Victor Vogel circa 1914.
- Ideen über die Schönheitslehre in Hinsicht auf sichtbare Gegenstände überhaupt und auf bildende Kunst insbesondere., Dresden 1812
- Reflexionen über die Form und örtlichen Verhältnisse der Helligkeit und Dunkelheit der umgebenden Materie der Kometen ..., Dresden 1812
- Ideen zur Farbenlehre (handschriftlicher Entwurf), abgedruckt in: Hermann Vogel von Vogelstein, Die Farbenlehre des Christian Leberecht Vogel, Dissertation Greifswald 1998

== Bibliography ==
Some info from Brockhaus Lexicon Vol. 16 page 368

- Gerd-Helge Vogel: Hermann Vogel von Vogelstein; Christian Leberecht Vogel, Künstlermonographie. Leipzig 2006.
- Gerd-Helge Vogel: Kunst und Kultur um 1800 im Zwickauer Muldenland. Zwickau 1996.
- Gerd-Helge Vogel: Alchimie des Glücks – Christian Leberecht Vogel als Plafondmaler und Buchillustrator und seine Verbindung zur Freimaurerei. In: Sächsische Heimatblätter 4/2005, pp. 324–348.
- Thieme-Becker Vol. 34, 1940, p. 477.
