= Peter Betthausen =

German art historian (1941-2025)

- Born: 27 June 1941; Harzgerode, Anhalt, Germany
- Died: 24 July 2025 (aged 84); Berlin, Germany
- Occupation: art historian

Peter Betthausen (27 June 1941 – 24 July 2025) was a German art historian.

== Life ==
Born in Harzgerode, in Anhalt, Germany, Betthausen studied history of art, history and aesthetic at the Humboldt University of Berlin. From 1966 to 1986 he worked there and at the Leipzig University. In 1971 he received his doctorate at the University of Berlin with a thesis on Hypothesen zu einer kunstwissenschaftlichen Stiltheorie (Hypotheses on a theory of style in art studies) and in 1986 he habilitated on Künstlergemeinschaften der deutschen Romantik (Artist communities of German Romanticism). From 1974 to 1986 he was also a member of staff at the Institute for Aesthetics and Art Studies at the Academy of Sciences of the GDR. From 1986 he was director of the National Gallery of the GDR. During his term of office, which lasted until January 1991, he showed a series of exhibitions on artists of the 19th and 20th centuries, including Wolfgang Mattheuer, Wilhelm Lehmbruck, Werner Tübke, Gerhard Altenbourg and Bernhard Heisig. In addition, he organized exhibitions from the holdings of the National Gallery in Vienna and various locations in the United States. Later Betthausen worked as a freelance art historian in Berlin. In his numerous publications, he devoted himself mainly to the art of the 19th century and the history of art historiography.

== Publications ==
- Anton Graff. Verlag der Kunst, Dresden 1973.
- Arnold Böcklin. Verlag der Kunst, Dresden 1975.
- Studien zur deutschen Kunst und Architektur um 1800. publisher Verlag der Kunst, Dresden 1981.
- Karl Friedrich Schinkel, Henschelverlag Kunst und Gesellschaft, Berlin 1983.
- Schinkelmuseum Friedrichswerdersche Kirche. together with Brigitte Schmitz and Bernhard Maaz, Staatliche Museen zu Berlin, Nationalgalerie, Berlin 1989.
- Die Präraffaeliten, Henschel, Berlin 1989, ISBN 3-362-00392-3.
- Von Caspar David Friedrich bis Adolph Menzel: Aquarelle und Zeichnungen der Romantik aus der Nationalgalerie Berlin/DDR. together with Gottfried Riemann and Klaus Albrecht Schröder, Prestel, Munich 1990, ISBN 978-3-7913-1047-3.
- Die Museumsinsel zu Berlin, Henschel, Berlin 1990, ISBN 978-3-362-00275-2.
- Jacob Burckhardt und die Antike. Published together with Max Kunze, von Zabern, Mainz 1998, ISBN 978-3-8053-2514-1.
- Wiedergeburt griechischer Götter und Helden, Homer in der Kunst der Goethezeit. Published together with Max Kunze, von Zabern, Mainz 1999, ISBN 978-3-8053-2596-7.
- Metzler-Kunsthistoriker-Lexikon, zweihundert Porträts deutschsprachiger Autoren aus vier Jahrhunderten, together with Peter H. Feist and Christiane Fork, Metzler, Stuttgart und Weimar 1999, ISBN 978-3-476-01535-8.
- H. O. Gehrcke: 1896–1988, ein Malerleben an der Havel. Stiftung Preußische Schlösser und Gärten Berlin-Brandenburg, Berlin 1999.
- Friedrich Wilhelm IV. von Preussen, Briefe aus Italien 1828, Herausgeber, Deutscher Kunstverlag, München und Berlin 2001, ISBN 978-3-422-06333-4.
- Antike in Wien: die Akademie und der Klassizismus um 1800, together with Bettina Hagen and Max Kunze, von Zabern, Mainz 2002, ISBN 978-3-8053-3065-7.
- Augen unterwegs …, Reisebilder, Aquarelle und Zeichnungen von Georg Dehio, together with Peter H. Feist and Axel Rügler, Rutzen, Ruhpolding 2005, ISBN 3-938646-00-4.
- Georg Dehio, ein deutscher Kunsthistoriker, Deutscher Kunstverlag, Munich 2004, ISBN 3-422-06399-4.
- Ronald Paris – Lob des Realismus, published together with Ulrike Hager and Peter H. Feist, Faber & Faber, Leipzig 2008, ISBN 978-3-86730-063-6.
- Philipp Otto Runge – Briefwechsel, publisher Seemann, Leipzig 2010, ISBN 978-3-86502-242-4.
- Kunst in Preußen – preußische Kunst?. Published together with Frank-Lothar Kroll, Duncker & Humblot, Berlin 2016, ISBN 978-3-428-14863-9.

== Literature ==
- Peter-Klaus Schuster (ed.): Die Nationalgalerie. DuMont, 2001, ISBN 978-3-8321-7004-2.
