= American immigration to Canada =

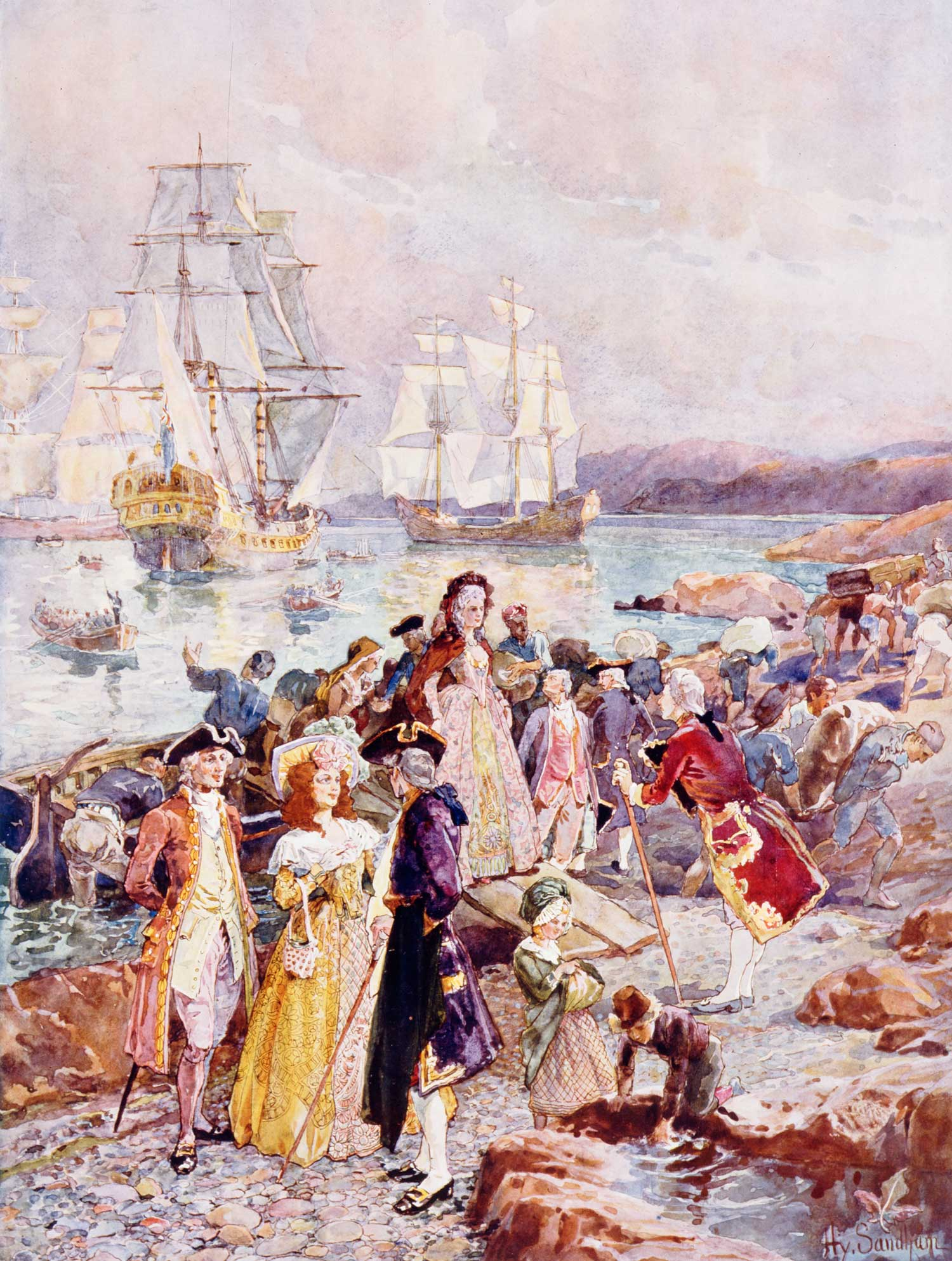
Landing of the Loyalists in Canada

American immigration to Canada was a notable part of the social history of Canada. Over Canada's history various refugees and economic migrants from the United States would immigrate to Canada for a variety of reasons. Exiled Loyalists from the United States first came, followed by African-American refugees (fugitive slaves), economic migrants, and later draft evaders from the Vietnam War.

== History ==
=== Expulsion of the Loyalists ===
During and after the American Revolution various loyalists became exiles from the newly forming United States. It's been estimated that a total of 60,000 white settlers left the new United States. The majority, around 33,000 went to New Brunswick and Nova Scotia, another 6,600 went to Quebec, and 2,000 to Prince Edward Island. Others went to Florida and Great Britain. A recent study increases the estimate to the traditional figure of 100,000.

Canadian authorities believed that English loyalists and French Canadians could not co-exist. Governor Haldimand (at the suggestion of Carleton) brought Loyalists away from Quebec City and Montreal by offering free land on the northern shore of Lake Ontario to anyone who would swear allegiance to George III. The Loyalists were thus given land grants of 200 acres (81 ha) per person. This was done with the intent of keeping French and English as far apart as possible. Soon after the separation of the Province of Quebec, Lower Canada and Upper Canada were formed, each with its own government.

=== "Black Refugees" ===
After the War of 1812 a total of about 4000 Africans had escaped to the British through the Royal Navy. This would be the largest emancipation of African Americans prior to the American Civil War. Of those that escaped to Canada, about 2000 settled in Nova Scotia and about 400 settled in New Brunswick. Together they were the largest single source of African-American immigrants, whose descendants formed the core of African Canadians.

=== Underground Railroad ===
Within the underground railroad, many escaped slaves desired to go to British North America (today's Canada), since its long border made it easy to flee to, it was further from slave catchers, and not under the rule of the U.S. Fugitive Slave Acts. Most escaped slaves, reaching Canada by boat across Lake Erie and Lake Ontario, settled in Ontario. More than 30,000 people were said to have escaped there via the network during its 20-year peak period, although U.S. Census figures account for only 6,000.

=== Klondike Gold Rush ===
During the Klondike Gold Rush an estimated 100,000 people tried to reach the Klondike goldfields, of whom only around 30,000 to 40,000 eventually did. (Note: The initial broad estimates of the numbers involved in the stampede were produced by Pierre Berton, the classic secondary historian of the period, drawing on a number of sources, including the NWMP statistics generated along the trails. The most recent academic work continues to accept these estimates, but further detailed analysis has been carried out, using the first, limited Yukon census by the NWMP that occurred in 1898 and the more detailed Federal census in 1901. Historian Charlene Porsild has conducted extensive work on these records, comparing them to other documentary accounts of the period. This has generated improved statistics for the nationality and gender of those involved in the gold rush.) The prospectors came from many nations, although an estimated majority of 60 to 80 percent were Americans or recent immigrants to America. (Note: Traditional historical analysis, as outlined by George Fetherling, has suggested around 80 percent were US citizens or recent immigrants to America. The 1898 census data suggests that 63 percent of Dawson City inhabitants at the time were American citizens, with 32 percent Canadian or British. As Charlene Porsild has described, however, the census data for the period is inconsistent in how it asked questions about citizenship and place of birth. Porsild argues that the level of participation from those born in the US, as opposed to recent immigrants or temporary residents, may have been as low as 43 percent, with Canadian and British born members of the gold rush in the majority.)

=== Immigration to West Canada ===
After the settling of the American West a lot of land in Western Canada remained for sale. Between 1905 and 1923 around 330,000 came from the United States to Saskatchewan. These immigrants included native-born Americans and immigrants to America who first tried to settle in America. Between 1908 and 1911 over 1000 African Americans in Oklahoma would decide to come to west Canada, motivated by a distaste for American Jim Crow laws and the economic prospects of land in west Canada.

=== Vietnam War resisters ===
Canadian historian Jessica Squires states that draft evaders coming to Canada were "only a fraction" of those who resisted the Vietnam War. According to a 1978 book by former members of President Gerald Ford's Clemency Board, 210,000 Americans were accused of draft offenses and 30,000 left the country. More recently, peace studies researcher David Cortright estimated that 60,000 to 100,000 left the U.S., mainly for Canada or Sweden.

== See also ==
- American entry into Canada by land
- American immigration to Mexico
