= Carl Christian Vogel von Vogelstein =

German painter (1788–1868)

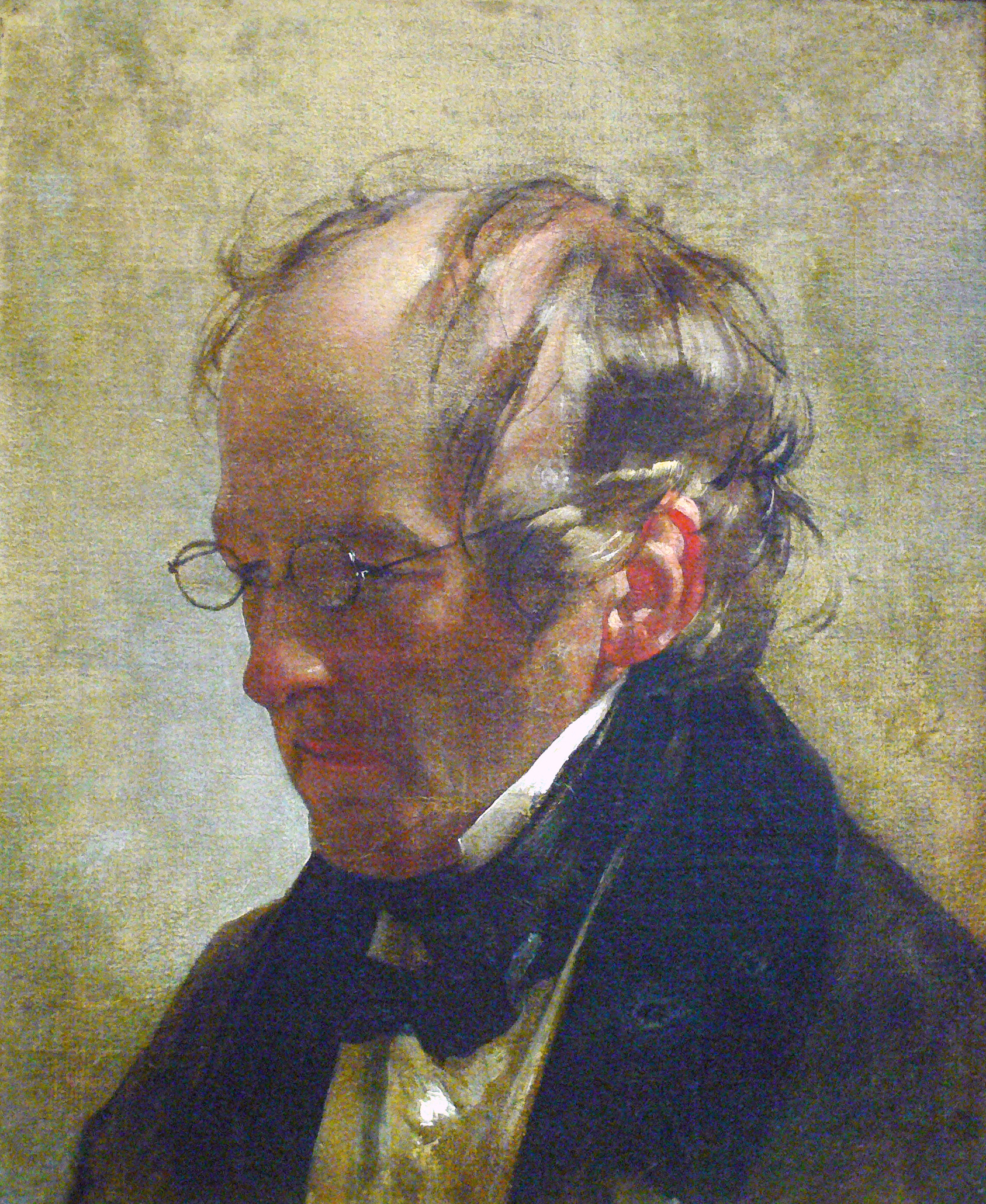
1837 portrait of Vogel von Vogelstein by Friedrich von Amerling

Carl Christian Vogel von Vogelstein (born Carl Christian Vogel; 26 June 1788 – 4 March 1868) was a German painter who specialised in portrait painting.

== Life ==
Son of the child and portrait painter Christian Leberecht Vogel, Vogel was trained early in life by his father. From 1804 he visited the Kunstakademie in Dresden, where he copied many paintings in the Gemäldegalerie and also produced the first of his own portraits.

In 1807 he replied to an invitation from Baron von Löwenstern, whose children he had taught in Dresden, to come to Dorpat in Livonia. In 1808 he moved to Saint Petersburg, where he set up a studio and became a successful painter of portraits of nobles and diplomats.

In 1812 Vogel had become sufficiently wealthy to make a long-desired grand tour to Italy, stopping off at Berlin and Dresden on the way, where he painted his parents and Franz Pettrich. From 1813 to 1820 he lived in Rome, where many German artists were active at that time. He tried to run a middle course between the classicising and romanticising schools then prevailing there, with a style of his own closely drawing on that of Raphael Mengs. In Italy he copied a large number of paintings and wall paintings by the old masters. On later journeys he further augmented his collection of copies and in 1860 published a catalogue of them.

Besides religious paintings, landscapes and anatomical studies, Vogel also produced portraits in Rome, of subjects such as Bertel Thorvaldsen, Lucien Bonaparte and – on behalf of the king of Saxony - Pope Pius VII. Vogel much enjoyed Rome, as Ringseis illustrates by this story - in 1818 he received a gift of a bottle of 1634 Rheinwein wine (given by crown prince Louis I of Bavaria in thanks for the decoration of a festal hall) by unanimous resolution of his colleagues

== Marriage and issue ==
In 1826 Vogel married Julie Gensiken, a daughter of the writer Wilhelmine Gensicken. His wife died on 14 April 1828. Vogel's only child was Johannes Arnolf Leo Vogel von Vogelstein (1827–1889), Dr. jur., K. b. BezGerAss. a.D.

== Works ==
- Verzeichnis der in den Jahren 1814 bis 1857 in Italien von C. Vogel v. V. teils selbst gemachten, teils gesammelten Abzeichnungen und Durchzeichnungen nach altitalienischen Meistern. München 1860
- Die Hauptmomente von Goethe's Faust, Dante's Divina Commedia und Virgil's Aeneïs. Bildlich darstellt und nach ihrem innern Zusammenhange erläutert. Fleischmann, München 1861
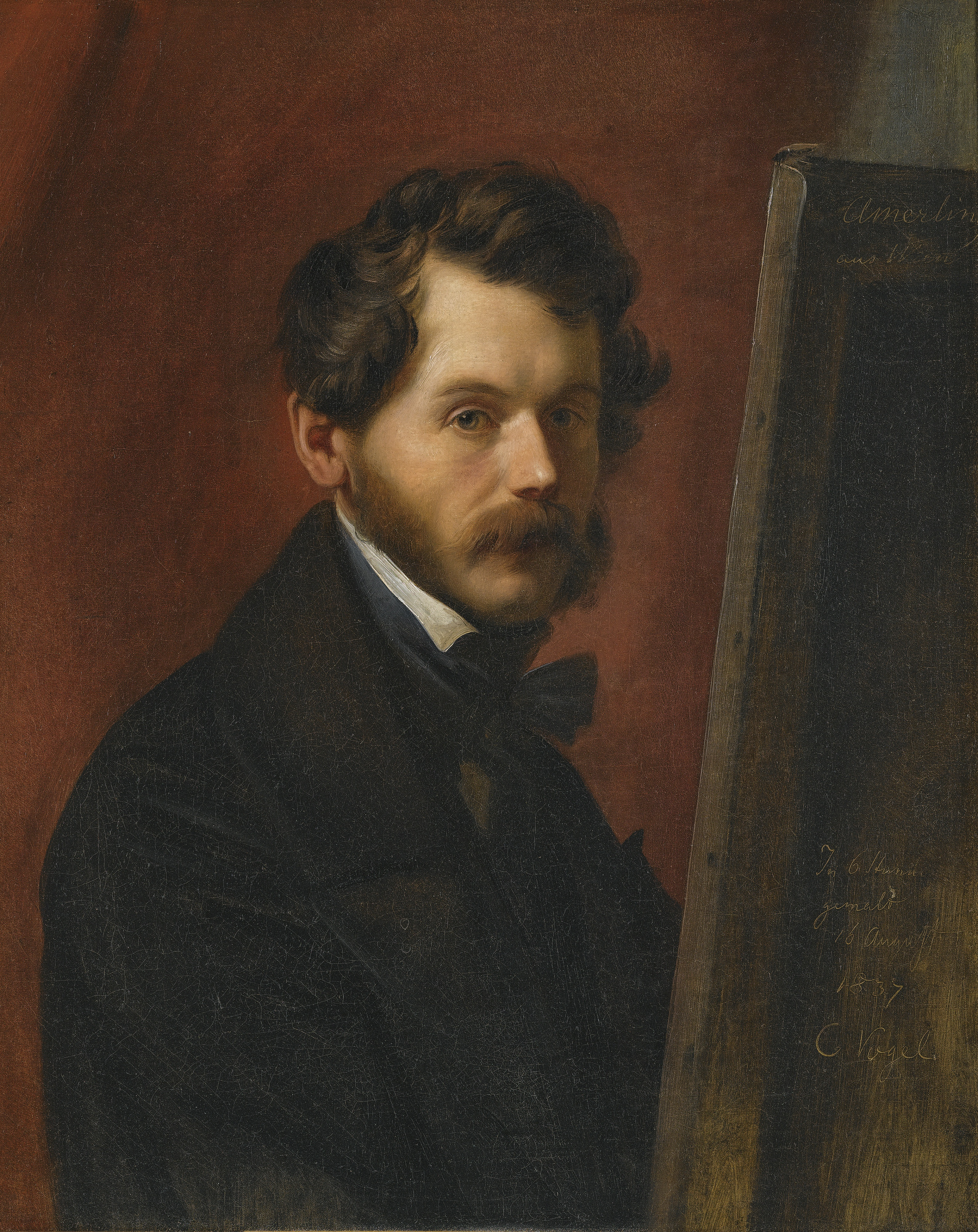
Portrait of Friedrich von Amerling (1837)

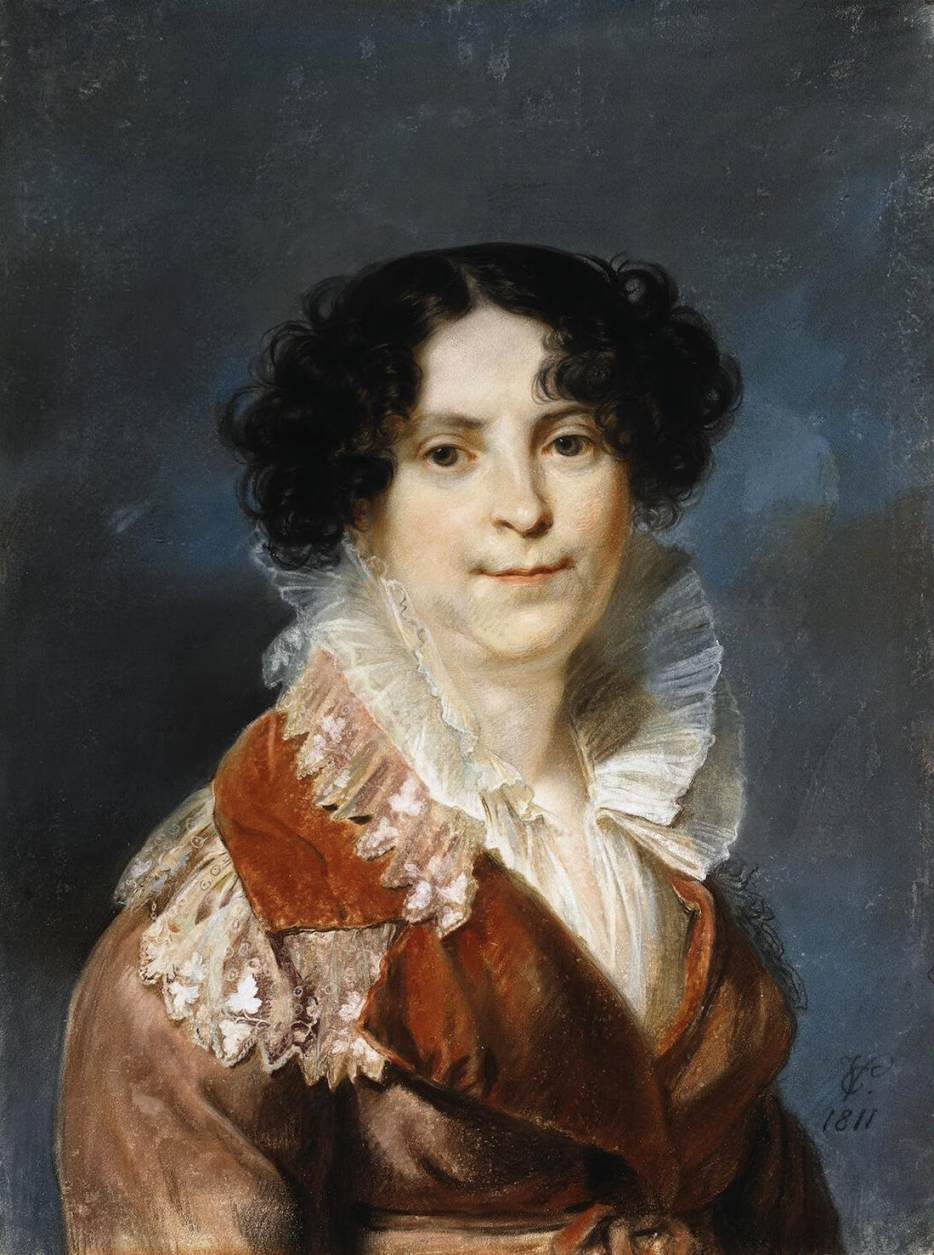
Portrait of a Lady (1811)

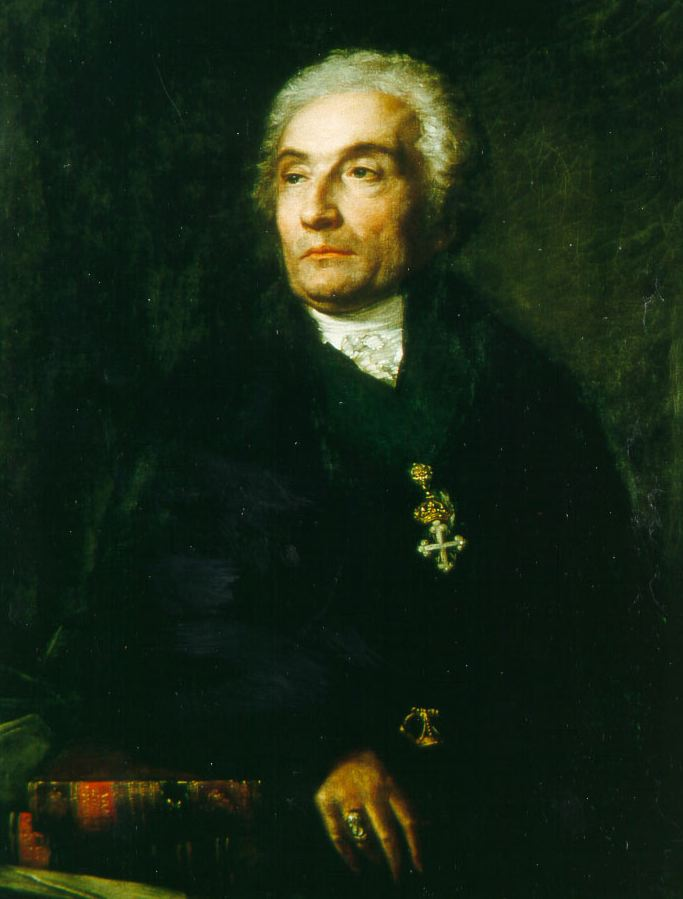
Portrait of Joseph de Maistre, (1810)

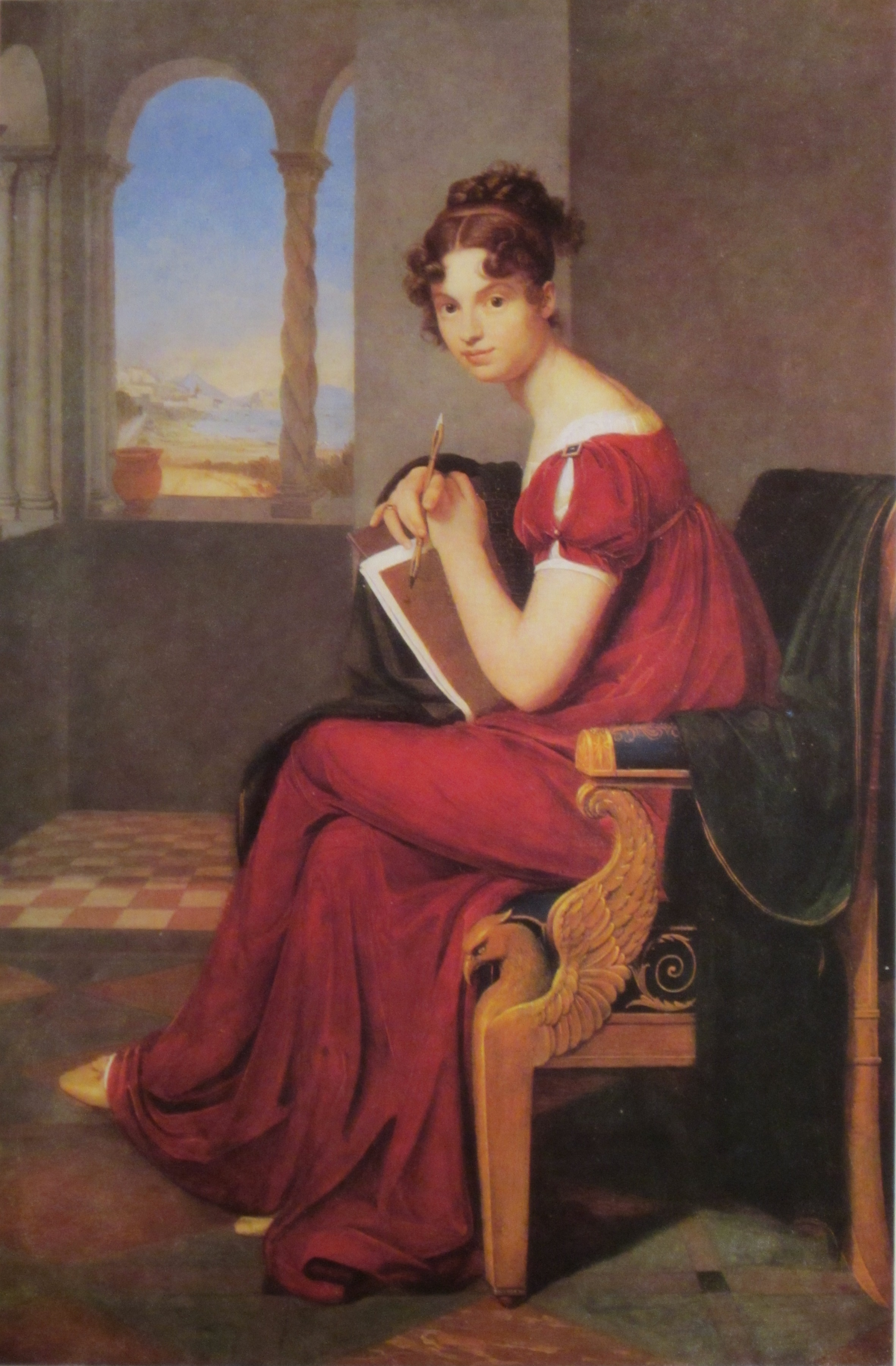
Young Lady with Drawing Pad (1816)

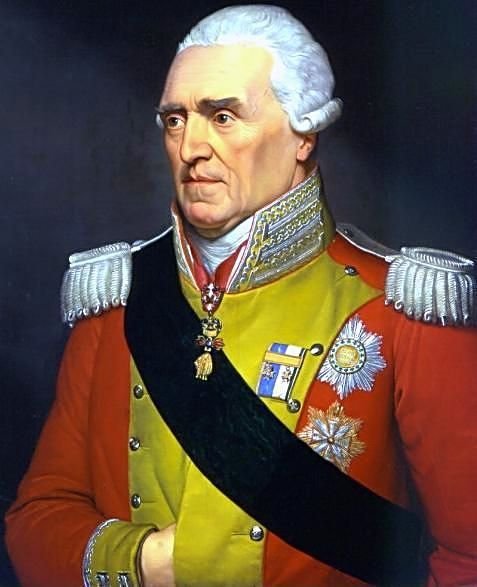
King Frederick Augustus I of Saxony (1823)

== Bibliography ==
- Hyacinth Holland (1896). "Vogel von Vogelstein, Karl Christian". Allgemeine Deutsche Biographie (in German). Vol. 40. Leipzig: Duncker & Humblot. pp. 135–139.
- Rainer G. Richter: Carl Christian Vogel von Vogelstein - Ein Nazarener in Sachsen in: Jahrbuch der Staatlichen Kunstsammlungen Dresden, Bd. 15, Dresden 1983
- Rainer G. Richter: Sein letzter Aufenthalt war in Dresden-Joseph Rebell zum 200. Geburtstag in: Sächsische Heimatblätter, Zeitschrift für sächsische Geschichte, Denkmalpflege Natur und Umwelt, Heft 2/1988, pp. 61–63
- Rainer G. Richter: Carl Christian Vogel von Vogelstein. Eine Ausstellung zum 200. Geburtstag. Staatl. Kunstsammlungen, Gemäldegalerie Neue Meister, Dresden 1988
- Rainer G. Richter: Der Kunst- und Künstlerfreund Johann Gottlob von Quandt und der Maler Carl Christian Vogel von Vogelstein in: Sächsische Heimatblätter, Zeitschrift für sächsische Geschichte, Denkmalpflege Natur und Umwelt, Heft 6/2002, S. 343–355
- Gerd-Helge Vogel: Zwischen erzgebirgischem Musenhof, russischem Zarensitz und deutschrömischer Künstlerrepublik. Carl Christian Vogel (von Vogelstein) und seine Beziehungen nach Rußland. In: Anzeiger des Germanischen Nationalmuseums, Berlin und Nürnberg 2001, S. 93–122 (Zusammenfassung)
- Ina Weinrautner: Die Sammlung von Porträts von Carl Christian Vogel von Vogelstein in Dresden. Magisterarbeit der Universität Bonn, 1990
- Vogel von Vogelstein, Carl Christian. In: Thieme/Becker: Allgemeines Lexikon der Bildenden Künstler von der Antike bis zur Gegenwart. Band 34. Seemann, Leipzig 1940, S. 488–489
