= Moritz Retzsch =

German painter, draughtsman, and etcher (1779–1857)

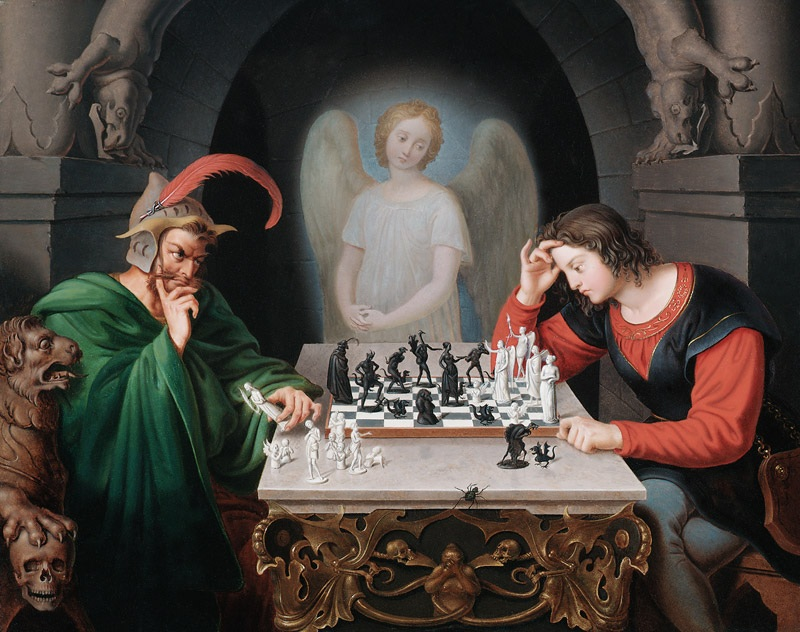
Schachmatt (checkmate)

Friedrich August Moritz Retzsch (December 9, 1779 – June 11, 1857) was a German painter, draughtsman, and etcher.

Retzsch was born in the Saxon capital Dresden. He joined the Dresden Academy of Fine Arts in 1798 under Cajetan Toscani and Józef Grassi, later working autodidactically, copying the famous pictures of the Gemäldegalerie, among them a copy of the Sixtinian Madonna. He was made a member of the Academy in 1817 and professor in 1824.

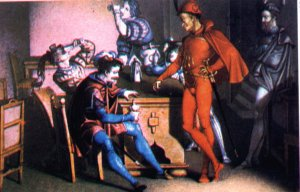
Scene from Faust

The Cotta publishing house commissioned illustrations for Johann Wolfgang Goethe's Faust (26 plates), which made him financially independent. Goethe liked his work, and he illustrated works by other famous authors, most notably Friedrich Schiller's Lied von der Glocke (43 plates), a Shakespeare Gallery (80 plates), and Bürger's Ballads (15 plates). He also did oil paintings on classical subjects, and portraits. Many of his works were created in a house in the Lößnitz, with a view of the Elbe Valley.

As a winemaker, he was a member of the Saxon wine association from 1799 onwards. Retzsch died in Oberlössnitz/Radebeul.
