= Adolf Zimmermann =

19th-century German painter

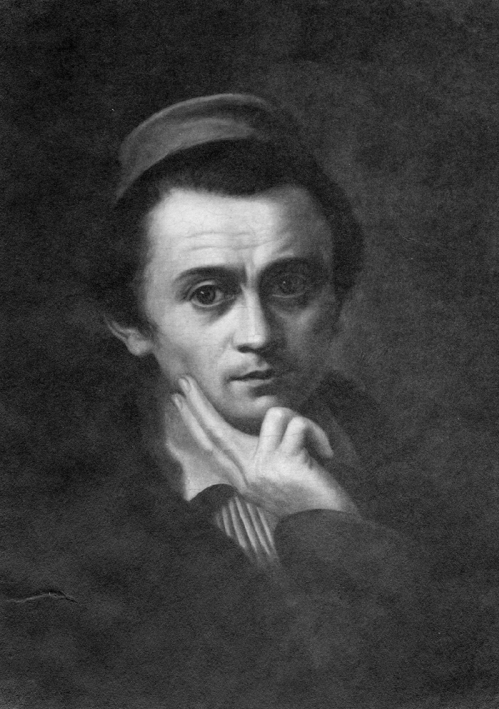
Self-portrait (1856)

Adolf Gottlob Zimmermann (1 September 1799, Lodenau, Upper Lusatia – 17 July 1859, Breslau) was a German painter. He belonged to the Düsseldorf branch of the Nazarene movement.

== Life and work ==
=== Education and early career ===
His father was a servant of Count Adolf Friedrich Abraham von Gersdorf at Schloss Lodenau, who received a plot of land in nearby Neusorge as a reward for faithful service. The Count also sponsored and provided an education for Adolf, who became a student at the Moravian Pädagogium in Niesky, where his artistic talent was encouraged. Nevertheless, he was originally destined for an apprenticeship in a craft but, perhaps at the urging of the Count's family, was able to attend the Dresden Academy of Fine Arts. From 1818 to 1825, he studied with Ferdinand Hartmann and Johann Carl Rößler.

After graduating, on the recommendation of the Academy's Director, Count Heinrich Carl Wilhelm Vitzthum von Eckstädt, he obtained a Royal Scholarship for the purpose of making a study trip to Italy. In the Fall of 1825 (following a secret marriage), he and his friend Carl Gottlieb Peschel undertook the trip, making several stops along the way to visit with other artists. He remained there until 1829.

Although he wrote to his wife that he was leaving Rome because he didn't have the financial means to remain or bring her there, it is believed that, being an Evangelical Protestant, he chose to leave due to religious disagreements with his fellow painters in the Nazarene movement, who felt that Catholicism provided a better basis for historical Bible painting.

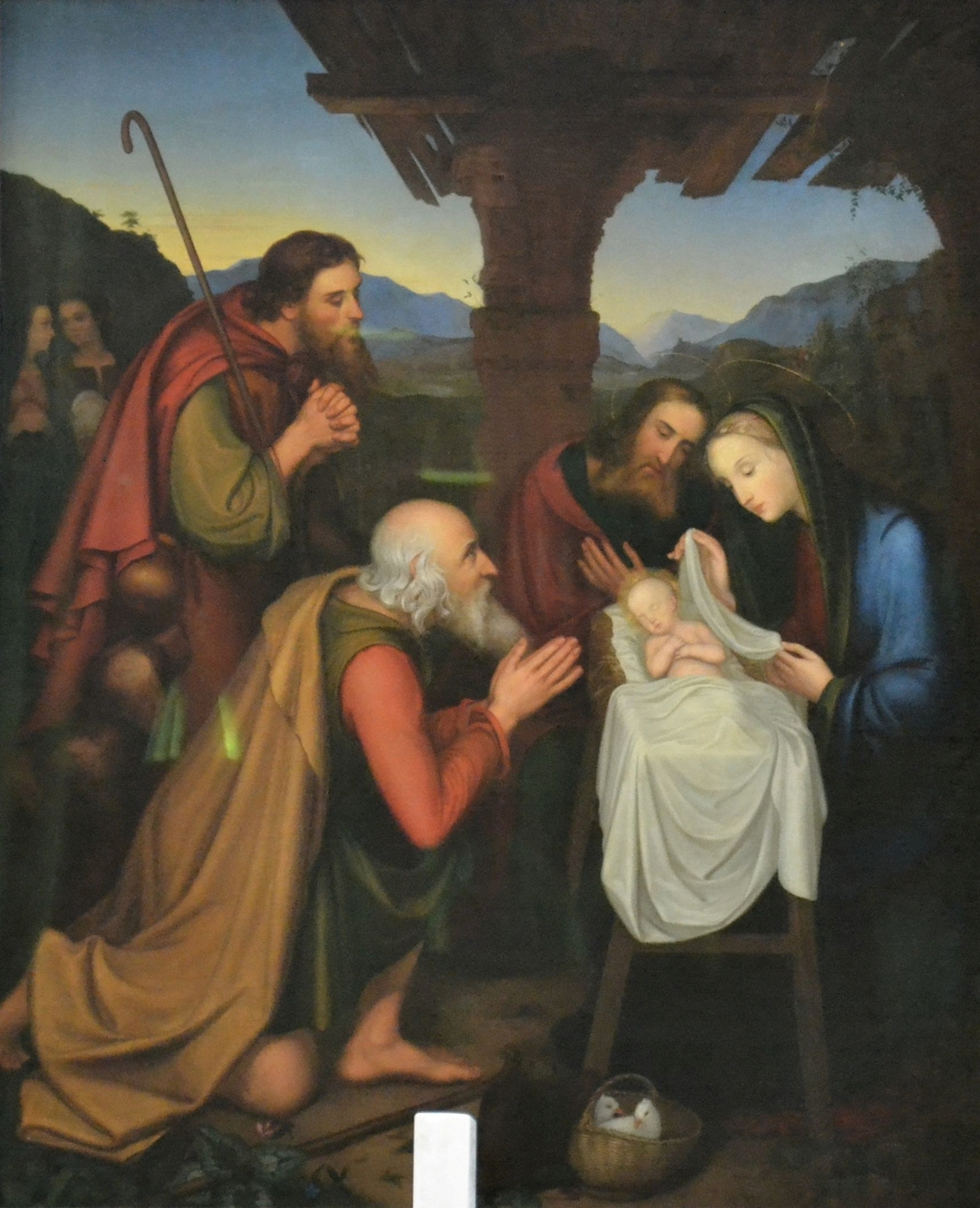
Adoration of the Shepherds, in the Friedenskirche of Essen-Steele (c. 1840)

=== Later career and decline ===
On his return, he settled in Pirna, where he taught drawing and painted portraits. His desire to paint historical and religious themes remained great however and, despite his belief that "the number of artists increases in the same proportion as the public's interest decreases", he decided to move back to Dresden in 1834. While there, he met Wilhelm von Schadow, the director of the Kunstakademie Düsseldorf. Schadow was a Romantic who wanted to encourage a return to naturalness in painting so, in 1835, Zimmermann became a teacher of "Divine Art" at the school. Once there, he became entangled in another dispute between Protestants and Catholics.

In 1837, he and his wife Amalie (who he had married against the wishes of her family), decided to marry again, publicly, so she could live with him. Their life together was, unfortunately, short as lagging sales and continued religious squabbling created financial difficulties. In 1842, she took their two boys to live at her parents' home and gave birth to a daughter there. Lonely, and in poor health since his return from Rome, Zimmermann decided to leave Düsseldorf and establish himself someplace new.

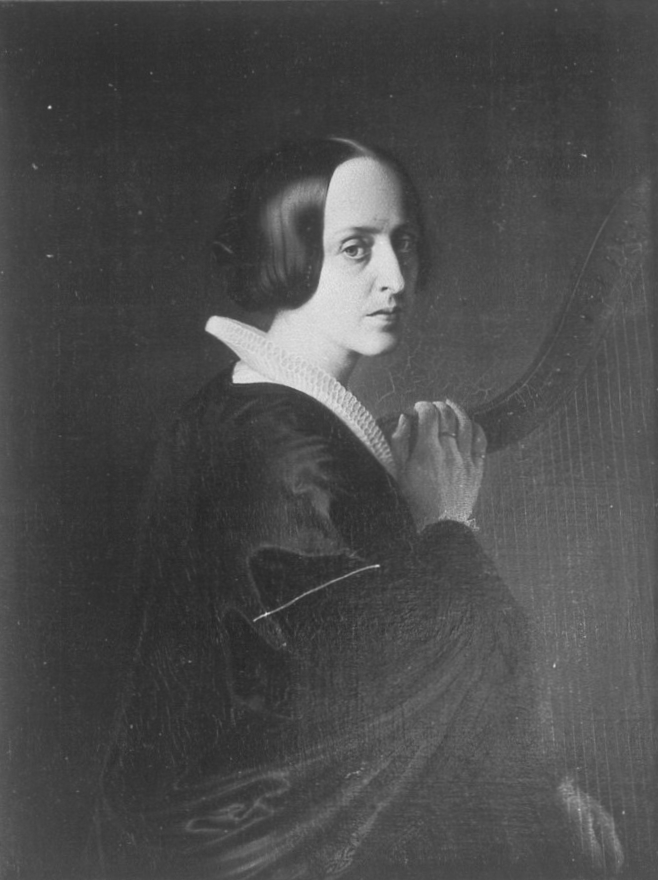
Amalie Zimmermann

The art historian Karl Schnaase recommended Breslau, as the competition with other artists would not be great. Zimmermann wrote to his former pastor in Rome, Richard Rothe, who agreed with that choice and gave him a letter of recommendation to August Hahn, a university professor. In 1846, Zimmermann retrieved his family and moved there, soon establishing a clientele that included Bishop Heinrich Förster. Most of his paintings during this period were portraits. Due to several bad harvests in the early 1850s, the members of the nobility became unwilling to pay as much for his works as they had previously. Having to pay his own way to and from the remote estates where they sat for their portraits, his profit fell rapidly.

In 1855, he began a period of noticeable decline, as his eyesight deteriorated, and he was weakened by a Cholera-like illness. Many of his friends rallied to provide support. His old patron Schnaase attempted to find him a teaching position or some form of permanent financial aid. His decline continued, however, and he died in 1859.
