= Georg Friedrich Kersting =

German painter (1785–1847)

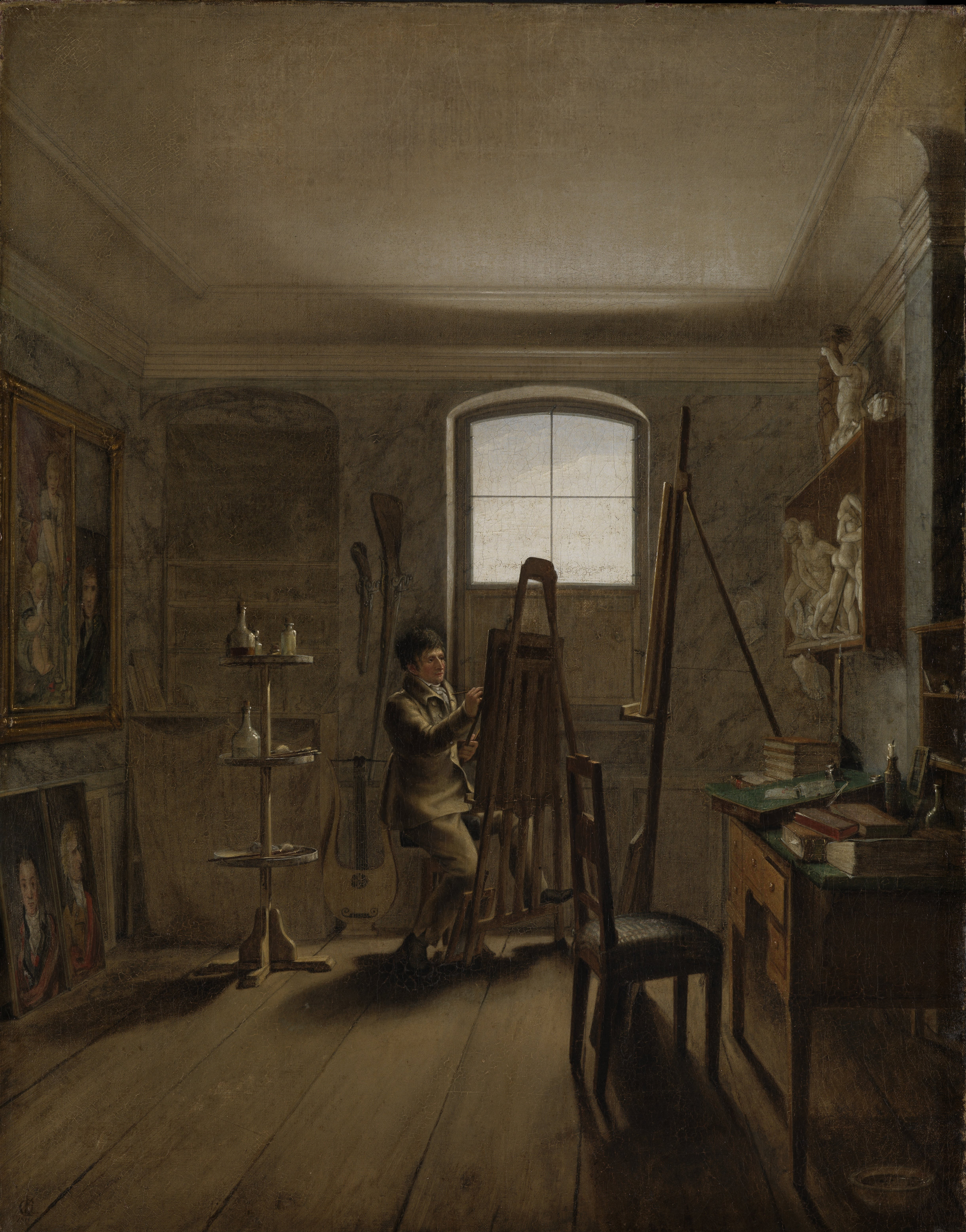
- Kersting's The Painter Gerhard von Kügelgen in his Studio, 1811
- Born: 31 October 1785
- Died: 1 July 1847 (aged 61)
- Known for: Painting
- Movement: Biedermeier

Georg Friedrich Kersting (31 October 1785 – 1 July 1847) was a German painter, best known for his Biedermeier-style interior paintings and his association with fellow artist Caspar David Friedrich.

== Biography ==
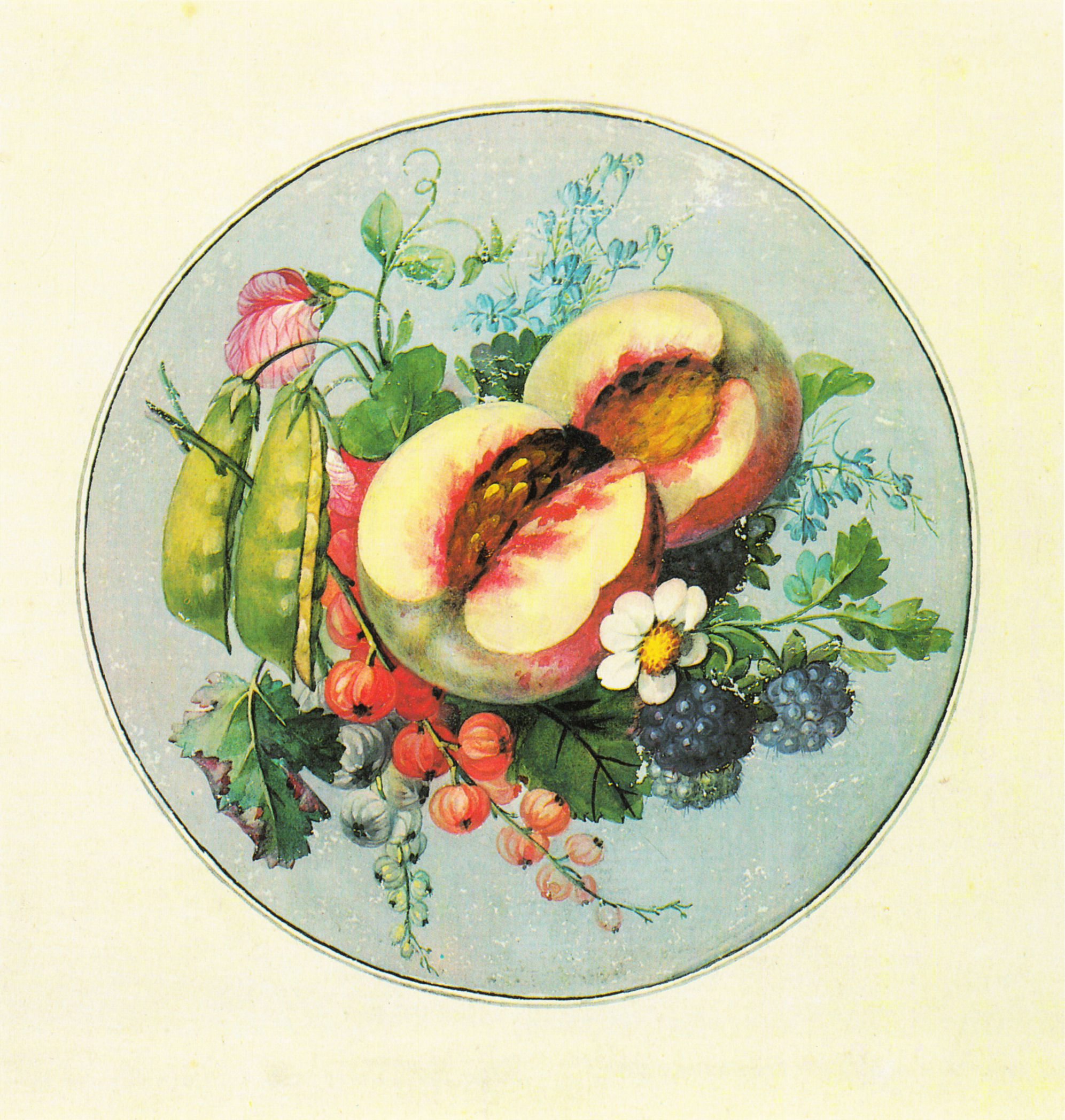
Kersting - Fruchtstücke im Kreis

Kersting came from a large and impoverished family in Güstrow, Mecklenburg-Schwerin, the son of a glazier. He studied at the progressive Copenhagen Academy between 1805 and 1808, where he adapted the visual clarity of the contemporary Danish school and was awarded a silver medal in draughtsmanship. Kersting moved to Dresden in 1808, joining the Lützow Free Corps—a voluntary force of the Prussian Army—in 1813. He moved to Poland in 1814 to work as a drawing master, and returned to Meissen in 1818, where he married and had four children. That year he became the chief artist at Meissen porcelain manufacture and remained there until life's end.

== Art and associates ==
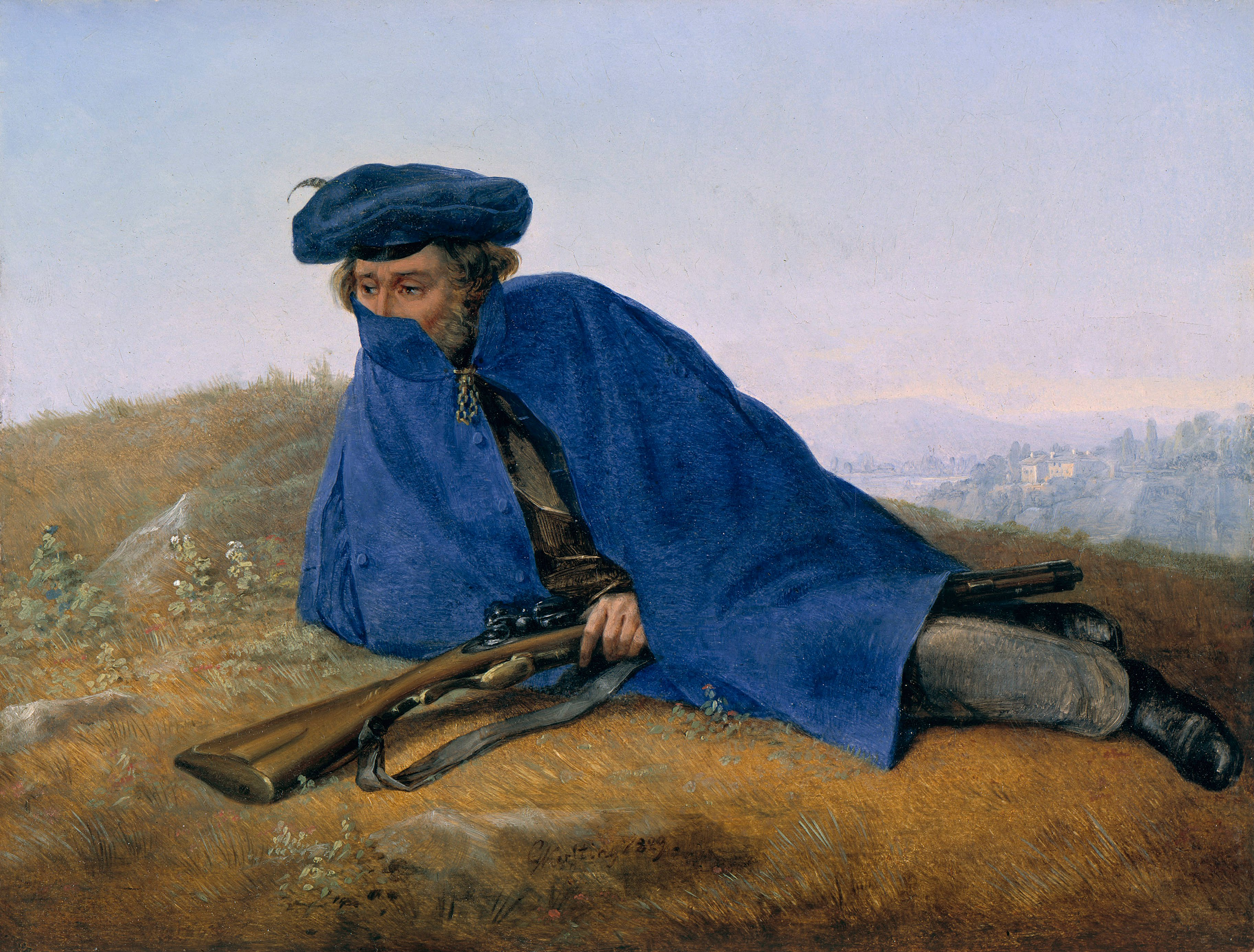
Outpost Duty, oil on panel (1829)

Kersting was a friend of Caspar David Friedrich, the leading German Romantic painter; his style was influenced by Friedrich, and he shared that artist's romantic attitude, although in a more subjective manner. The two friends went on a walking tour of the Riesengebirge in 1810. During his many hikes with Friedrich, the two painted numerous sketches and observations from nature. He may have painted the staffage in some of Friedrich's early work—such as Morning in the Riesengebirge (1810–11), a result of their walking tour.

He was also a friend of the painter Louise Seidler, who described him as "an altogether splendid and comical fellow" and often served as his model. In 1813 Seidler helped Kersting send a number of his works to Johann Wolfgang von Goethe. Goethe was impressed and recommended that the Grand Duke Charles Augustus purchase his work The Embroiderer.

Kersting's most lasting works are his figures in interiors that borrow from seventeenth-century Dutch genre painting. These paintings nevertheless feel contemporary due to the situations depicted and the effect of the artist's personality. The characters are often viewed from the back, as in Friedrich's work, and the scenes provide hints of narrative as the figures engage privately in everyday activities. A number of his works refer to his time in the volunteer corps, the "Lützow rangers". He drew a full-length self-portrait in 1813, in which he wore the rangers' uniform. The painting On Sentry Duty (1815) depicts three rangers, including the artist Ferdinand Hartmann and the writer Theodor Körner, who fought with Kersting and died in wars against the French.

== Selected paintings ==
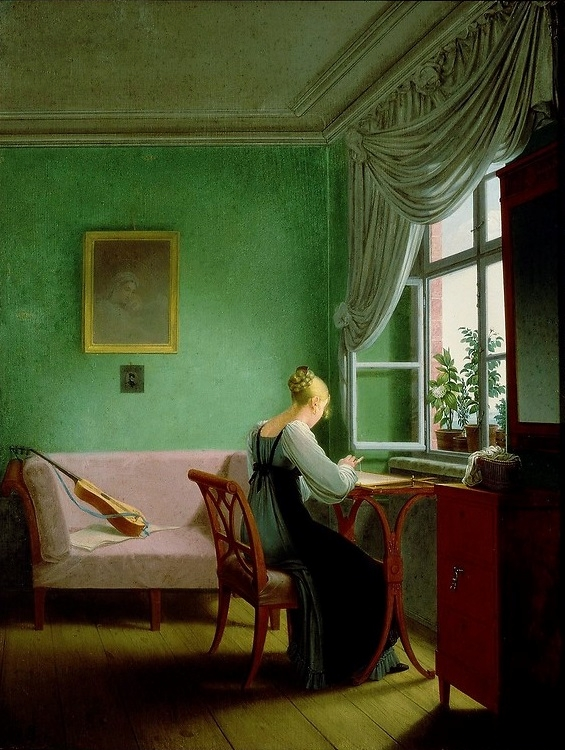
Embroidery woman (1817)

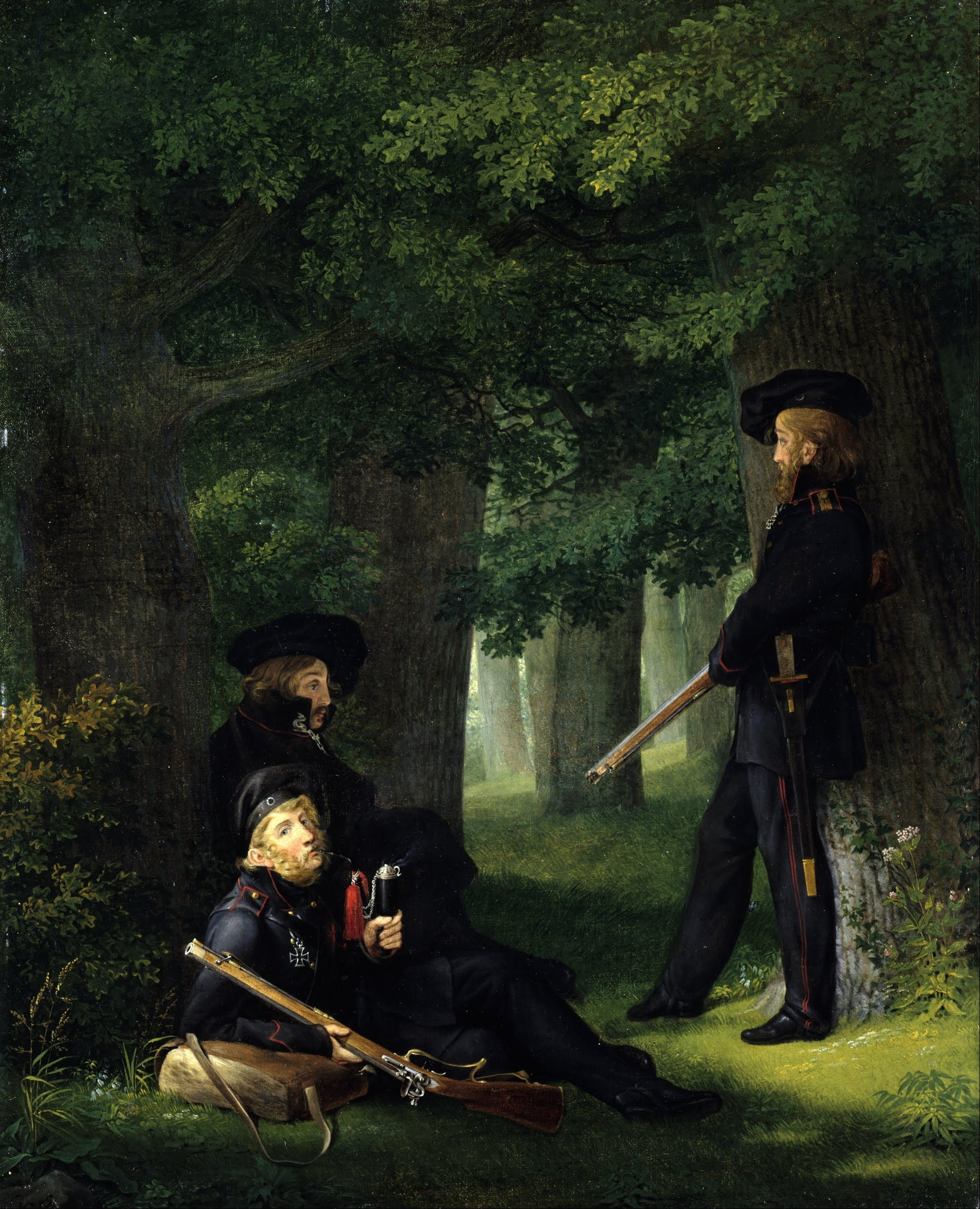
On Sentry Duty (1815)

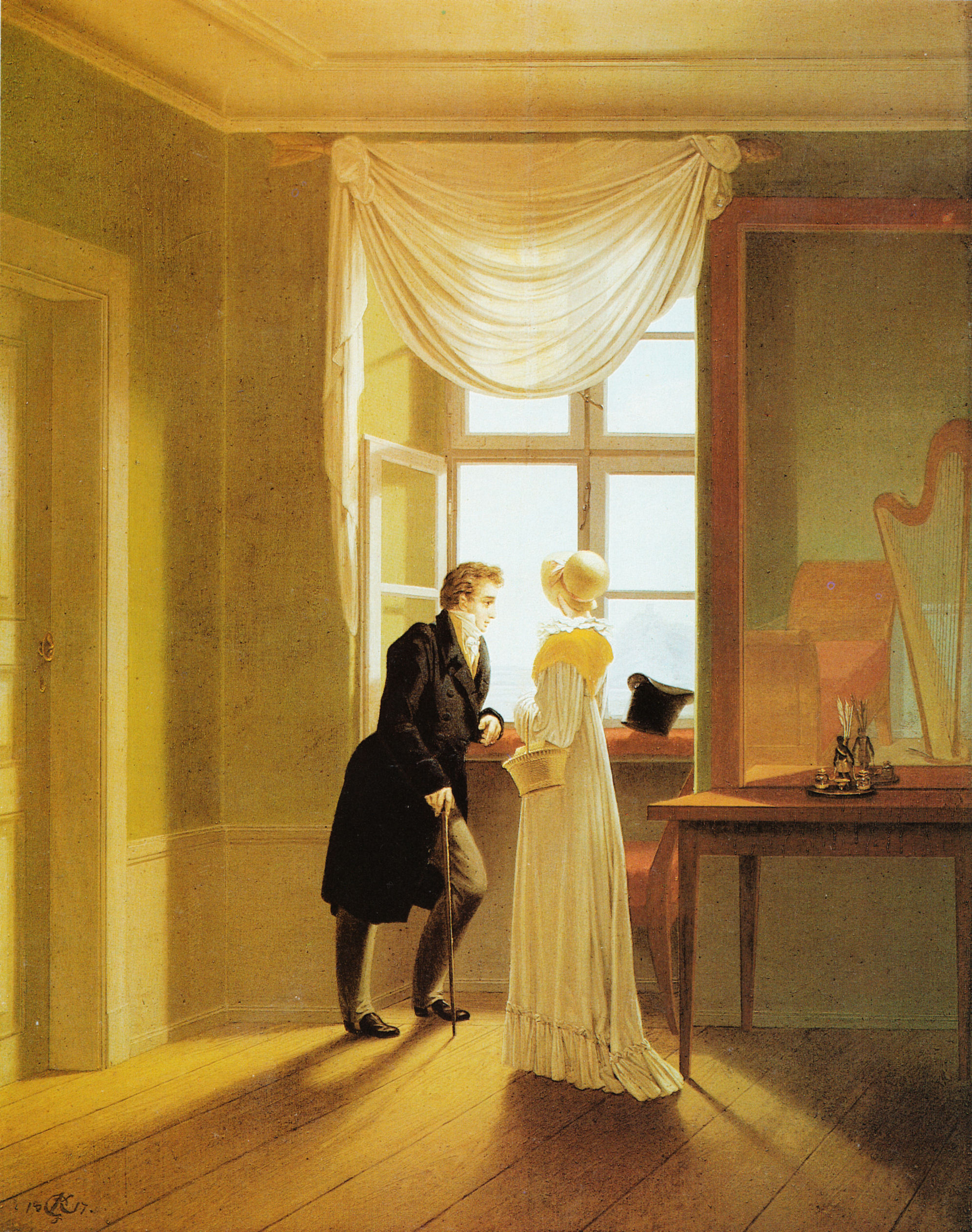
Couple at the Window

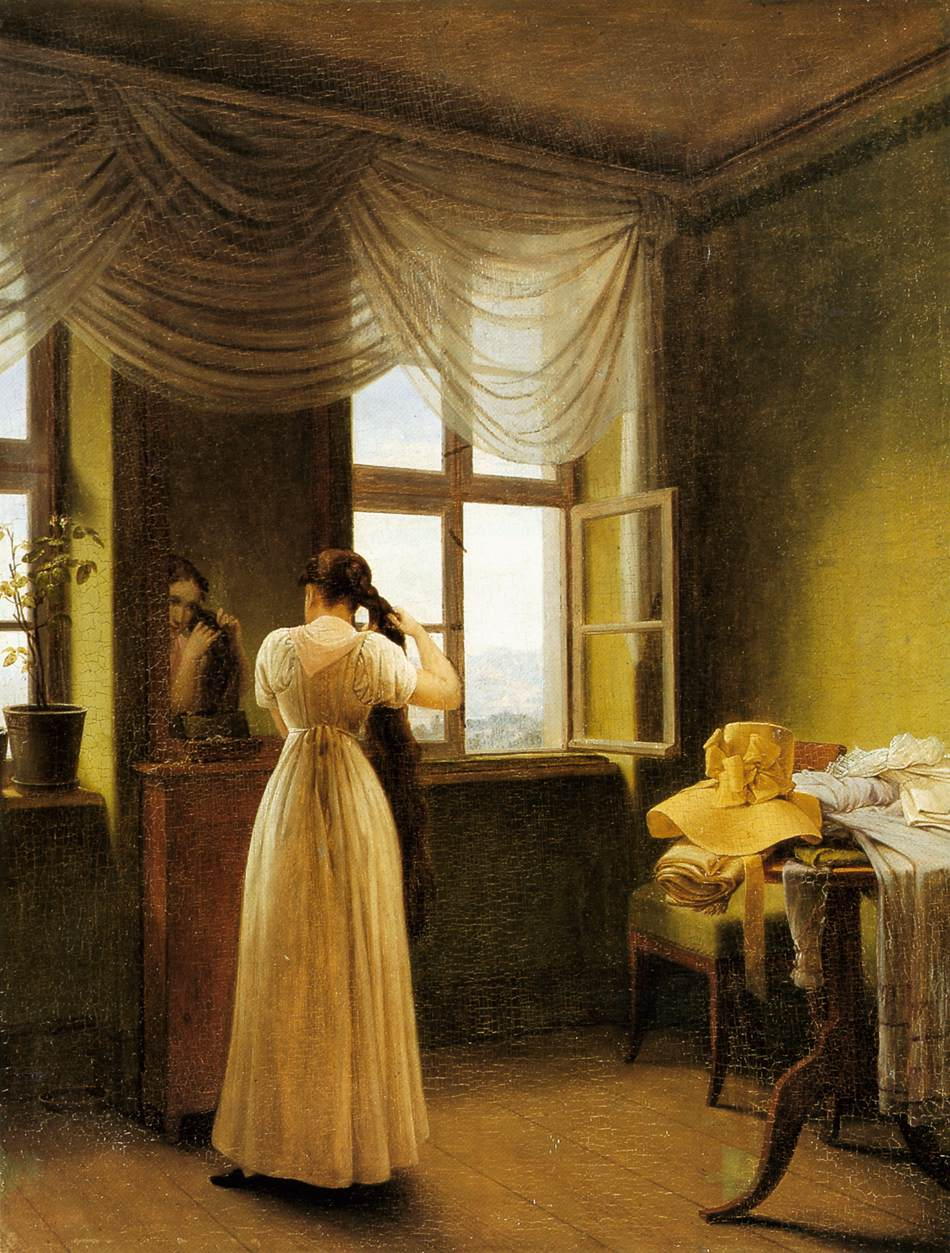
At the Mirror

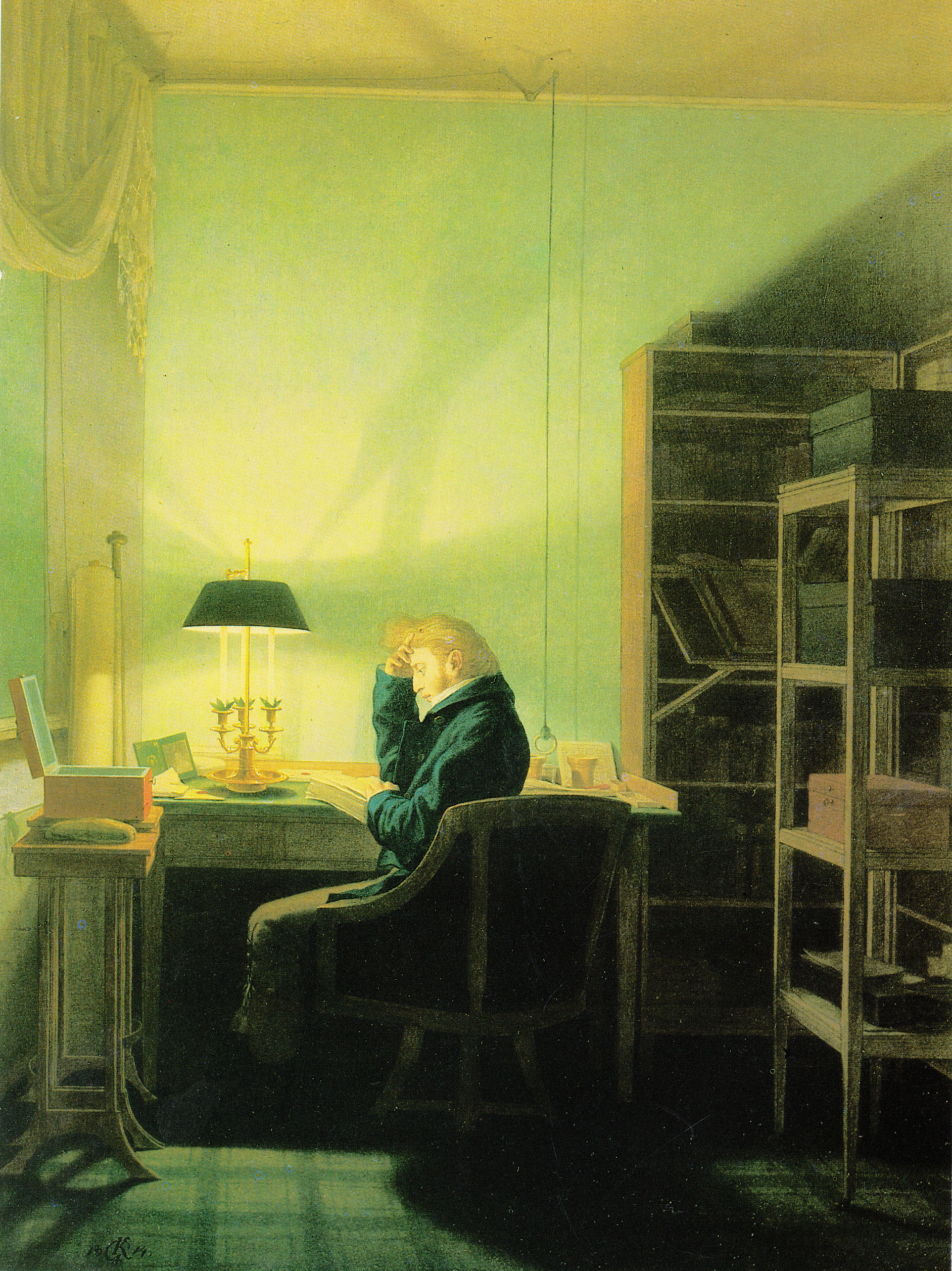
Man Reading by Lamplight

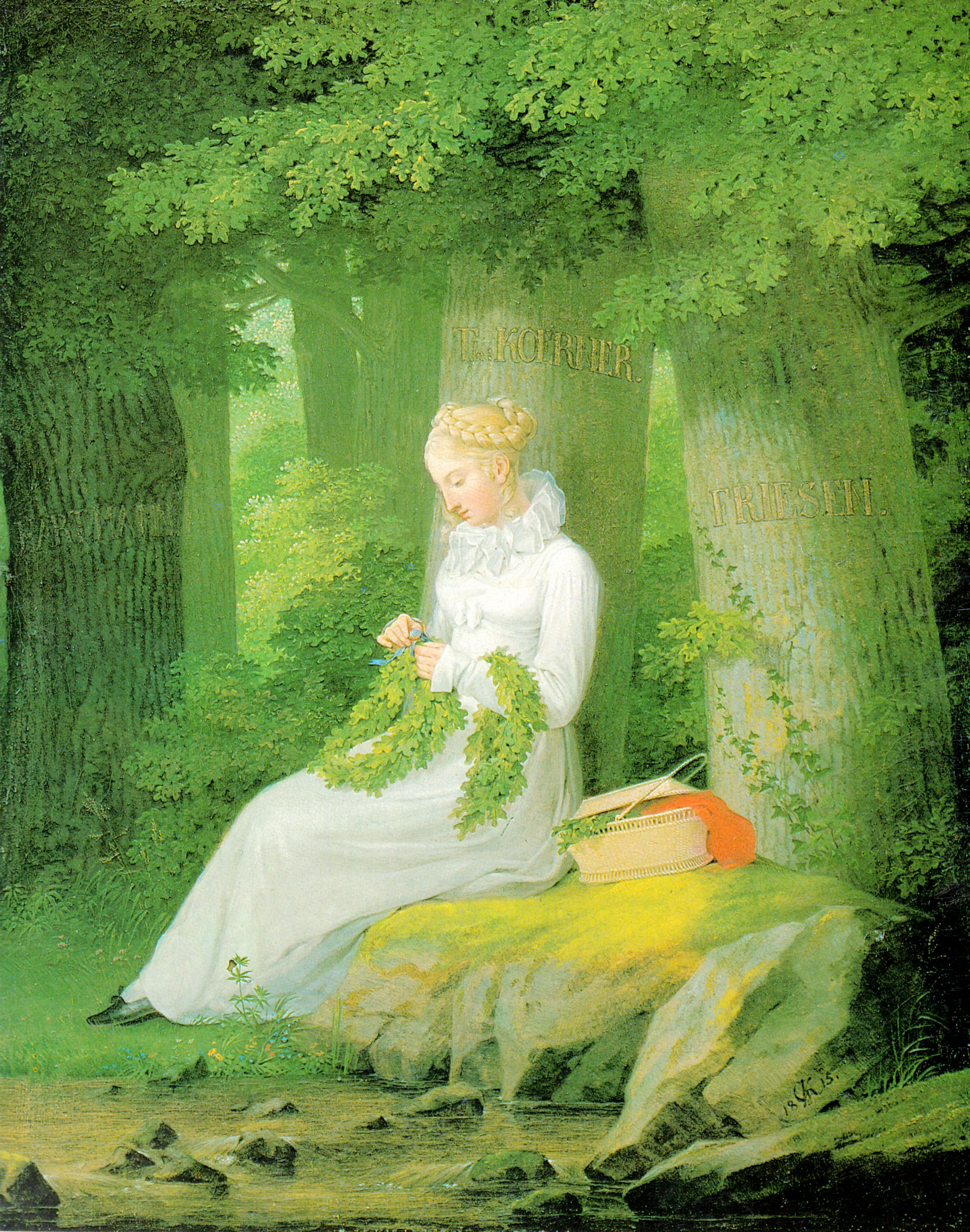
The Wreath Winder

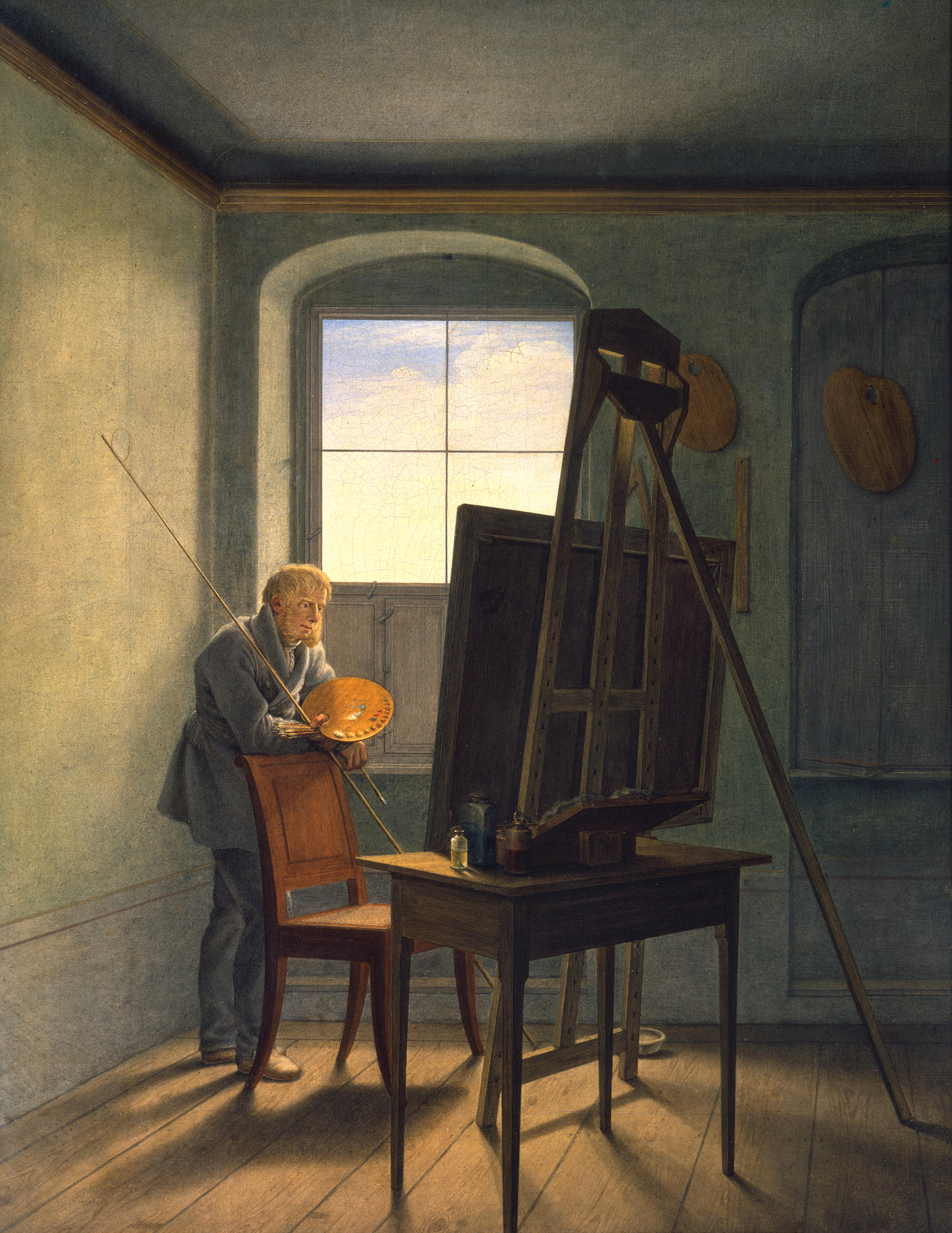
Caspar David Friedrich in his Studio (1819)

== Sources ==
- Muecke, Mikesch W. "Essays on Architecture and Other Topics". Lulu.com. 1 September 2006. ISBN 1-4116-3336-9
- Vaughan, William. German Romantic Painting. New Haven and London: Yale University Press, 1980. ISBN 0-300-02387-1
