= Woldemar Hottenroth =

German painter

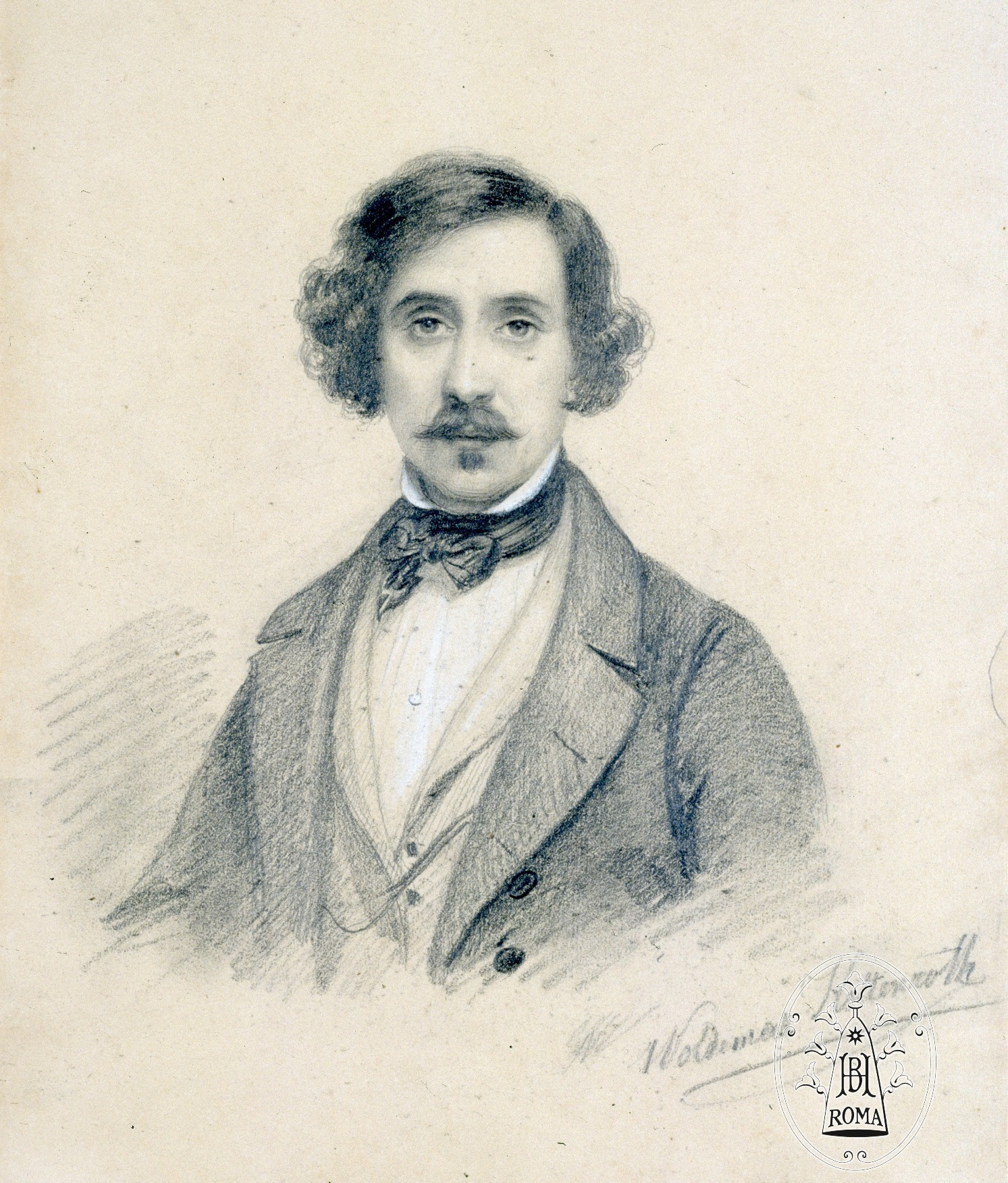
- Self-portrait (date unknown)
- Born: 20 August 1802; Dresden
- Died: 6 September 1894 (aged 92); Dresden
- Occupation: Artist

Woldemar Hottenroth (20 August 1802, in Dresden – 6 September 1894, in Dresden) was a German portrait, landscape and genre painter in the Late-Romantic style.

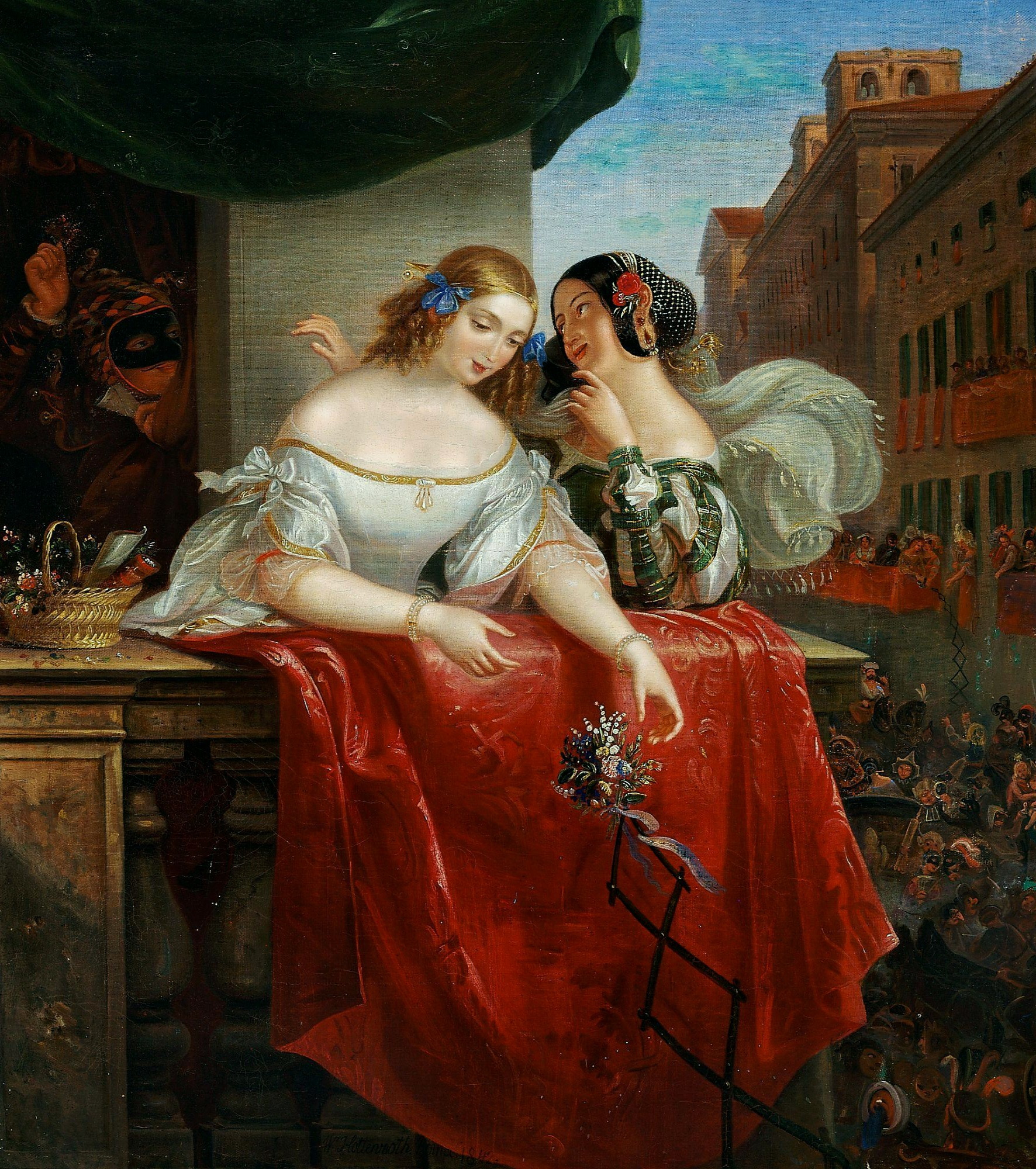
Roman Carnival (1842). A copy of this painting, signed by Augustus Egg and titled Feria at Seville, has apparently been at the British Embassy in Madrid since 1952.

== Life ==
His father worked as a servant for Queen Marie Amalie von Pfalz-Zweibrücken. His ancestors were Italian merchants who came to Germany during the construction of the Dresden Cathedral. At the local Catholic school, one of his fellow students was Ludwig Richter, and he first displayed his artistic talents by coloring the engravings made by Ludwig's father, Carl August Richter. In 1816, he began to take drawing classes at the Dresden Academy of Fine Arts. Later, he attended the regular art classes, where he studied under Friedrich Matthäi and Ferdinand Hartmann. He graduated in 1826.

Together with his brother, Edmund Hottenroth (who would later become a well-known landscape painter), he took a trip through the Giant Mountains and other areas of Bohemia. From 1828 to 1830, a scholarship enabled them to continue their studies in France (where he was influenced by Ary Scheffer and Horace Vernet), then Italy. In Rome, they became part of the circle of German painters there, taking lessons from Joseph Anton Koch and Johann Christian Reinhart.

He returned to Germany in 1843, living in Hamburg with his new wife, followed by a second stay in Italy from 1851 to 1853, then back to Dresden. Working as a freelance artist, he continued to travel extensively. Many of his later works were done in Biedermaier fashion. He died at his summer house, "Am Steinberg" in the Wachwitz District.
