= Johann Carl Rößler =

German portrait painter

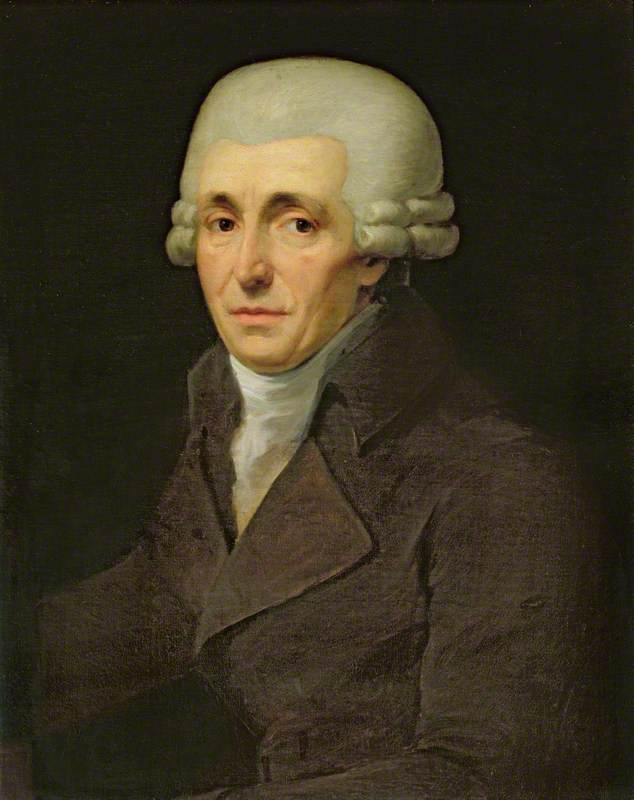
Portrait of Joseph Haydn (1799)

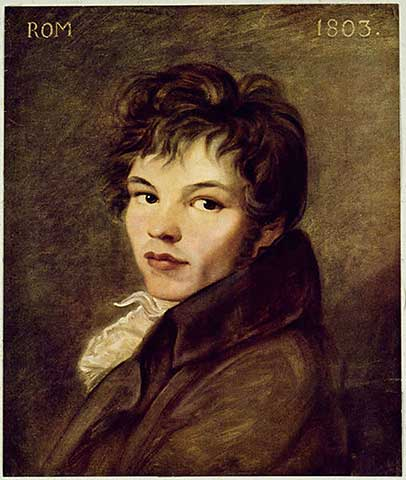
Portrait of Karl Friedrich Schinkel

Johann Carl Rößler (18 May 1775, Görlitz - 20 February 1845, Dresden) was a German portrait painter.

== Biography ==
Originally trained as a nail-maker, he began attending the Dresden Academy of Fine Arts in 1794. His primary instructor there was Giovanni Battista Casanova. His first exhibit came in 1797.

Later, he visited Paris. In 1803, he and a fellow student, Franz Gareis went from Paris to Rome, via Marseille. Gareis died of typhus not long after they arrived. Rößler remained there until 1807, living in an artists' quarter near the Spanish Steps. During his stay, he painted a portrait of the architect, Karl Friedrich Schinkel, and became acquainted with the sculptor, Bertel Thorvaldsen.

In 1810, he became a member of the Dresden Academy, for portrait and history painting. In 1815, he was named a Professor there. From that time on, he was largely devoted to his teaching and his family; doing only some occasional painting.

His notable students included Ernst Benedikt Kietz, Christian Tunica and Adolf Zimmermann.
