= Edmund Hottenroth =

German landscape painter (1804–1889)

- Born: October 9, 1804; Blasewitz, Dresden, Germany
- Died: April 13, 1889 (aged 84); Rome, Italy
- Occupation: Painter
- Relatives: Woldemar Hottenroth

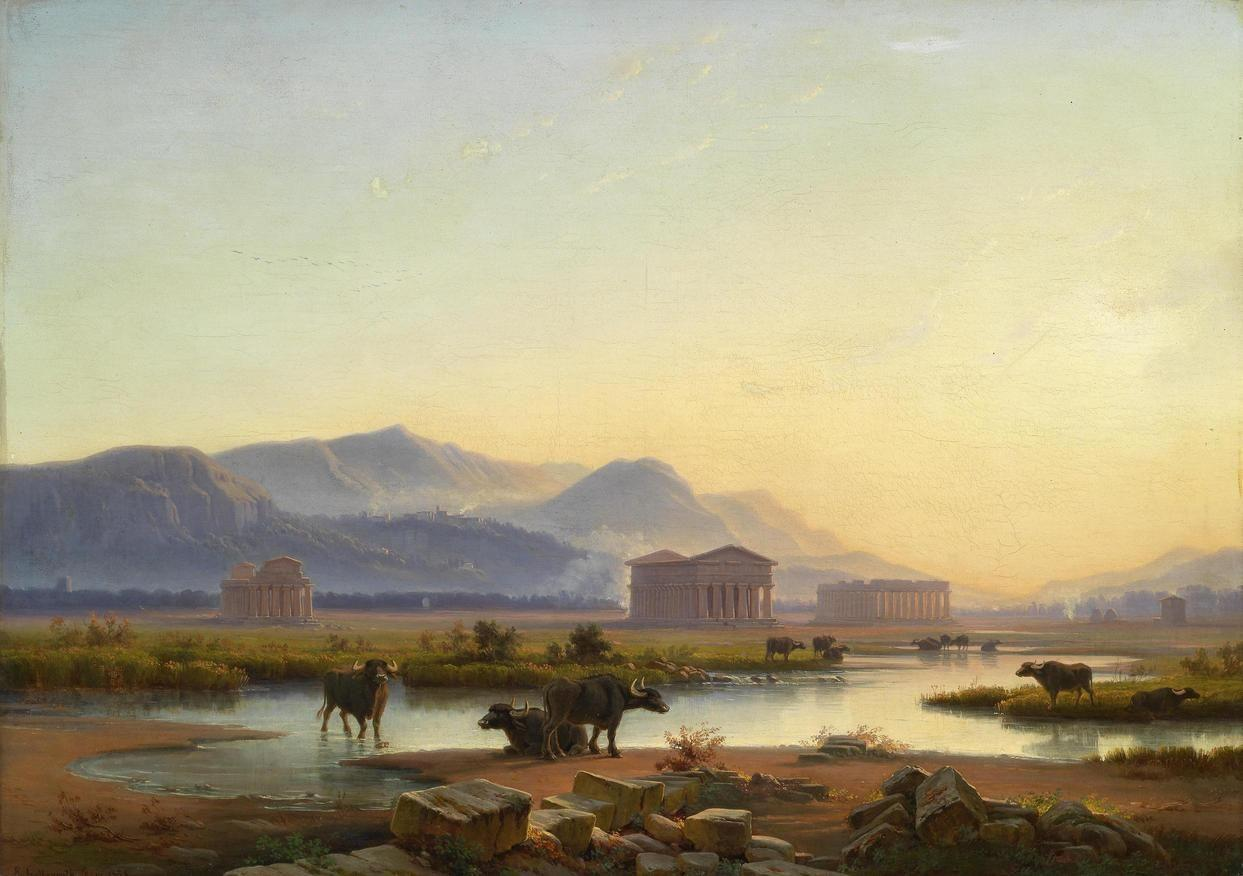
Water Buffalo in the Roman Campagna

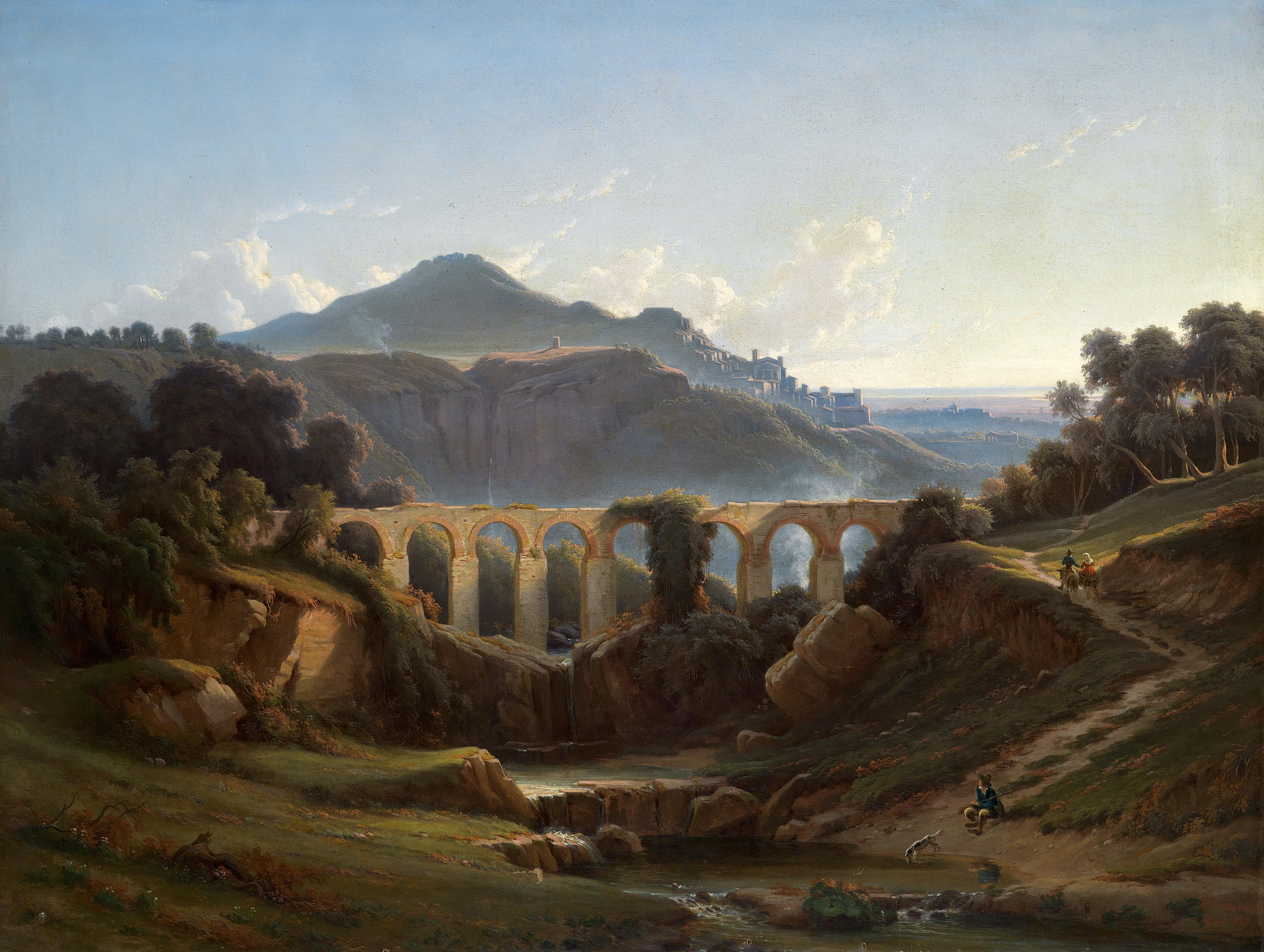
View of the Campagna with Roman Aqueduct

Edmund Hottenroth (9 October 1804, Blasewitz – 13 April 1889, Rome) was a German landscape painter in the late Romantic style. His brother was the portrait and genre painter, Woldemar Hottenroth.

== Life and work ==
He was born to Franz Aloys Hottenroth, a Chamberlain, and his wife Josepha, née Busetti. Her ancestors were Italian merchants, who had come to Germany during the construction of Dresden Cathedral.

He attended a Catholic school, then served an apprenticeship at a business. He was largely self-taught in drawing and painting, although he took a few lessons from Caspar David Friedrich and Johan Christian Dahl.

In 1826, together with his brother, he took a trip to the Riesengebirge, and other parts of Bohemia. From 1829 to 1830 he and Woldemar were in Paris, following which they made a joint study trip to Italy. There, they became a part of the German-Roman community; taking lessons from Joseph Anton Koch and Johann Christian Reinhart.

Woldemar returned to Germany in 1844, but he chose to stay in Rome and become a landscape painter. He also designed and executed decorations for the Antico Caffè Greco; a gathering place for the intellectual community. He died in Rome and was buried there.

== Sources ==
- Johann Edmund Hottenroth: Woldemar Hottenroth (1802–1894) – Das Leben eines Malers, 1927, Aretz, Dresden
- Claudia Maria Müller: Zum 200. Geburtstag des Malers Woldemar Hottenroth (1802–1894), Dresden, 2002
- Gabriele Gorgas: "Zwei wenig bekannte Spätromantiker", in: Dresdner Neueste Nachrichten, #28. Januar 2013, pg.16
