= Christian Ernst Stölzel =

German engraver, etcher and painter

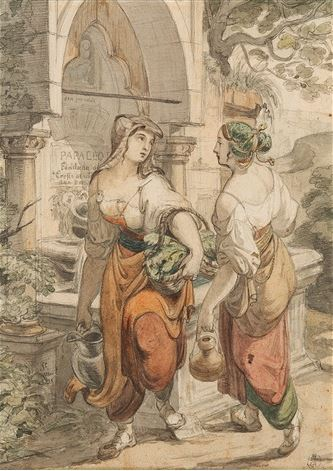
Two Roman Women at the Fountain

Christian Ernst Stölzel (10 February 1792 – 4 April 1837) was a German painter, etcher and engraver.

== Biography ==
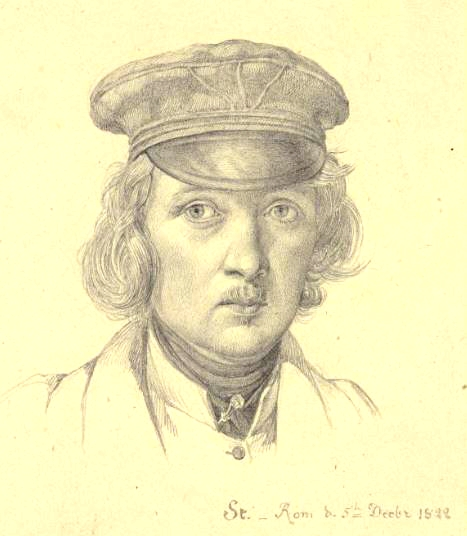
Self-portrait (1822)

He was born in Dresden to Christian Friedrich Stölzel, an engraver and art professor, who provided him and his two siblings with their primary education. At the age of sixteen, he decided that he too would become an engraver. In pursuit of that goal, he went to the Dresden Academy of Fine Arts, where he took lessons in perspective from Gottlob August Hölzer. He also spent many evenings in self-study at the Skulpturensammlung.

A serious illness, from 1812 to 1813, prevented him from pursuing his career. No sooner had he recovered, than he found himself conscripted for the Befreiungskriege against Napoleon. Altogether, he lost three years to these interruptions.

In 1822, he began a journey, on foot, to Rome. During his stay there, he became an honorary member of the Accademia di Belle Arti di Roma. He returned to Dresden in 1828.

He found employment as a drawing teacher at the Dresden Academy in 1830. His notable students there included Gustav Adolph Hennig and Georg Heinrich Busse. After his death, he was succeeded by Carl Gottlieb Peschel.

He never married, and had no known children.

== Sources ==
- Christian Ernst Stölzel in Neuer Nekrolog der Deutschen, #15, 1837, Part I, Weimar 1839. pg.406
- Christian Ernst Stölzel in Abend-Zeitung, 1822, pg.83
