= Caspar David Friedrich in his Studio =

Two paintings by Georg Friedrich Kersting

- Caspar David Friedrich in seinem Atelier (German)
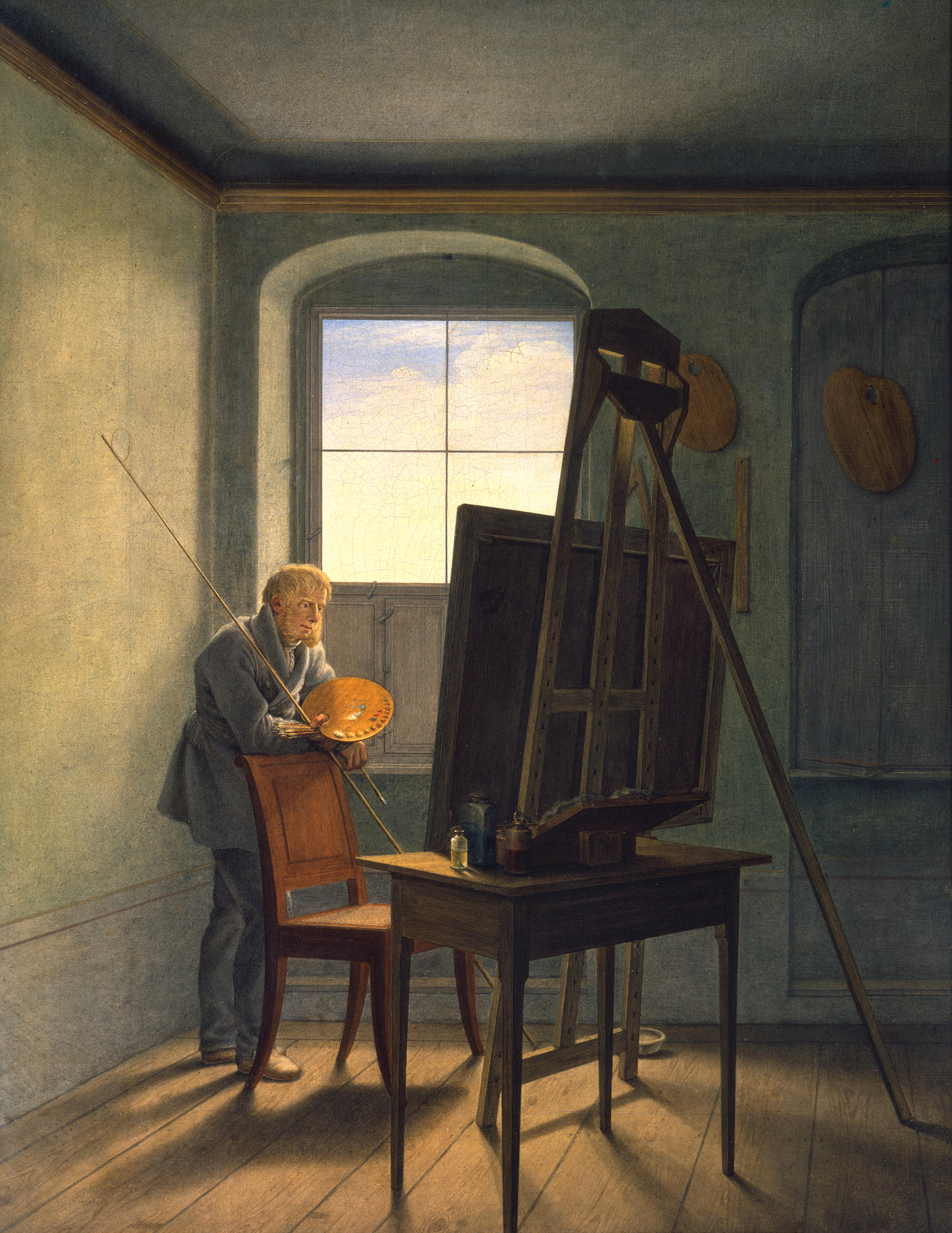
- Artist: Georg Friedrich Kersting
- Year: 1819
- Medium: Oil on canvas
- Dimensions: 51 cm × 40 cm (20 in × 15.7 in)
- Location: Alte Nationalgalerie; Berlin

Caspar David Friedrich in his Studio refers to two paintings by the German romantic artist Georg Friedrich Kersting dated 1811 and 1819. Of these the 1819 version, now in the Alte Nationalgalerie in Berlin, is the best known. In both Kersting depicted fellow German painter Caspar David Friedrich in his studio.

The picture shows the painter leaning on the back of a chair, focused entirely upon the easel before him. It is not possible for the viewer to see what the artist sees, because only the back of the canvas is visible. Friedrich, apparently lost in thought, holds in his right hand a brush, and in his left a mahlstick, palette, and several other brushes. The studio is ascetically bare containing only two other palettes, a straightedge and a t-square hanging on the wall.

== Hamburg version ==
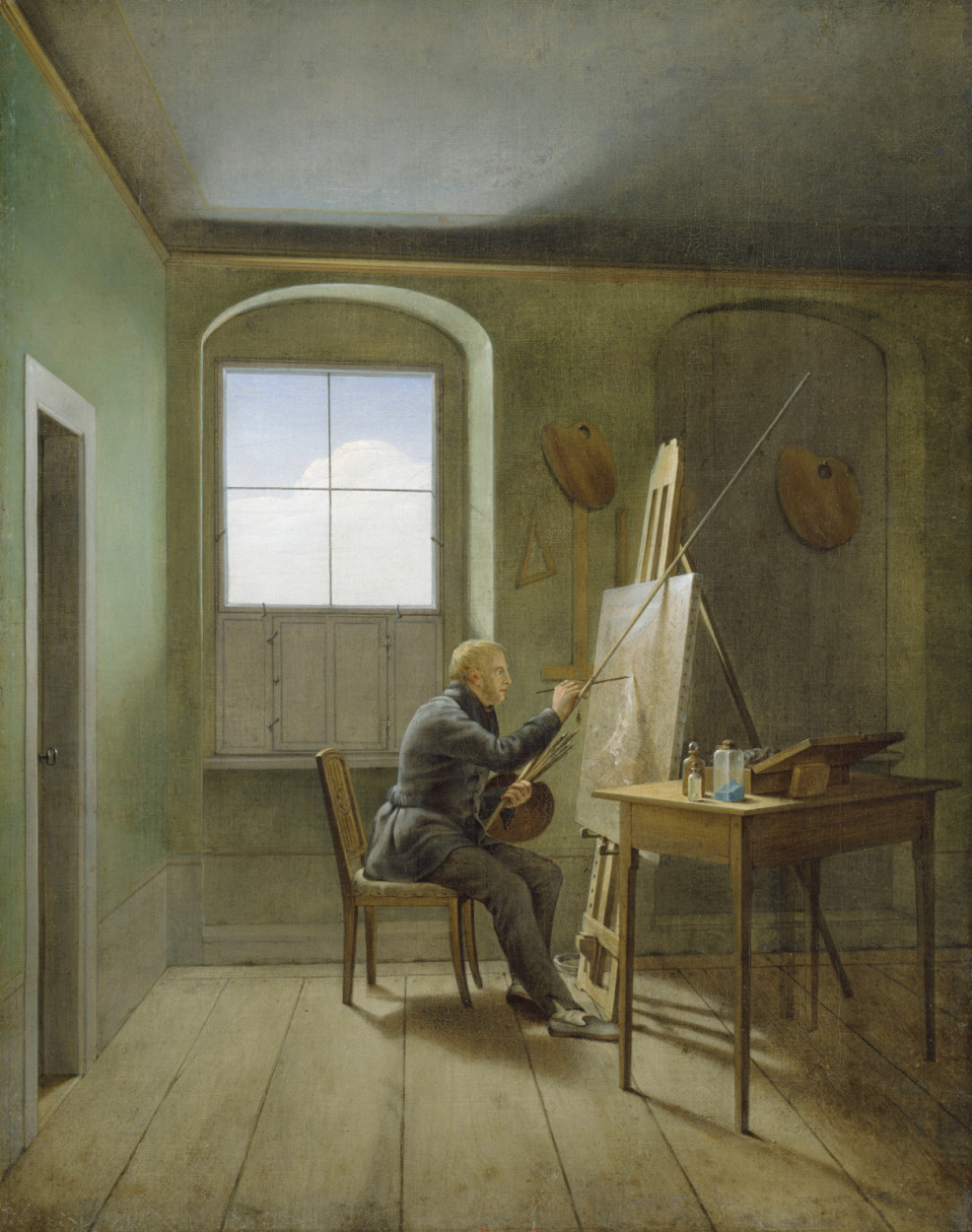
Hamburg version (1811).

In the Hamburg Kunsthalle version (1811) Friedrich is seated before his easel, painting, with his arm leaning on the mahlstick. In this version the viewer shares his view of the painting, which is recognizably a mountain landscape with a waterfall. A replica painted in 1819 is currently located in Mannheim.

=== Berlin version ===
Friedrich sought seclusion, so that he could pursue his work undisturbed. Kersting depicts painting as a contemplative and reflective process - therefore the studio serves as a place of pure concentration. It is not what Frederick paints that is important, but the reverent meditation with which he paints.

In the Berlin version the painter is far more removed from the outside world - a chair leg is interposed between his feet and the viewer, and the door to the left of the composition is no longer visible. Most important, however, is the rotation of the easel, which hides the painting from the viewer. The picture has probably progressed to the point where Friedrich laid aside his plein-air drawings of nature and let his own recollection guide the painting to completion. All distractions have been removed from the almost empty studio. The painter Karl von Kügelgen added:

Even the things most necessary to painting - the box of paints, the bottles of linseed oil, and the oil-rag - were moved to the adjoining room, because Frederick was of the opinion that any objects would disturb his inner world of imagination...

The doctor and naturalist Carl Gustav Carus described his working process as follows:

He never made sketches, cartoons, or color studies for his paintings, because he stated (and certainly he was not entirely wrong), that such aids chill the imagination somewhat. He did not begin to paint an image until it stood, living, in the presence of his soul...

Friedrich himself did not elaborate upon his methods. He spoke and wrote of his studio time as the " consecrated hour " within which he did not wish to be disturbed.

Kügelgen asked himself about the significance of the T-square, which hung as the " sole adornment " on the wall, and how " alone among all other things it was so honored". The reason was that ruler and triangle adhere to the sober simplicity of the studio and to Friedrich's working methods, a number of which involved mathematics.

== Studio ==
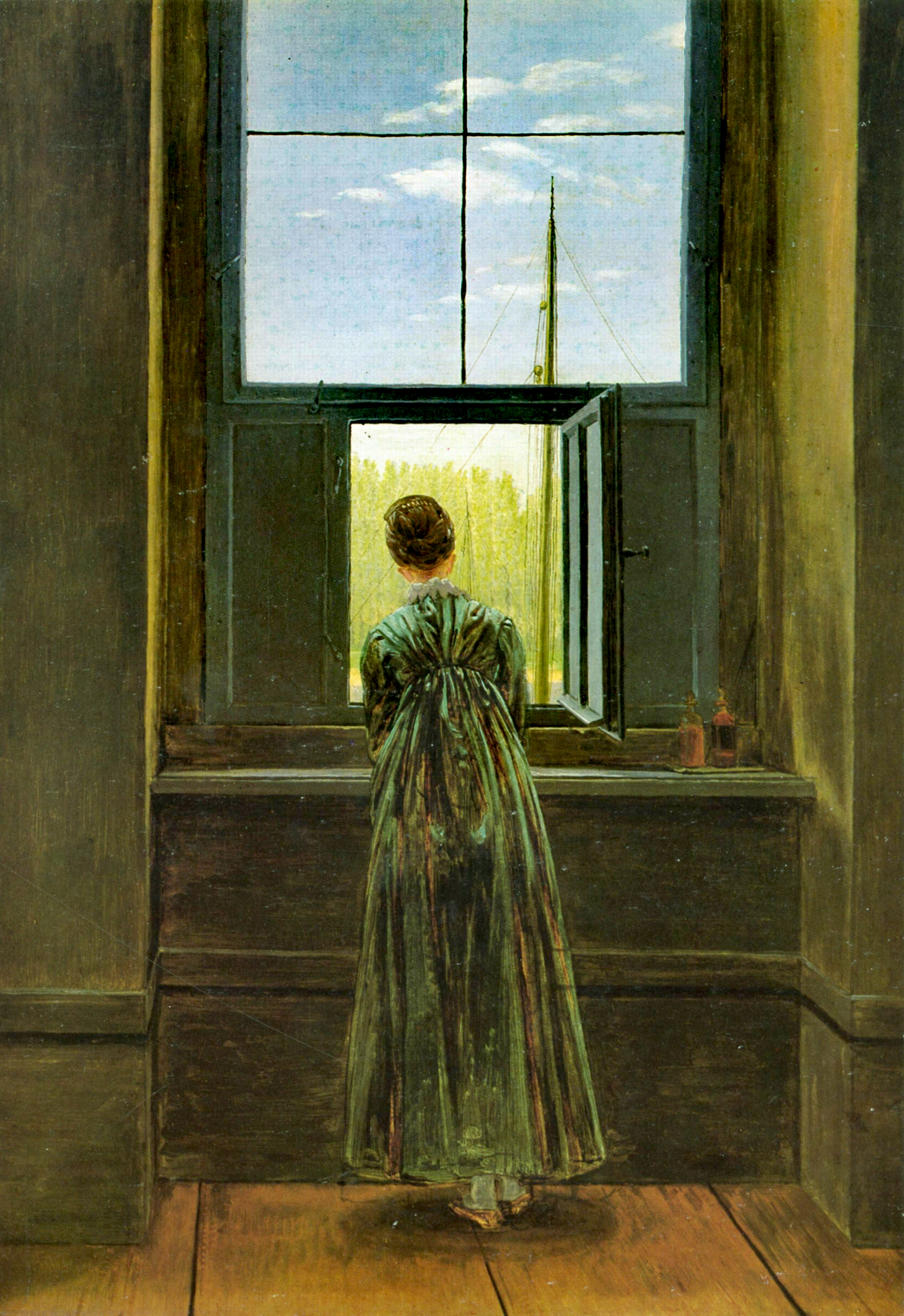
Woman at the Window (German: Frau am Fenster)

Friedrich's Dresden studio was in the suburb of Pirna. He continued to use it up to 1820. From two sepia drawings from 1805-06 it is evident that the windows here of the studio on the Elbe opened outwards. Friedrich constructed the wooden shutters only after 1806 and took them with him when he moved to a larger house after marrying. These shutters can be seen in the new studio space in the painting Woman at the Window of 1822.

== Georg Friedrich Kersting ==
Kersting belonged to the Dresden circle of Friedrich's friends, and like him came from Mecklenburg and had studied from the same teachers in the Copenhagen academy from 1805 to 1808, until settling in Dresden. Kersting accompanied Friedrich in the summer of 1810 on a hike in the Sudeten mountains, and is probably the figure depicted in several of Friedrich's drawings and watercolors from that time. In 1818 Kersting became the head of the painting department of the porcelain factory in Meissen, but still remained in contact with Friedrich for a time.

Kersting preferred painting portraits with an interior setting, and portrayed people familiar to him in a manner that held personal meanings. However, none of his other paintings were as spare as this portrait of his famous friend Friedrich. It differs enormously from the "chaotic study" of the painter Gerhard von Kügelgen, which was stuffed with innumerable plaster casts and painting equipment.
