= Carl Gottlieb Peschel =

German painter (1798–1879)

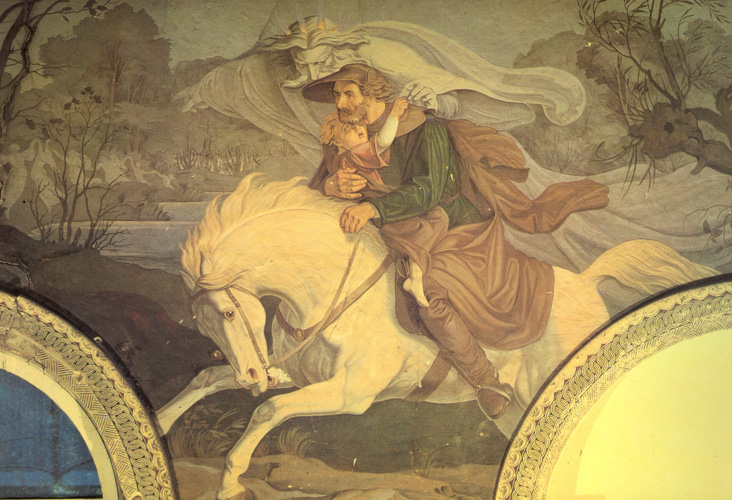
Scene from Goethe's poem Der Erlkönig. (Fresco at the "Belvedere", c.1837)

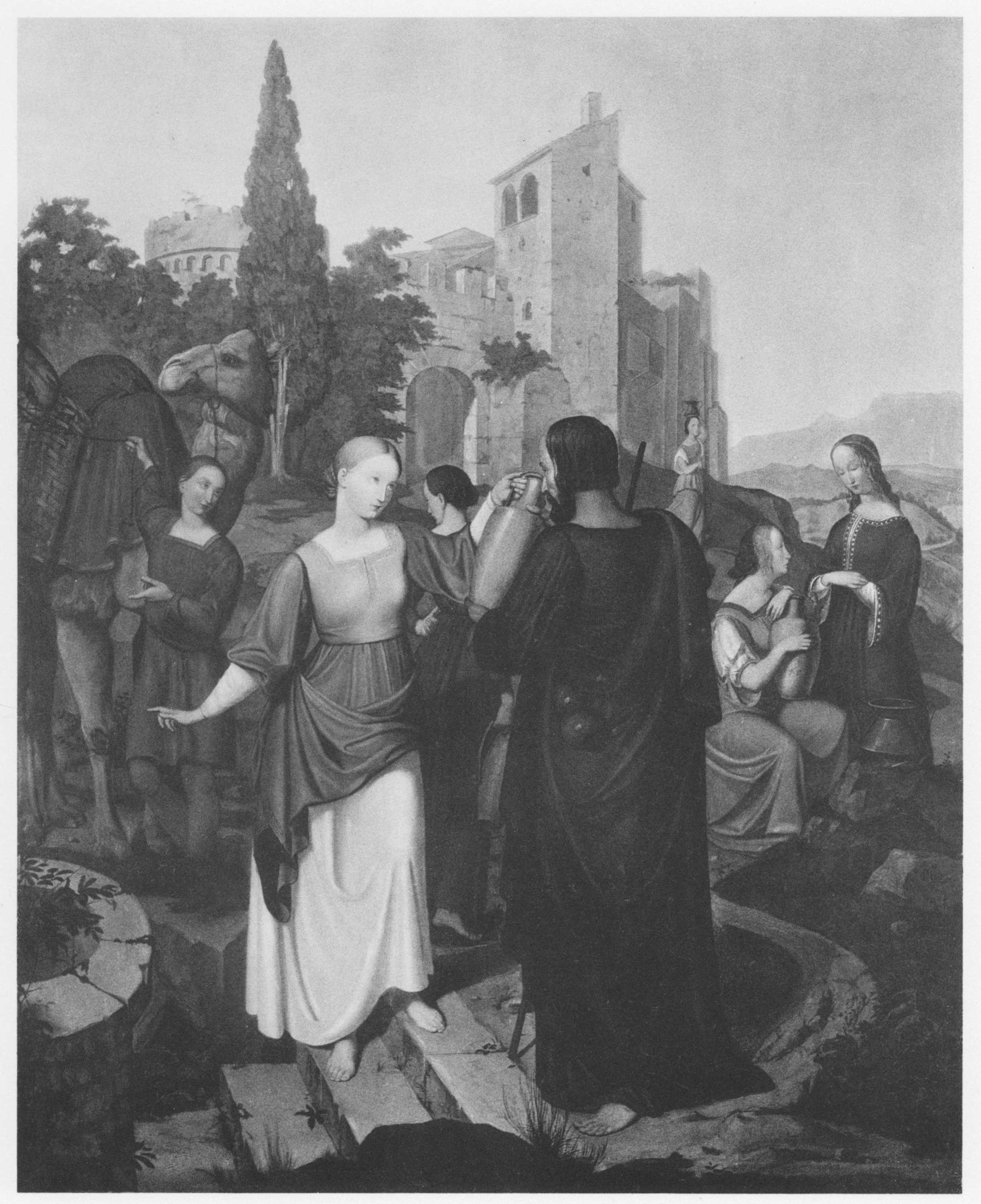
Eliezer and Rebecca at the Well

Carl Gottlieb Peschel (31 March 1798, Dresden – 3 July 1879, Dresden) was a German painter. He was a member of the Nazarene movement.

== Biography ==
Beginning in 1812, he became a student at the Dresden Academy of Fine Arts. When Carl Christian Vogel von Vogelstein was commissioned to paint the ceilings at the Schloss Pillnitz, Peschel worked as his assistant. He inherited part of his father's military pension and used the money to finance a study trip to Rome with his friend Adolf Zimmermann in 1825-1826. When he returned home, he supported himself by giving drawing lessons and painting snuff cans. After the Saxon Art Association bought his painting Eliezer and Rebecca at the Well, he was able to give full attention to his work.

He was commissioned to complete the frescoes at the Härtel House in Leipzig after Bonaventura Genelli had gotten into several quarrels and walked off the job. From 1836 to 1838, he was engaged by Johann Gottlob von Quandt to paint frescoes, depicting episodes from the works of Goethe, at his manor "Belvedere" in the Schönfeld Upland. In 1837, he became a teacher at the Dresden Academy, replacing Christian Ernst Stölzel, and was appointed a professor in 1846. He became a member of the Academic Council there in 1859. He retired in 1877.

Although he originally preferred motifs from the Old Testament, from 1850 on his paintings were more often related to the New Testament.

A street in Dresden has been named the "Peschelstrasse" in his honor.

== Illustrations ==
- In: ABC-Buch für kleine und große Kinder / gezeichnet von Dresdner Künstlern. Mit Erzählungen und Liedern von R. Reinick und Singweisen von Ferdinand Hiller. Leipzig: Wigand, 1845. (Digitalized by the University and State Library Düsseldorf)

== Writings ==
- Carl Peschel: Das Buch Tobiä in elf bildlichen Darstellungen. Zur Förderung frommen Sinnes herausgegeben mit einem Vorworte begleitet von D. August Hahn. C. G. Börner, Leipzig, 1830.
