= Heinrich Carl Wilhelm Vitzthum von Eckstädt =

Saxon Privy Councilor

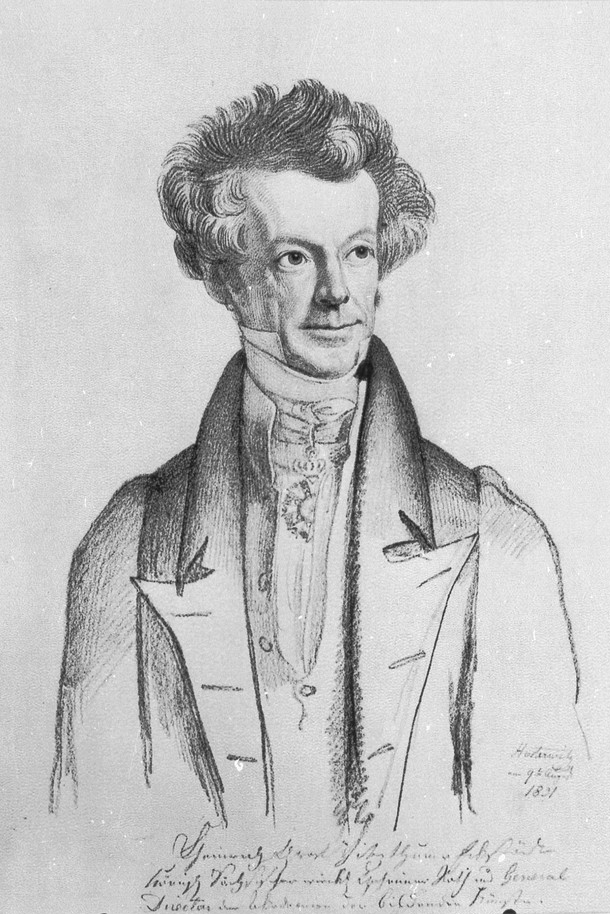
Heinrich Graf Vitzthum von Eckstädt; portrait by Carl Christian Vogel von Vogelstein (1831)

Count Heinrich Carl Wilhelm Vitzthum von Eckstädt (26 March 1770, Dresden - 11 October 1837, Dresden) was a Saxon Privy Councilor, who served as General Director of the Dresden Academy of Fine Arts, and the Staatskapelle Dresden.

== Biography ==
He was born into the noble family of Vitzthum and was the fourth son of Ludwig Siegfried Graf Vitzthum von Eckstädt. His mother was his father's second wife, Auguste Erdmuthe (1738–1775), from the noble family of Ponickau.

Like most of his relatives, he embarked on an administrative career, in service to the House of Wettin, and was initially a private financial counselor at the Dresden Court. In 1815, he was appointed the Royal Saxon Court Marshal. This automatically made him Director of the Staatskapelle and the Staatstheaters, in Dresden and Leipzig. In those positions, he is primarily known for the vigorous support he gave to the composer, Carl Maria von Weber who, at his urging, was named Kapellmeister in 1816.

He also served as Director of the Dresden Academy of Fine Arts, and the Hochschule für Grafik und Buchkunst Leipzig, until shortly before his death.

In 1793, he married Friederike Wilhelmine Gräfin von Hopffgarten (1767-1837), the daughter of Georg Wilhelm von Hopffgarten, a Saxon Cabinet Minister. They had eight children, only four of whom survived infancy.
