= Ferdinand Hartmann =

German painter (1774–1842)

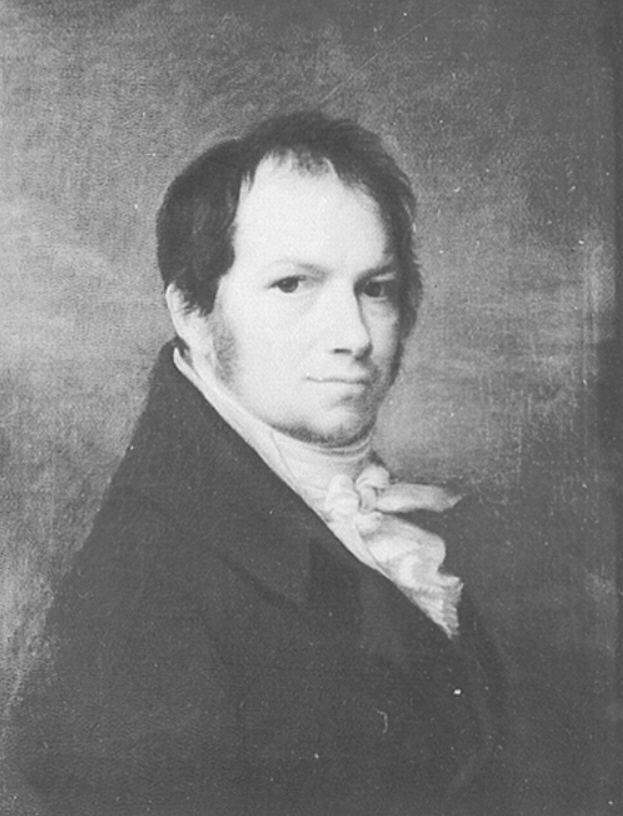
Self-portrait (c. 1815)

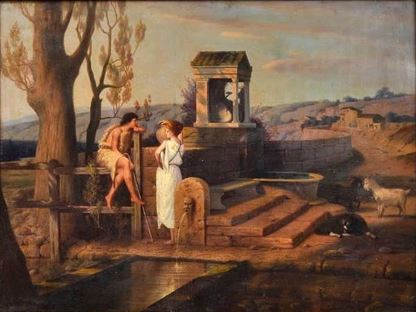
Rebecca and Eliezer at the Fountain

Christian Ferdinand Hartmann (14 July 1774 – 6 January or June 1842) was a German portrait and Classical history painter.

== Biography ==
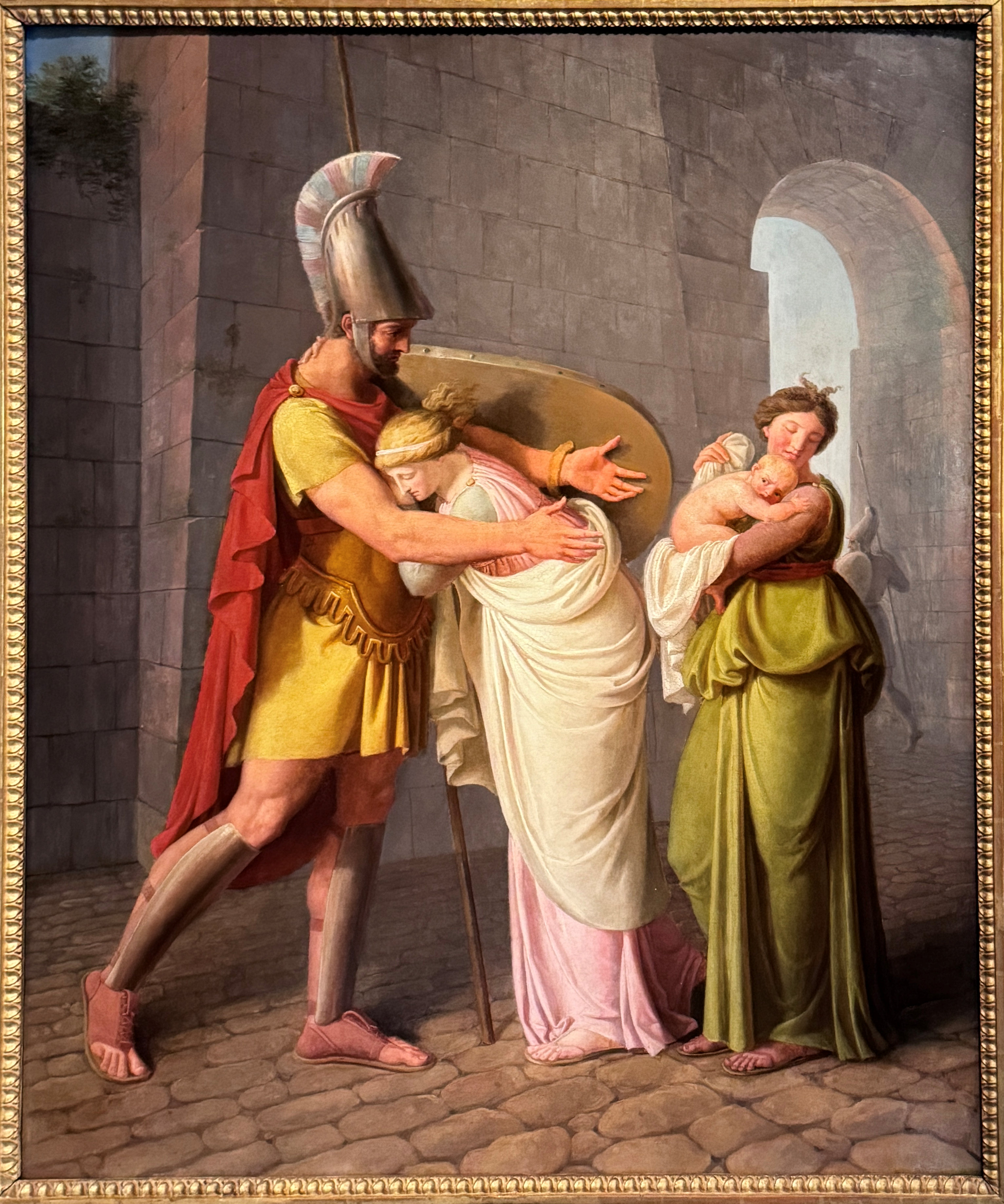
Hector bidding farewell to Andromache, 1800, Anhaltische Gemäldegalerie Dessau

He was born in Stuttgart. He was the youngest son of the Ducal finance councilor, Johann Georg Hartmann and his wife Juliane Friederike née Spittler (1736–1799), daughter of the Mayor of Cannstatt. Three of his brothers also became well-known: August, a State Councilor, Friedrich, a paleontologist, and Ludwig, an industrial entrepreneur. His father's home was also a literary salon, frequented by many notable writers, including Goethe, Schiller and Hölderlin.

From 1786 to 1794, he studied painting at the Hohe Karlsschule in Stuttgart. He spent the years 1794 to 1798 in Rome, on a study trip, where his choice of style was influenced by Asmus Carstens. Upon returning, he became a member of the State Academy of Fine Arts. From 1803 to 1809, he was in the employ of Princess Louise of Brandenburg-Schwedt, in Dresden. The following year, he was appointed a Professor at the Dresden Academy of Fine Arts. His students there included Johann August Krafft and Woldemar Hottenroth.

During his stay with the Princess, he made the acquaintance of the writer, Heinrich von Kleist. It has been suggested that their friendship helped inspire Kleist to write Das Käthchen von Heilbronn, as Hartmann's only sister, Henriette (1762–1820), had married the lawyer (and amateur artist), Friedrich Christoph Mayer, whose family had a long history in Heilbronn.

He made a second visit to Rome from 1820 to 1823. In 1825, he was named a member of the Board of Directors of the Dresden Academy. he died in 1842 in Dresden.

== Sources ==
- Julius Hartmann (1879). "Hartmann, Ferdinand" . Allgemeine Deutsche Biographie (in German). Vol. 10. Leipzig: Duncker & Humblot. p. 682.
- Georg Himmelheber: "Lavater, die Hartmanns und eine unbekannte Zeichnung von Nicolas Guibal". In: Zeitschrift für Württembergische Landesgeschichte #64 (2005), pp. 199–210.
- Wolfgang Freiherr von Löhneysen (1966). "Hartmann, Christian Ferdinand". Neue Deutsche Biographie (in German). Vol. 7. Berlin: Duncker & Humblot. p. 733. (full text online).
- Edwin H. Zeydel: "Der Maler Ferdinand Hartmann und Ludwig Tiecks Ausgabe der Schriften Kleists. (Mit zwei unbekannten Briefen Tiecks". In: Jahrbuch der Kleist-Gesellschaft, 1933–1937. Edited by Georg Minde-Pouet and Julius Petersen. (Schriften der Kleist-Gesellschaft, Vol.17), pp. 95–97.
