= Molly Cramer =

German artist

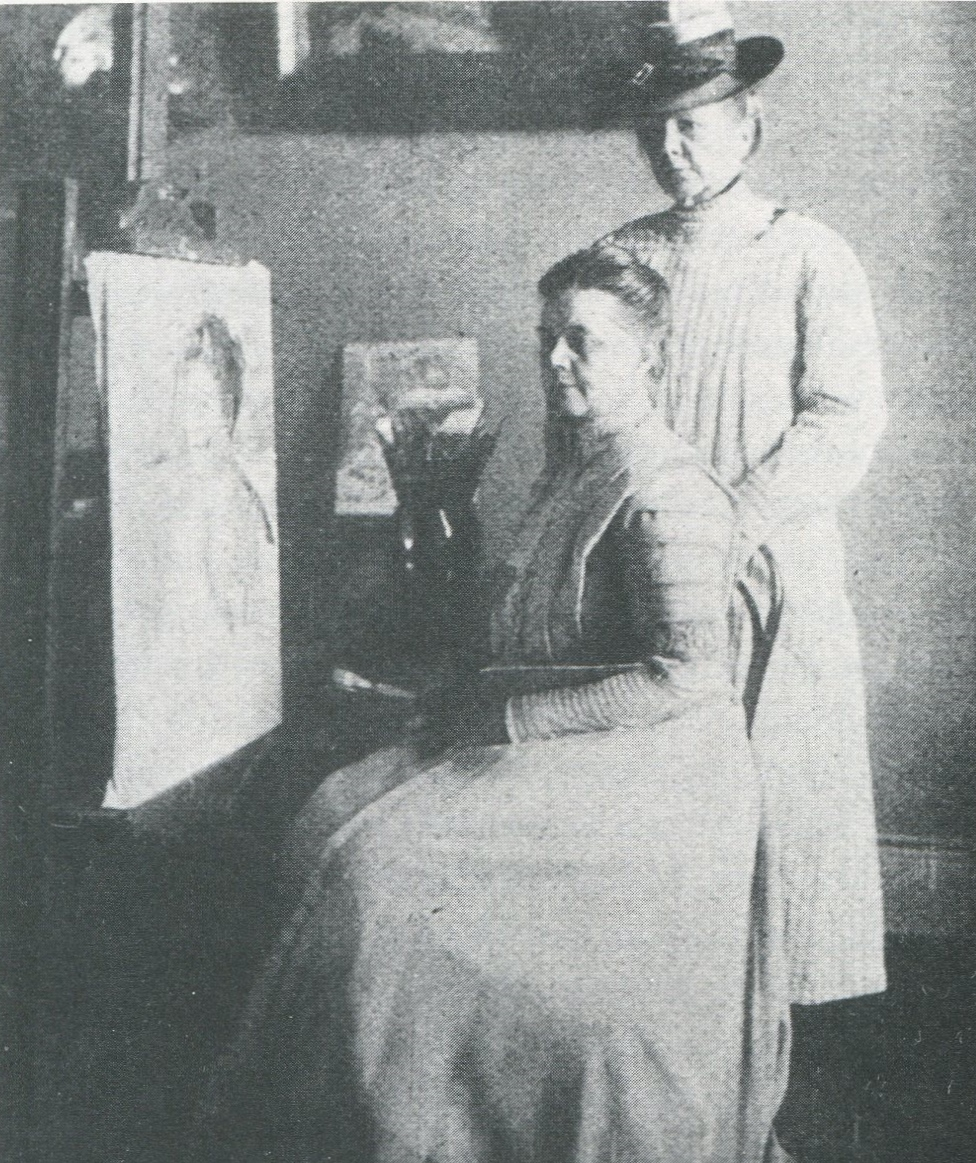
- Molly Cramer with her sister Helene in 1900
- Born: 25 June 1852; Hamburg, German Confederation
- Died: 18 January 1936 (aged 83); Hamburg, The Third Reich
- Education: Traditional Dutch school
- Known for: Still life paintings of flowers and fruits, landscapes, portraits
- Notable work: Goldlack und Primeln ("Wallflowers and primroses"), 1899, Oil on canvas
- Movement: Impressionism
- Patrons: Alfred Lichtwark

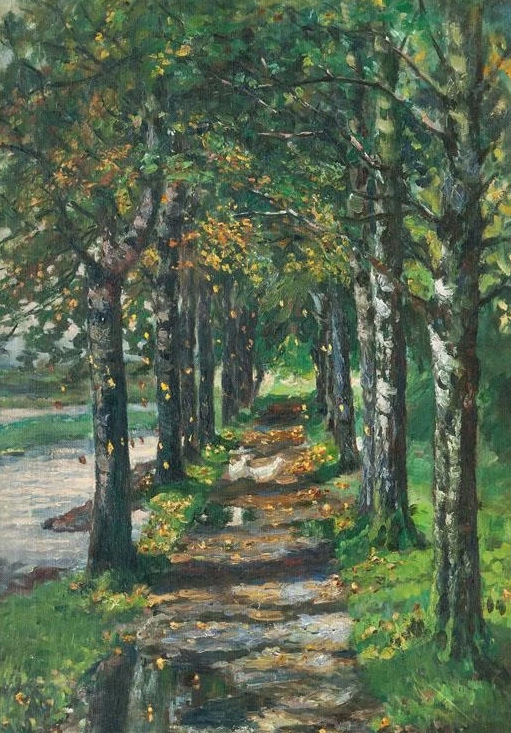
Geese on a Late Summer Alameda

Molly Cramer (25 June 1852 – 18 January 1936) was a German flower, landscape and portrait painter. Trained in the old Dutch tradition, she turned to Impressionism in her later years.

== Life ==
Cramer came from a wealthy merchant family in Hamburg. Along with her sister, the painter Helene Cramer, she could begin training as a painter only after her father's death in 1882. Her first teacher was the Hamburg artist Theobald Riefesell, followed by the painters Carl Rodeck and Hinrich Wrage. In 1890, she went to Antwerp to train under Eugène Joors, who taught in the tradition of the Dutch school. She primarily painted floral still lifes with him.

Back in Hamburg, she attracted the attention of the art gallery director Alfred Lichtwark as a painter of flowers and fruit. In line with Lichtwark's intentions, she worked primarily with the local flora rather than reproduce the overly popular, formulaic Makartbouquets (bouquets of artificial or dried flowers used for decoration, popular in Hans Makart's style of interior design).

Cramer exhibited her work at the Palace of Fine Arts and The Woman's Building at the 1893 World's Columbian Exposition in Chicago, Illinois.

From 1898, Cramer turned her attention to new subjects and worked on landscapes and portraits. Her style now became impressionistic. Nevertheless, floral still lifes still remained the focus of her work.

Via Lichtwark Cramer and her sister became acquainted with younger painters in Hamburg such as Ernst Eitner, Arthur Illies, and Paul Kayser, who founded the Hamburg Artists' Club in 1897. Both Cramer sisters exhibited their paintings together with them, but were not part of the Artists' Club.

In return, the Cramers' house became a meeting place for artists and art lovers. In addition, Molly Cramer promoted young artists by buying their works and also funded study tours for Ernst Eitner.

Cramer exhibited her paintings in Moscow, Budapest, London, and Chicago.

Towards the end of her life, she suffered a decline in her standard of living and was forced to sell paintings from her collection. She eventually lived with a younger relative and died on 18 January 1936 in Hamburg. The tombstones of Helene and Molly Cramer are at the Hamburg Ohlsdorf Cemetery in the Garden of Women.

== Selected works ==
- Goldlack und Primeln ("Wallflowers and primroses"), 1899, Oil on canvas (Kaiser Wilhelm Museum Krefeld)

== See also ==
- List of German painters
