= Helene Cramer =

German painter

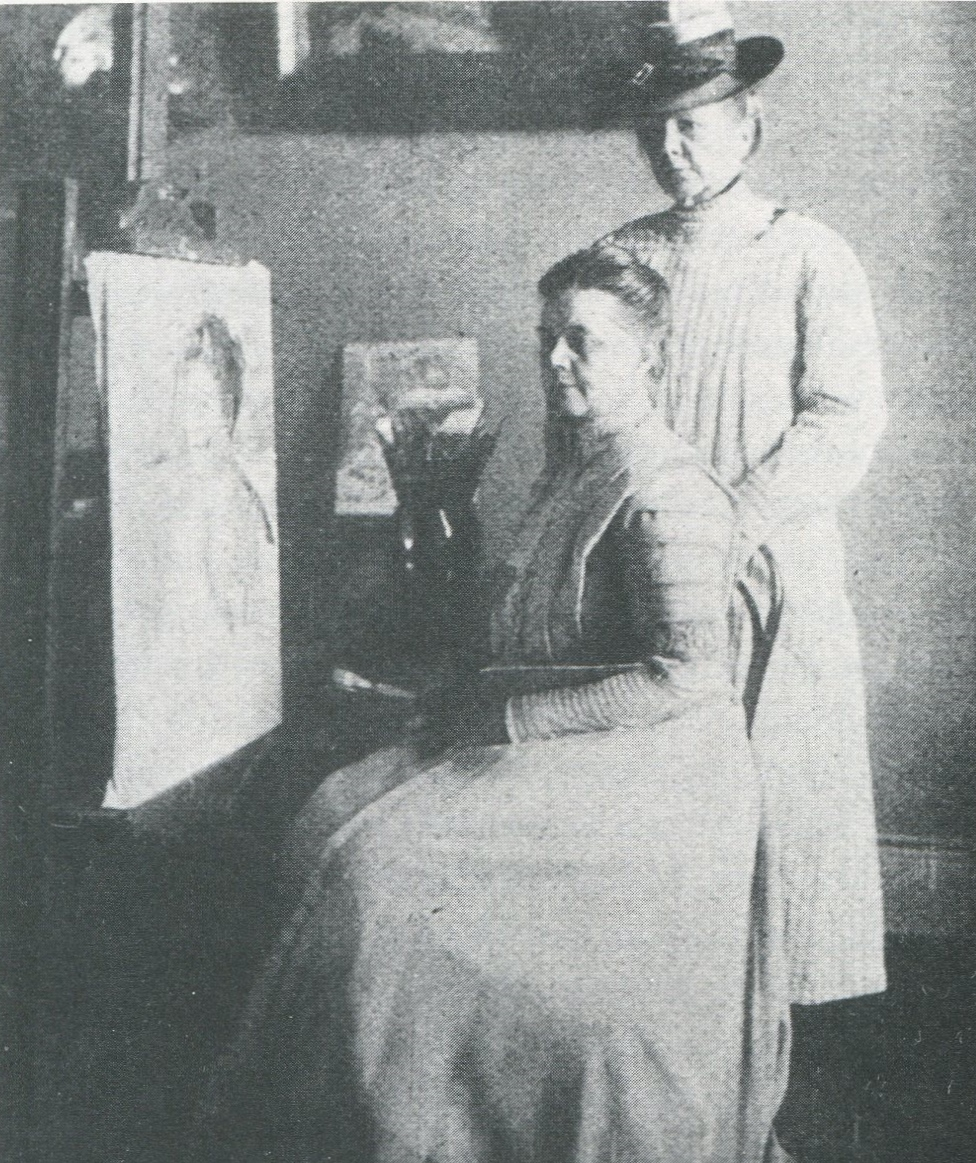
- Molly Cramer (in front) with her sister Helene in 1900
- Born: 13 December 1844; Free Imperial City of Hamburg
- Died: 14 April 1916 (aged 71); Hamburg, German Empire
- Education: Traditional Dutch school
- Known for: Still life paintings of flowers and fruits, landscapes, portraits
- Movement: Impressionism
- Patrons: Alfred Lichtwark

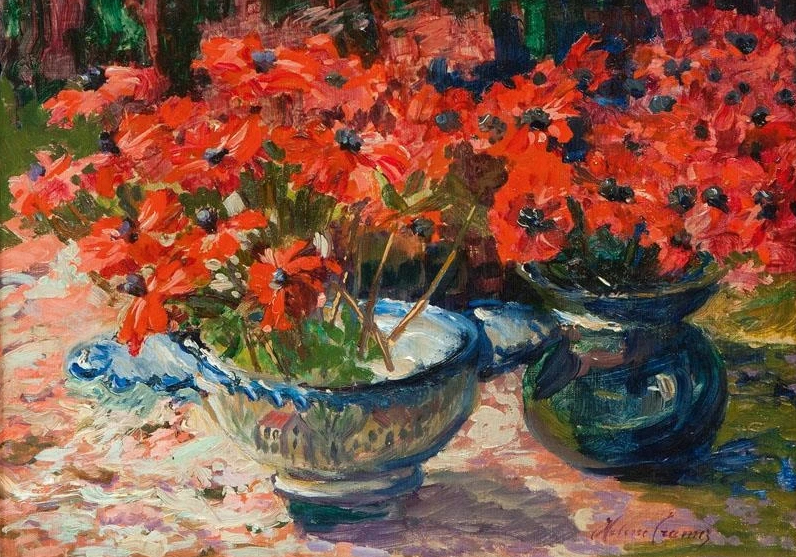
Still Life with Red Flowers

Helene Cramer (13 December 1844 – 14 April 1916) was a German flower, landscape and portrait painter.

== Life ==
Cramer came from a wealthy merchant family in Hamburg-Uhlenhorst. Like her sister, the painter Molly Cramer, she also began her training as a painter in 1882 after the death of their father Cesar Cramer. At the beginning of their studies Helene was 38 years old. The sisters first teachers were the Hamburg illustrator Theobald Riefesell as well as the painters Carl Rodeck and Carl Oesterley. At the end of the 1880s Helene Cramer went to The Hague to train under Margaretha Roosenboom and together with her sister at the Belgian still life painter Eugène Joors in Antwerp. Joors taught them in the art of still life painting.

Returning to Hamburg, Helene Cramer mainly painted still life flower pieces. Her works were regularly exhibited at major German exhibitions, such as at the Glass Palace Munich and the Great Berlin Art Exhibition (Große Berliner Kunstausstellung). In Berlin she exhibited several times between 1893 and 1908, always with her sister Molly. She also exhibited her work at the Palace of Fine Arts and The Woman's Building at the 1893 World's Columbian Exposition in Chicago, Illinois, and in 1900 at the Woman's Exhibition, Earl's Court, London with: Fir Forest; Trapäolum; Narzissen; Morgensonne im Wald; Gloxinien and Fuchsien.

In 1896 the director of the Kunsthalle Hamburg Alfred Lichtwark acquired some of the Cramer sister's pictures for the Collection of pictures from Hamburg. Lichtwark, who often frequented the sisters house at Uhlenhorst, also established contact with members of the Hamburg Artists' Club of 1897 (Hamburgischer Künstlerklub), including among others Ernst Eitner, Arthur Illies and Paul Kayser. Through visits by the artists in their house, this became an artistic achievement at the beginning of the 20th century. Without joining the club, the sisters later exhibited their paintings together with them.

Helene Cramer was a member of the Allgemeine Deutsche Kunstgenossenschaft, the Association of North-West German Artists, in the Berlin Association of Women Artists and in the Association of (Women) Authors and Artists of Vienna.

Helene Cramer died in 1916 in her 72nd year, the gravestones of Helene and Molly Cramer are in the Garden of Women at the Hamburg Ohlsdorf Cemetery.

== See also ==
- List of German painters
- List of German women artists
