= Osterley (disambiguation) =

Osterley is a district in London.

Osterley may also refer to:

== Places ==
- Osterley, New South Wales, a settlement in Australia
- Osterley tube station, an underground station in west London

== Ships ==
- Osterley (East Indiaman)
- SS Osterley

== See also ==
- Osterley Park, in London
- Osterley Television Centre (also known as the Sky Campus), in London
- Oesterley, a surname
