= Hans von Bartels =

German painter

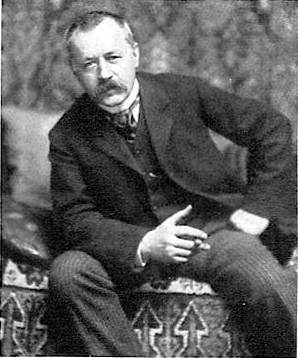
Hans von Bartels

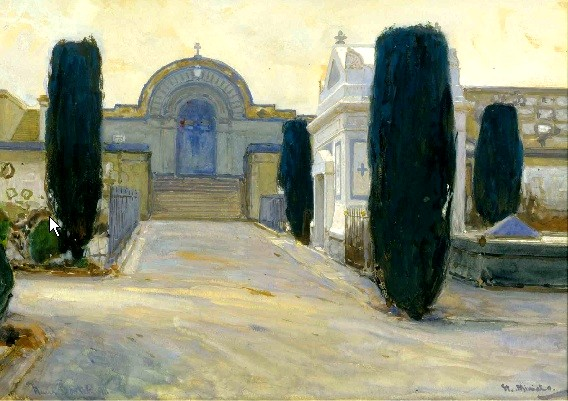
The Cemetery from the Basilica di San Miniato al Monte

Hans von Bartels (25 December 1856 – 5 October 1913) was a German painter.

== Life ==
He was born in Hamburg, the son of Dr N. F. F. von Bartels, a Russian government official. He studied first under the marine painter R. Hardorff in Hamburg, then under C. Schweitzer in Düsseldorf and Carl Oesterley in Hamburg, and finally at the Berlin School of Art. After travelling extensively, especially in Italy, he settled in Munich in 1885 and was appointed professor of painting in 1891. He died in Munich.

Bartels is associated with the Düsseldorf school of painting. Although an oil painter of great power, he is also one of the leading German water-colour painters, mainly of marines and scenes of fishing life, painted with rude vigour and a great display of technical skill. Bartels made a great contribution to the development of the watercolour. He was the first to use watercolour paint of large formats without the earlier conventions. From 1887 Von Bartels came every summer to the Dutch coast, especially to Katwijk aan Zee, to paint the fisherfolk and their labour. He excels in storm scenes and in depicting the strong, healthy fishing-folk of the northern coasts. He became an honorary member of leading English, German, Dutch, Belgian and Austrian art societies.

== Legacy ==
Among his principal works are:

- "Lonely Beach"
- "Potato Harvest—Rügen"
- "Storm—Bornholm"
- "Moonlight on the Zuyder Zee"

He has paintings in public collections in London and Paisley.

== See also ==
- List of German painters
