= Oesterley =

Oesterley, a surname of German origin, may refer to:

- Carl Wilhelm Friedrich Oesterley (1805–1891), German painter and art historian
- Carl August Heinrich Ferdinand Oesterley (1839–1930), German landscape painter
- Hermann Oesterley (1834–1891), German historian
- Marie Oesterley (1842–1917), German painter
- William Oscar Emil (W.O.E.) Oesterley (1866–1950), British theologian
