= Alma del Banco =

German painter

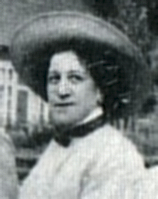
- Del Banco in 1897
- Born: 24 December 1862; Free and Hanseatic City of Hamburg, German Confederation
- Died: 8 March 1943 (aged 80); Hamburg, Nazi Germany
- Known for: Painting

Alma Aline Henriette del Banco (1862-1943) was a German modernist painter of Jewish ancestry.

== Life and work ==
She came from an assimilated Jewish family. Her father, Eduard Moses del Banco (1810–1881), ran a business selling tobacco products, pig bristles, horse hair and bed feathers. Her mother, Therese Vallentin (1824–1884), was from Sweden. At the age of thirty, after practicing various handicrafts, she turned to painting. From 1895 to 1905, she studied at a private women's art school operated by Valeska Röver. Her instructors there included Ernst Eitner and Arthur Illies.

At the beginning of World War I, she moved to Paris, where she studied with André Lhote and Fernand Léger. There, she was exposed to Cubism and Expressionism. She returned to Hamburg after the war and became a freelance artist. From 1919, she lived with her half-brother, Siegmund (1856-1938), who was also unmarried. Later that year, she became one of the founding members of the "Hamburgische Sezession". The following year, she joined the Deutscher Künstlerbund. During the 1920s, she made numerous painting trips to Italy and the Balkans, accompanied by her fellow artist, Gretchen Wohlwill.

Going into the 1930s, her style was more detailed, and she had become a sought-after portrait painter. Unfortunately, she soon began to feel the effects of Germany's increasing Anti-Semitism. In 1933, she was excluded from participating in the "Hamburgische Künstlerschaft". The Sezession dissolved itself, rather than expel its Jewish members. In 1937, thirteen of her paintings were confiscated from the Hamburger Kunsthalle as part of the government's "Degenerate Art" campaign. Nine were destroyed. The following year, she was banned from the Reich Chamber of Culture, and was forbidden to take part in any exhibitions.

When Siegmund died, it became necessary to move. She was able to share an apartment with her brother-in-law, Hans Lübbert, a civil servant who had been forced to resign from his positions in the local fishing industry. Shortly after, she was placed under house arrest. During this time, she began to suffer from heart problems, and was too weak to consider emigrating. When she found herself facing deportation to Theresienstadt, she committed suicide with an overdose of morphine.

She was interred in the Lübbert family plot at Ohlsdorf Cemetery. A memorial Stolperstein has been placed in front of her last residence. In 1985, a small street was named after her in Hamburg's Bergedorf district.

== Selected paintings ==
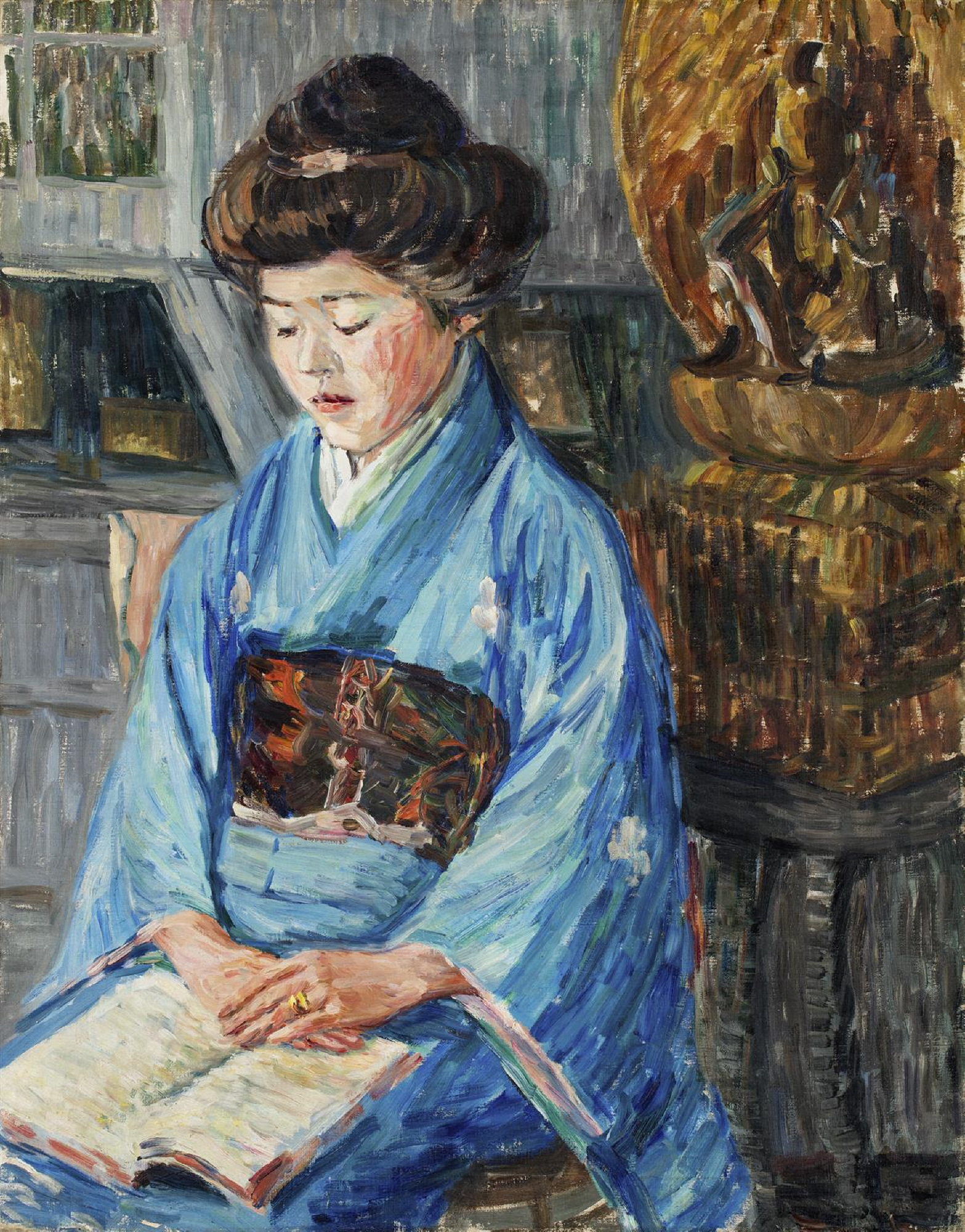
Japanese Woman (1910)

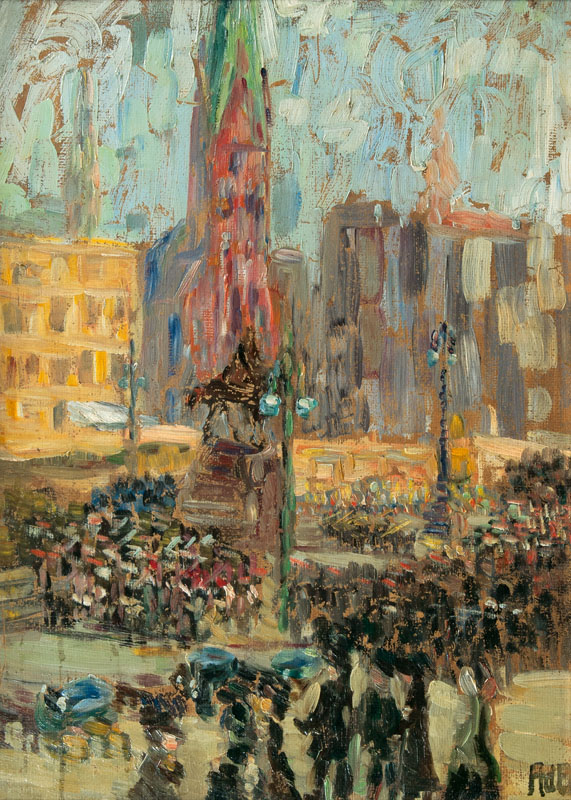
Hamburg (c.1912)

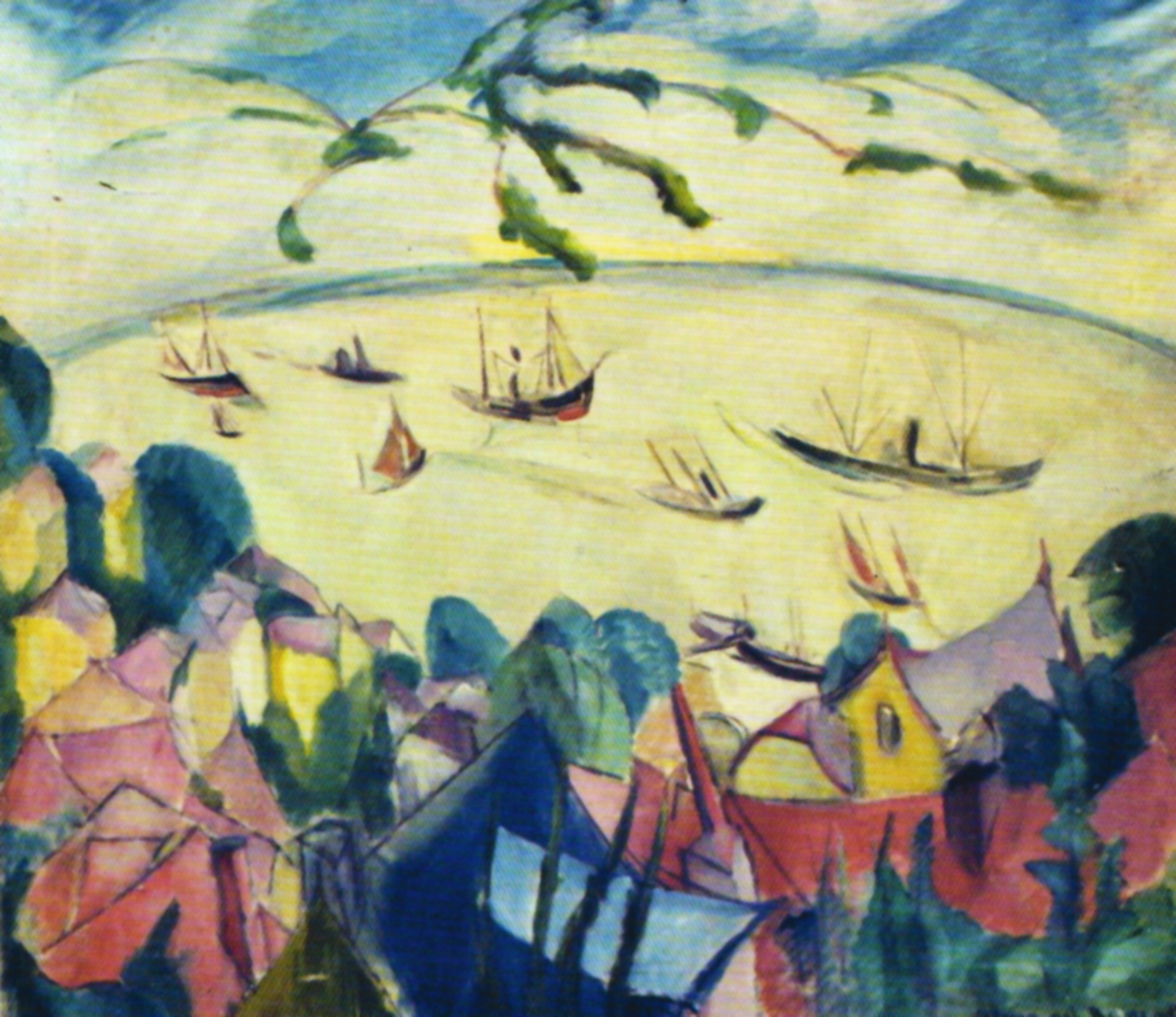
View of the Elbe from the Süllberg Terrace in Blankenese (1918)

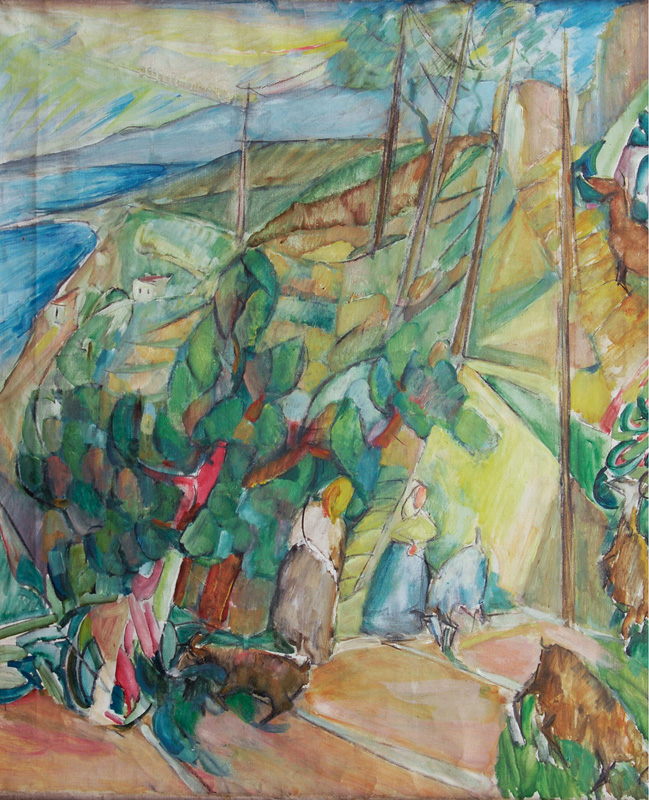
Taormina (1918–1922)

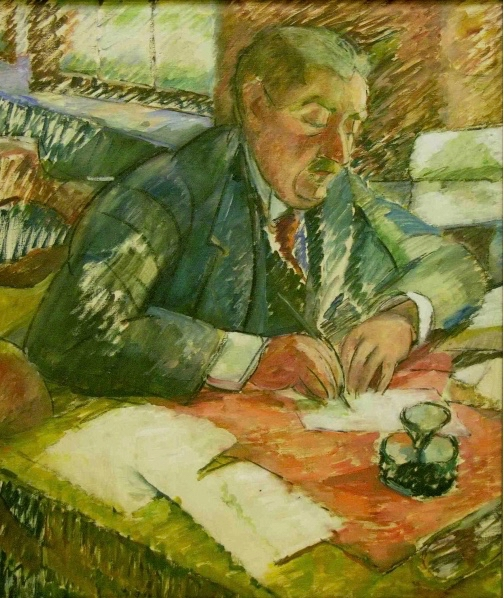
August Wilhelm Hunzinger (1920)

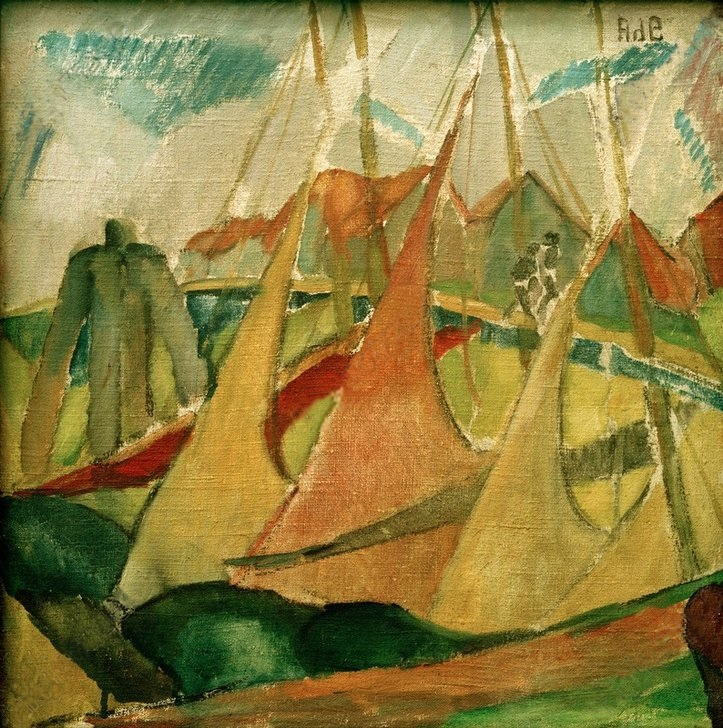
Red and Yellow Sails (c.1922)

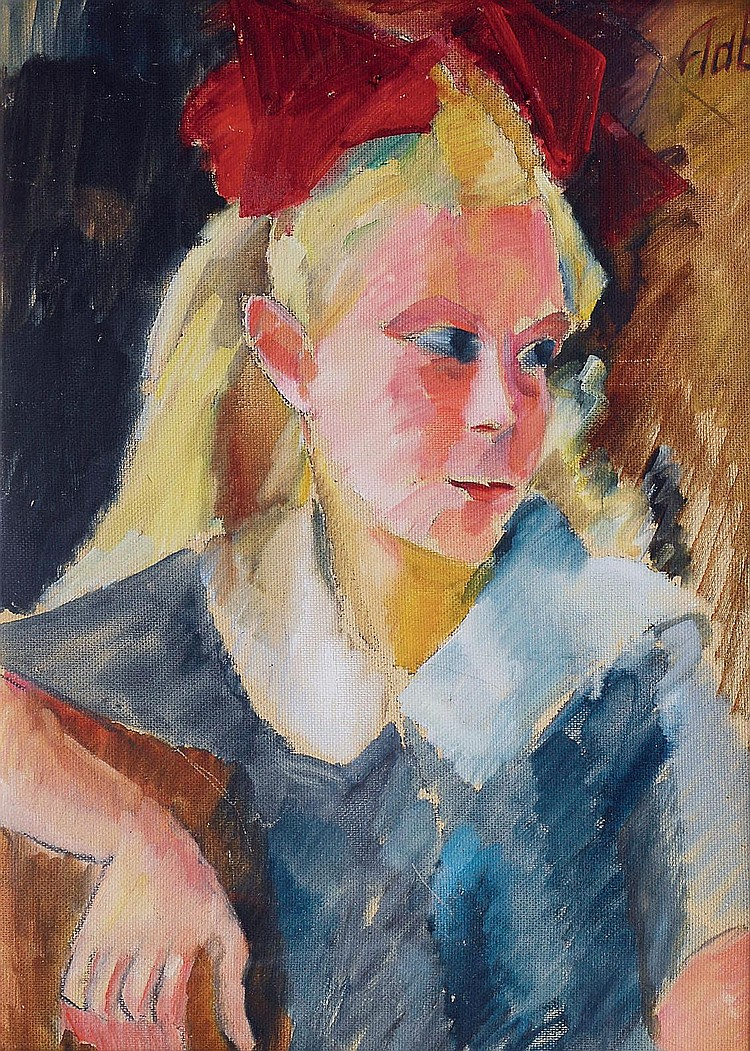
Girl with a Red Ribbon (1925)

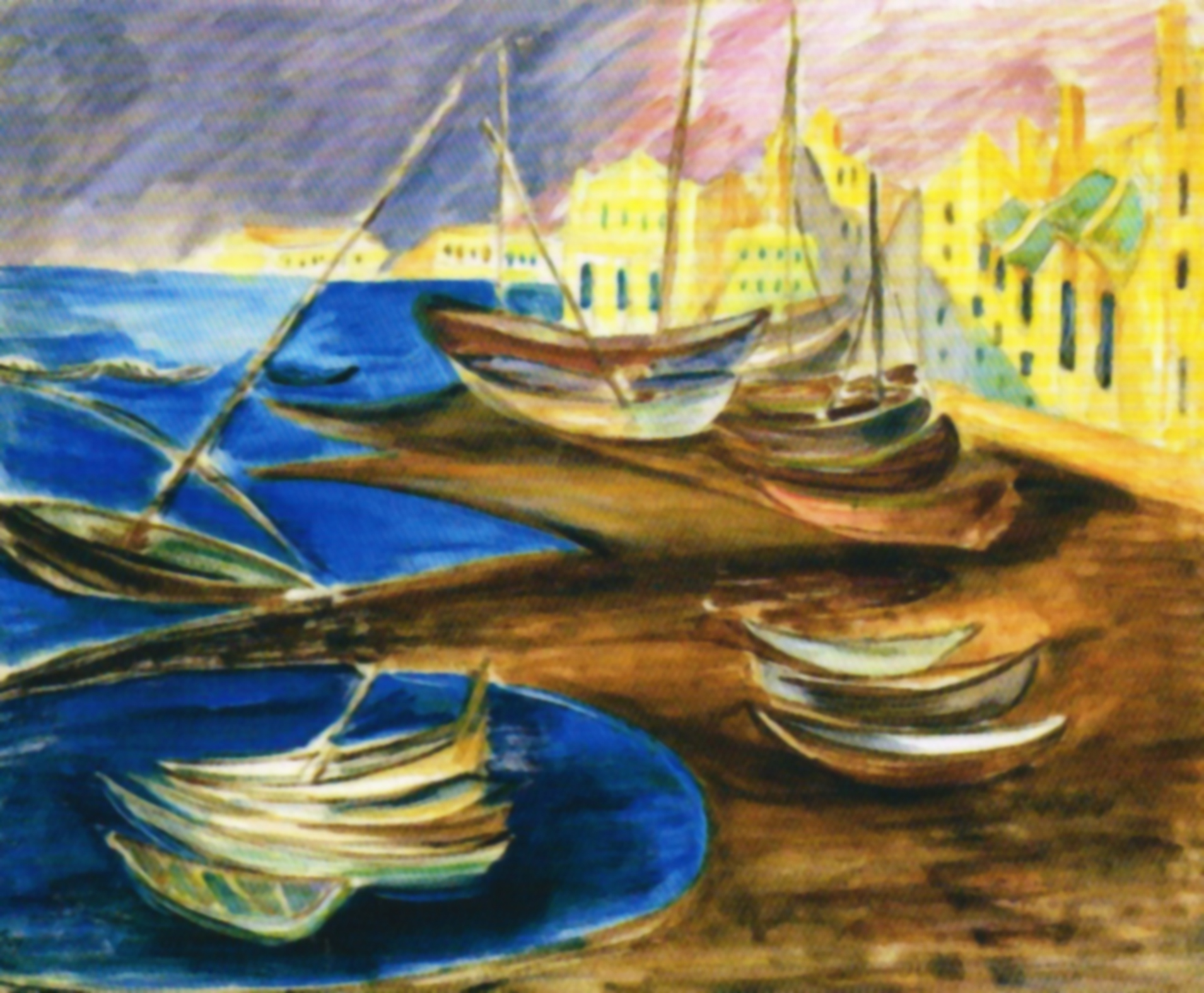
Fishing Boats in the Harbor (c.1925)

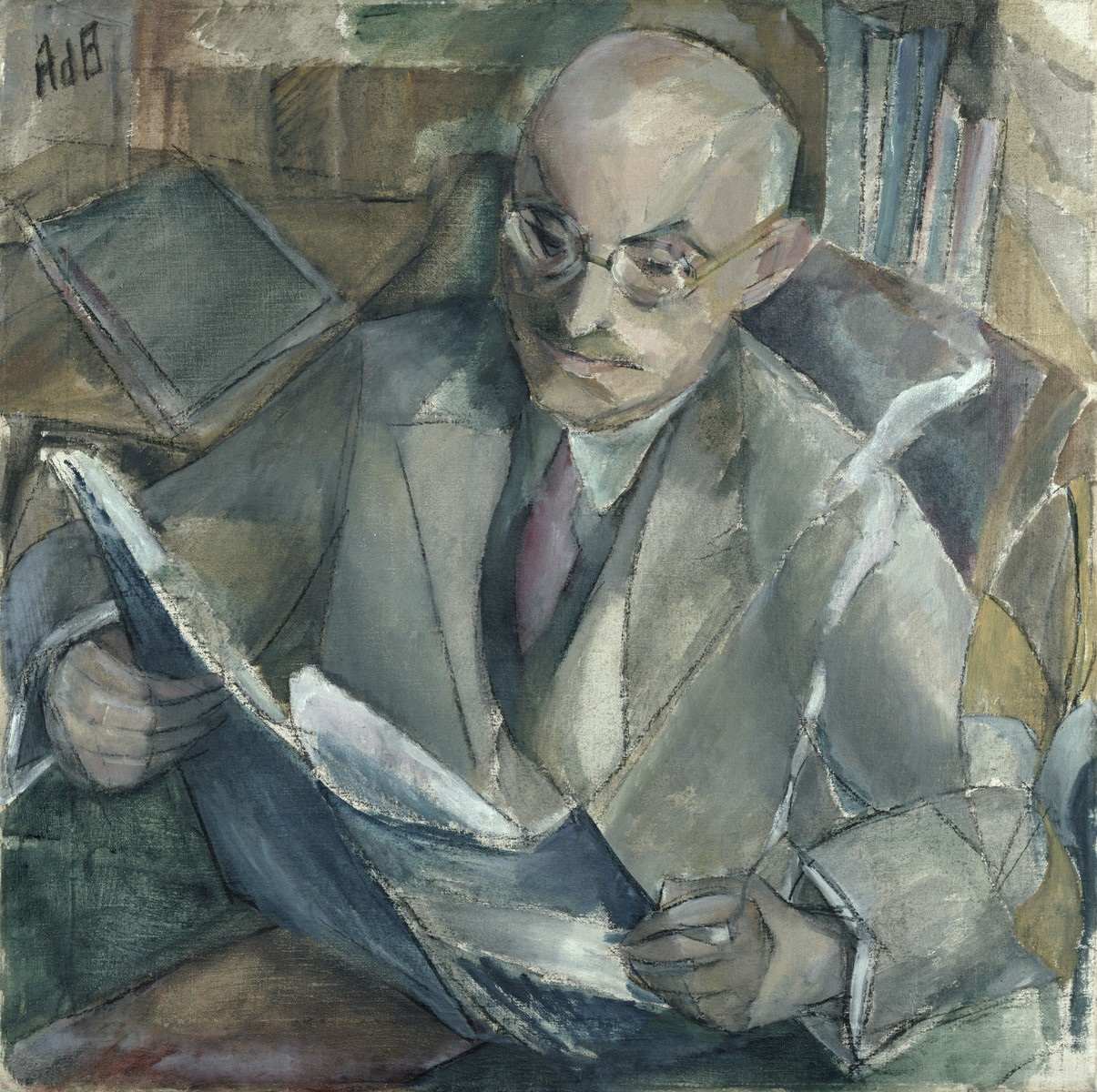
Portrait of Dr. Georg Ludwig Wendemuth (c. 1922)
