= Valeska Röver =

German painter (1849–1931)

Valeska Röver (6 February 1849 – 31 March 1931) was a German painter. Röver started an art school for women in her home town of Hamburg.

== Life ==
Röver was born in Hamburg in 1849. She was a student of the impressionist Franz Skarbina and she took lessons in Paris at the Académie Julian. She is known for starting an art school for women in Hamburg. At the time women were banned from existing art schools. Her students included Gerda Koppel and Alma del Banco and the teachers at her school included Alfred Lichtwark, Ernst Eitner and Arthur Illies.

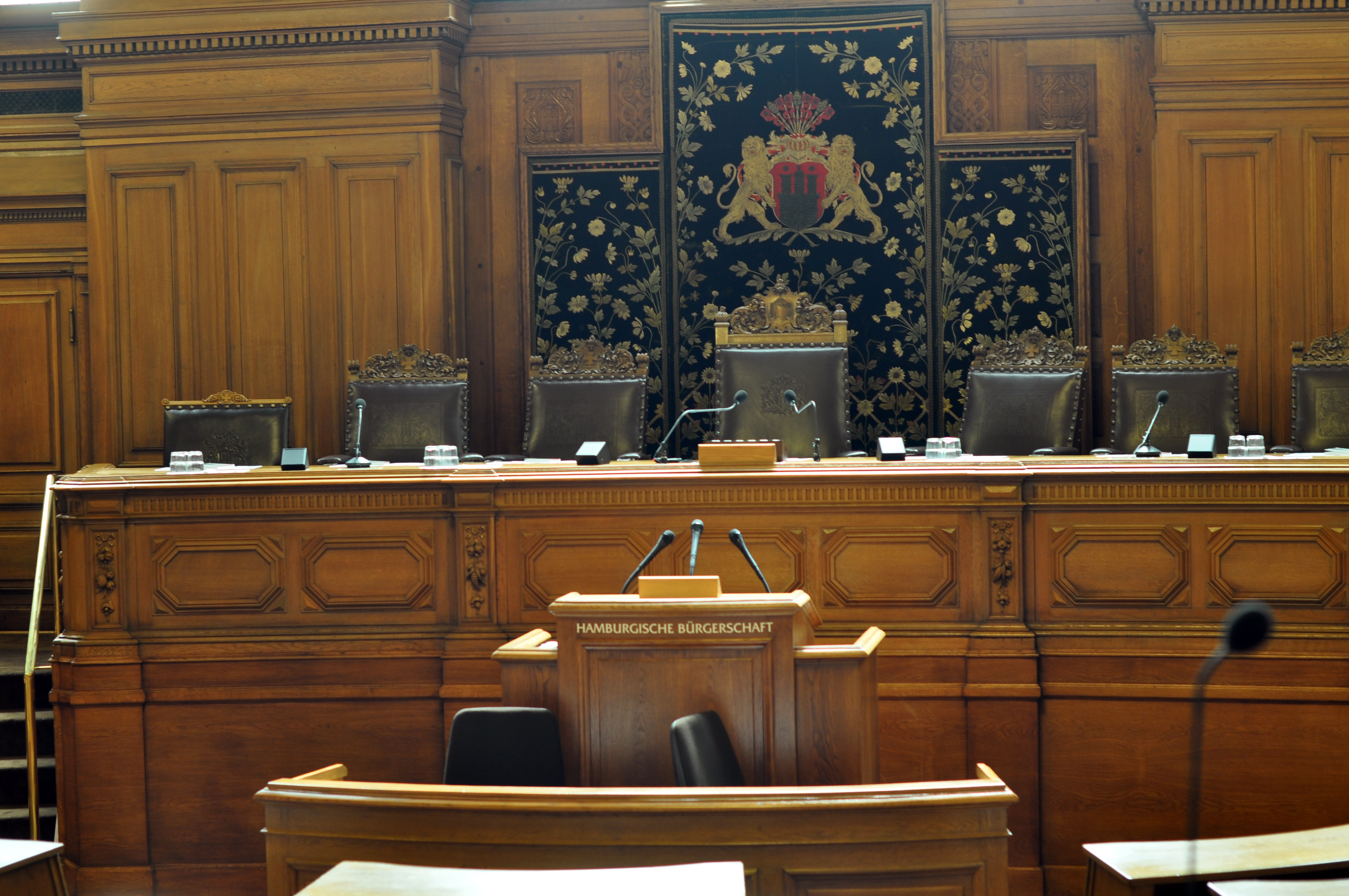
The embroidered hangings behind the President's chair in the Hamburger Bürgerschaft are by Valeska Röver

She painted still lifes of flowers and fruits. Valeska Röver was also commissioned to create embroidered hangings behind the chairs of the mayor in the council chamber (Senate enclosure) of the Hamburg City Hall and the president in the Hamburg Parliament. She also created altar vestments for St. James' Church in Hamburg.
