= Carl Rodeck =

German painter

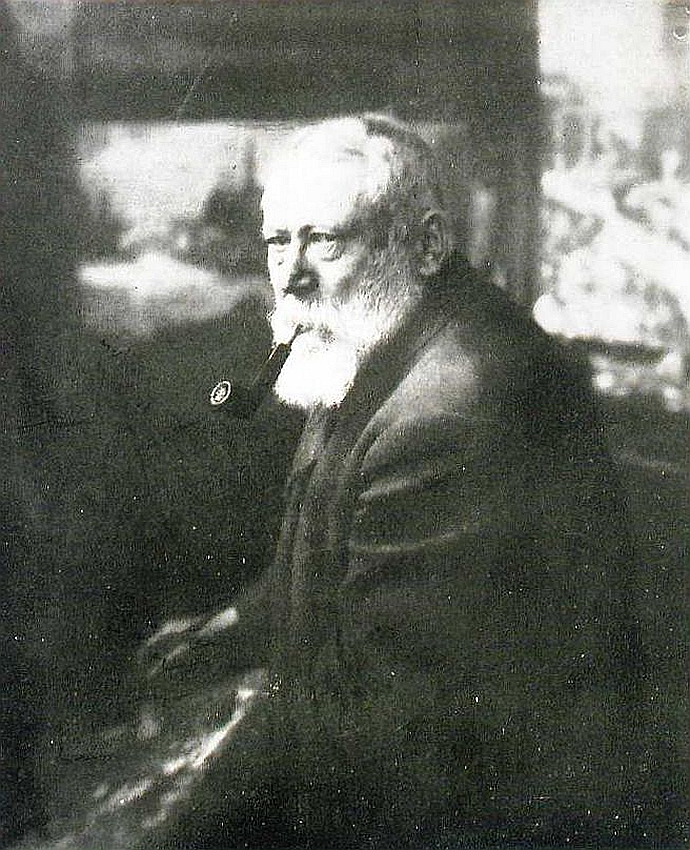
- Carl Rodeck - Self portrait
- Born: 13 September 1841; Emden, Kingdom of Hanover
- Died: 14 April 1909 (aged 67); Hamburg, Germany
- Known for: landscapes, marine, portrait

Carl Rodeck (13 September 1841 – 14 April 1909) was a German landscape, marine and portrait painter.

== Early life and education ==
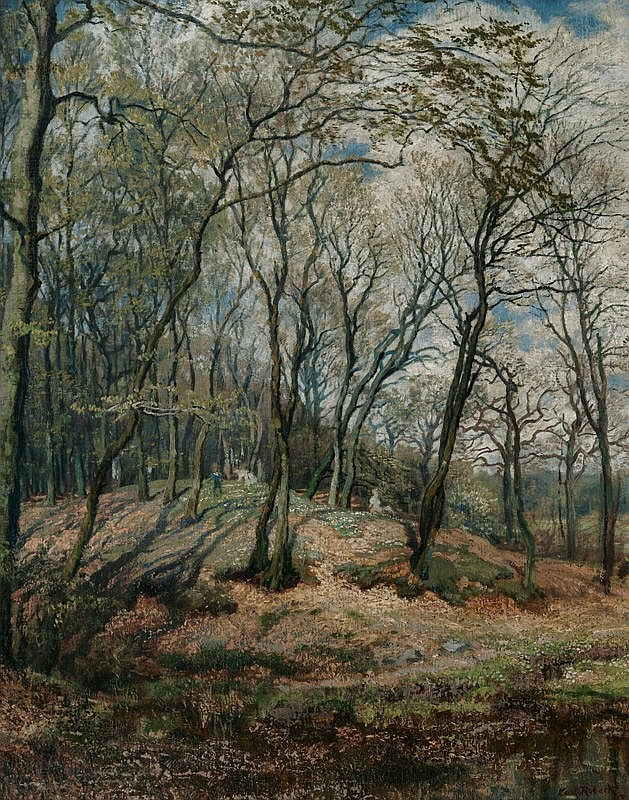
Frühling im Walde (Spring in the forest)

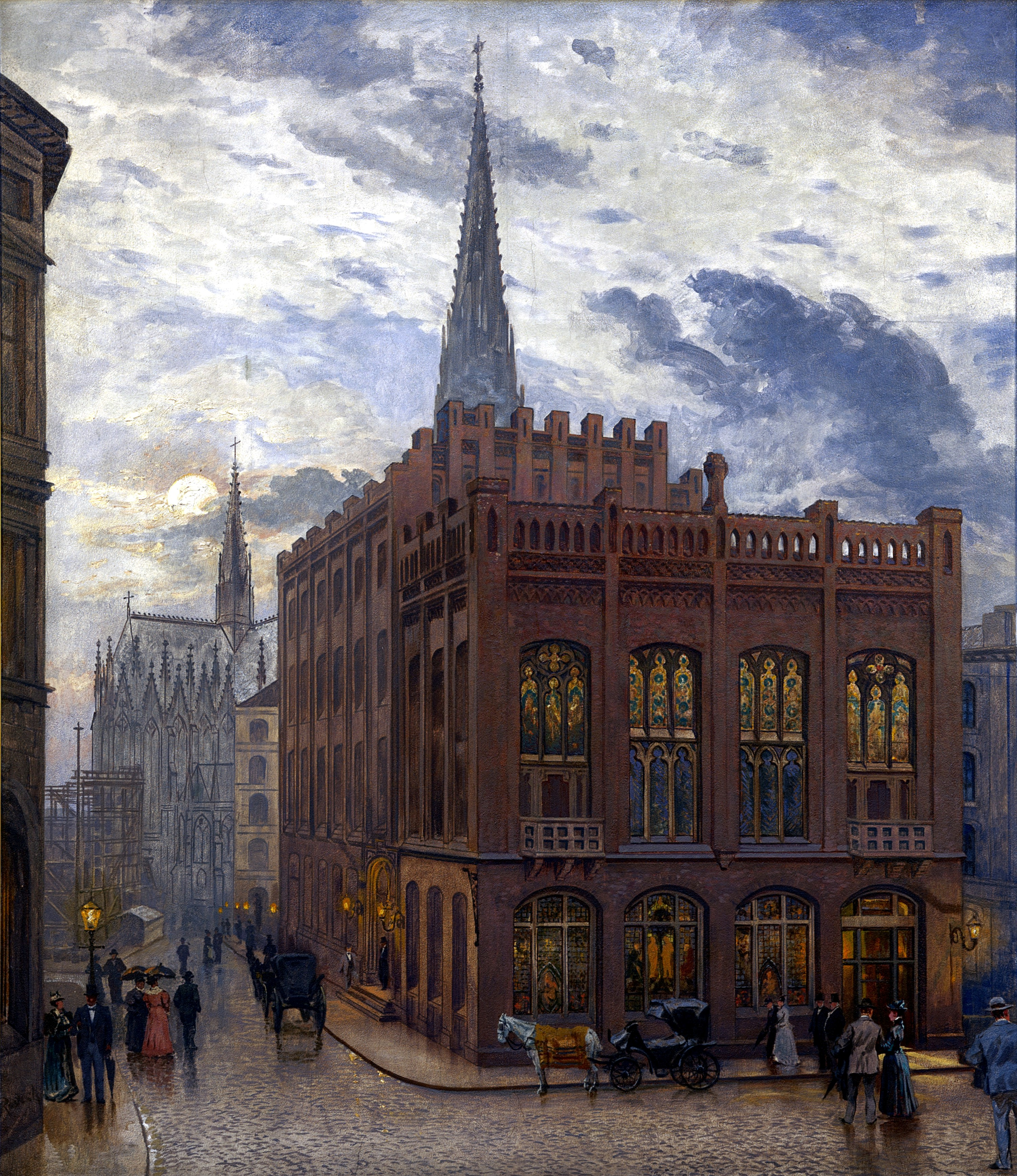
Gebäude der Patriotischen Gesellschaft (Building of the Patriotic Society), 1897, Hamburg Rathaus

His father was a lithographer and, in 1842, his family moved to Hamburg to open their own shop. From 1863 to 1866, he studied under Arnold Böcklin, Ferdinand Pauwels and Alexander Michelis at the Weimar Saxon Grand Ducal Art School. After a brief return to Hamburg in 1869, prompted by his father's illness, he went to Berlin for further studies then, in 1871, went back to Hamburg, where he took up permanent residence.

== Career ==
After his father's death he closed the shop and devoted himself entirely to painting.

He quickly found the themes for his works; mainly oil paintings or watercolors. He portrayed the German forest, the landscape of the Lower Elbe and the old harbor neighborhood of Hamburg and was constantly on the road with a sketch pad or easel. In 1869 the Hamburger Kunstverein had been his first customer, and continued to buy his works throughout the 1870s. He was represented in all the major exhibitions, including Hamburg and Hanover, and later in Berlin, Dresden and Munich. He also exhibited in Vienna and London. In later years, he became increasingly interested in portrait painting.

Study trips took him to Norway. Together with his friend Carl Oesterley he visited the Netherlands, Belgium and England, where he had relatives by marriage. (His brother was the brother-in-law of the Frisian-English painter Lawrence Alma-Tadema.) As a further source of income he gave private lessons in drawing and painting for young women from Hamburg's upper classes.

== Personal life ==
His students included the sisters Molly Cramer and Helene Cramer, as well as his later wife Maria Hastedt (the daughter of a Hamburg architect) whom he married in 1888.

In 1907, after several strokes, he retired from painting. He died on 14 April 1909. His corpse was cremated, and the urn was placed at the Ohlsdorf Cemetery.

== Selected works ==
- Angler an einem Teich im Wald (Angler at a pond in the forest), (Art Gallery and Museum, Glasgow)
- Waldlandschaft (forest landscape), 1880
- Mittagsruhe - Schafherde im Wald (Noon rest - sheep herd in the forest), 1881
- Fischerdorf in der Nähe Hamburgs (Fishing village near Hamburg), 1881
- Abend auf der Elbe unterhalb Hamburg (Evening on the Elbe below Hamburg), 1888
