= Eugène Joors =

Belgian painter

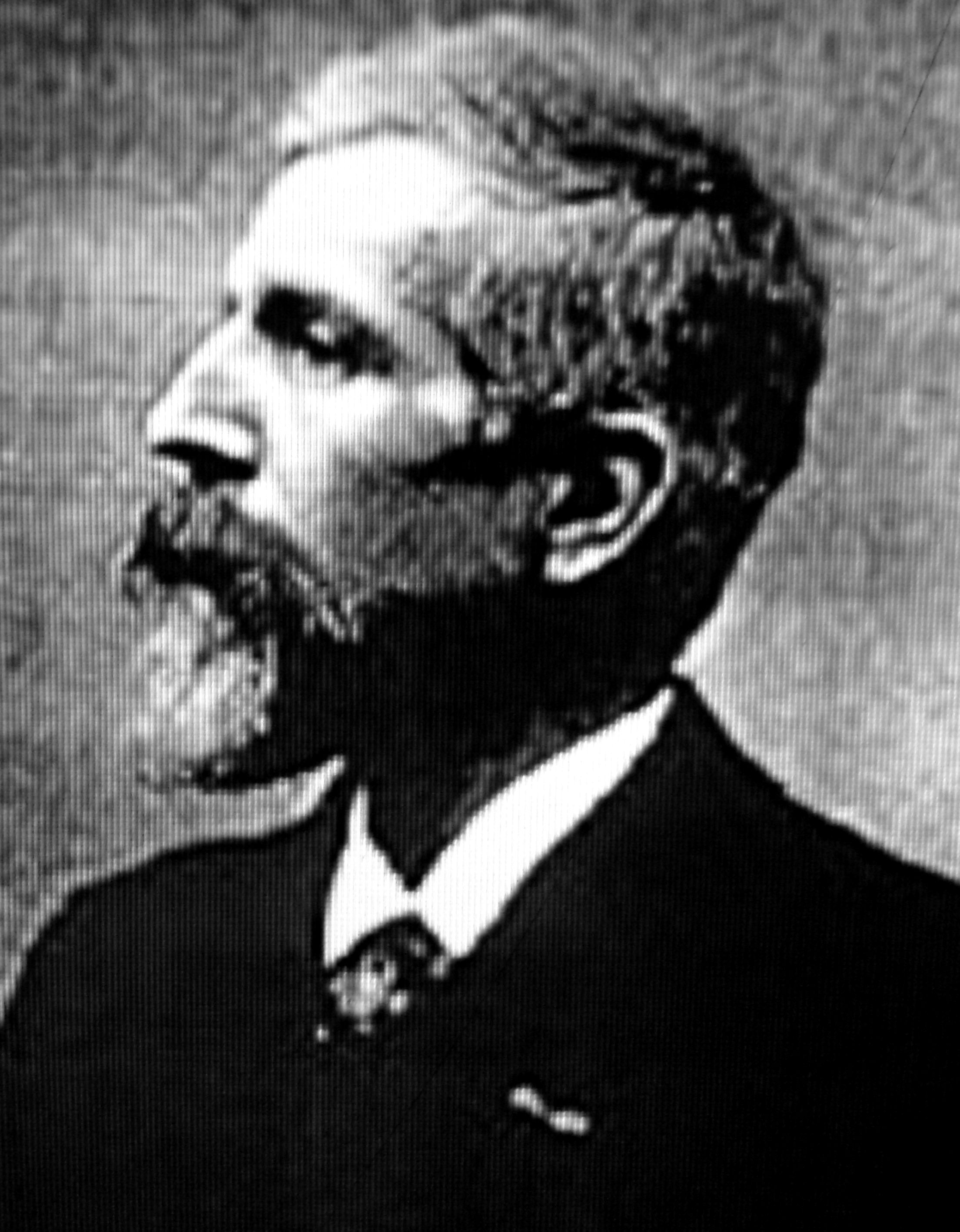
- Born: Eugène Joors; February 20, 1850; Borgerhout, Belgium
- Died: October 23, 1910 (aged 60); Berchem, Belgium
- Education: Royal Academy of Fine Arts of Antwerp
- Occupation: Painter

Eugène Joors (20 February 1850, Borgerhout - 23 October 1910, Berchem), was a Belgian painter in the realistic style.

== Life and work ==
He studied from 1865 to 1870 at the Royal Academy of Fine Arts of Antwerp, where his teacher were Polydore Beaufaux, Nicaise de Keyser and Jozef Van Lerius. In 1886, he became a teacher of still-life painting, in cooperation with his friend Frans Mortelmans. Among his pupils was the German painter Helene Cramer. He executed both the traditional, carefully arranged still lifes and the more natural-appearing floral variety as well as a great variety of landscapes, portraits and genre scenes.

From 1879, he was a regular exhibitor in Antwerp and abroad, receiving a gold medal at a show in Munich where one of his paintings was bought by Prince Luitpold. He also assisted Charles Verlat in producing his famous panorama of the Battle of Waterloo.

He was awarded the Order of Leopold and a street in Borgerhout is named after him.

== Selected paintings ==
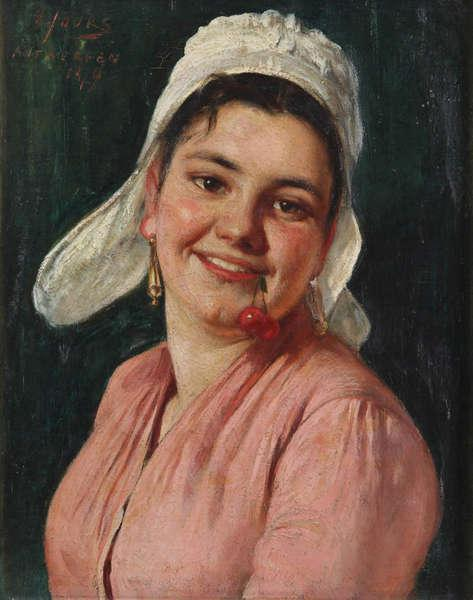
A Girl with Cherries (1879)

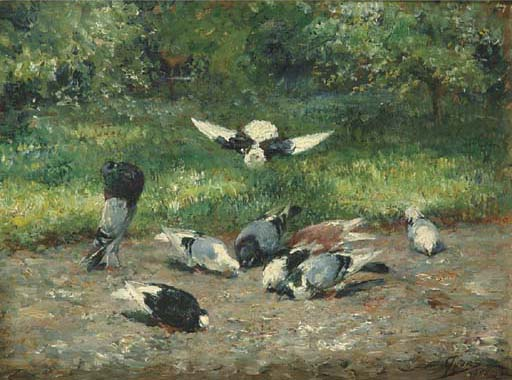
Pigeons (1885)

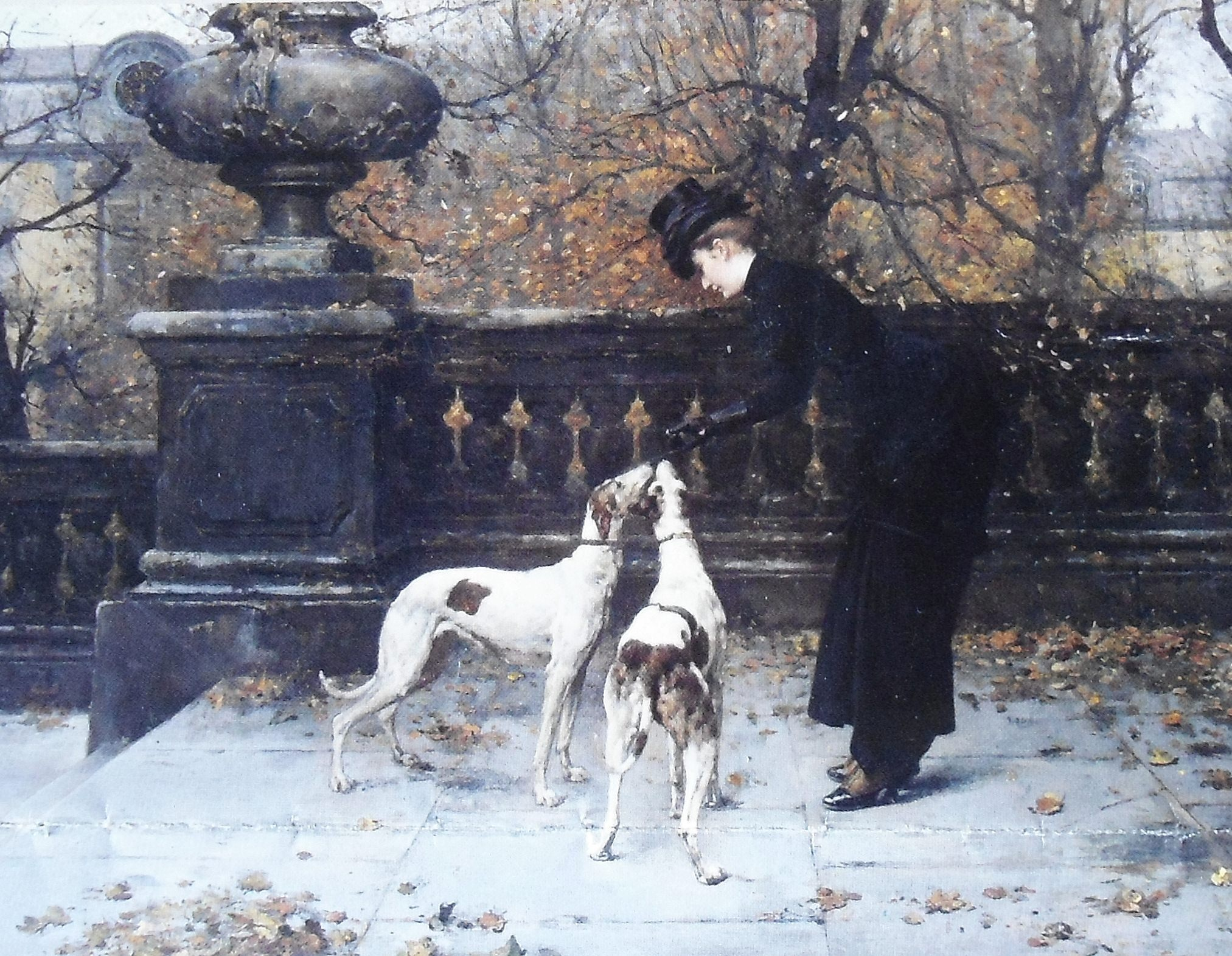
The Reward (1886)

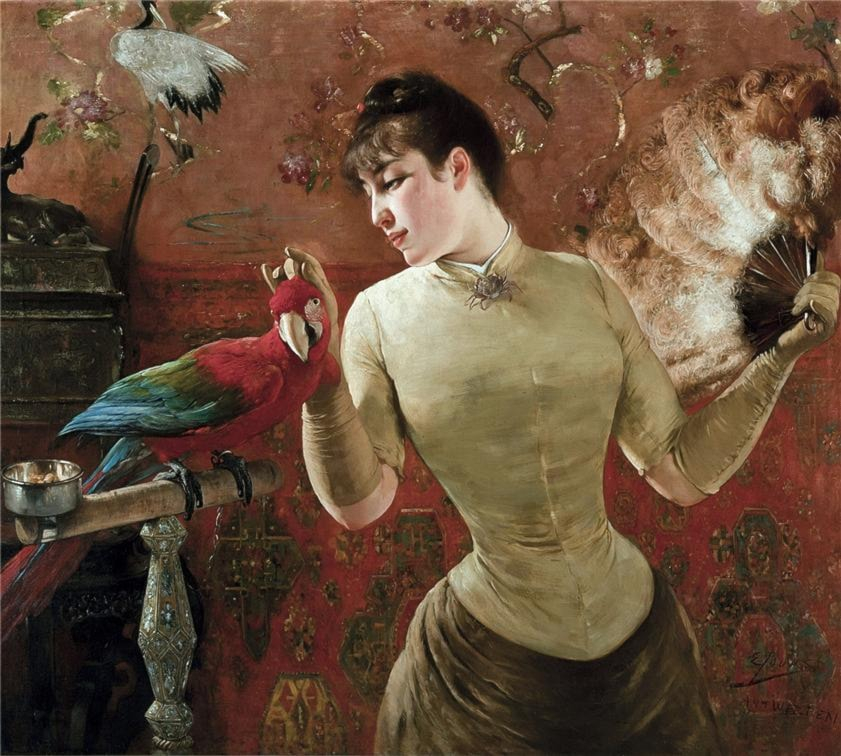
Lady with Parrot (c.1890)
