= Osterley (East Indiaman) =

Three ships with the name Osterley served the British East India Company (EIC) as an East Indiaman between 1758 and 1800:

- Osterley (1757 EIC ship), a ship of 642 tons (bm) launched in October 1757 by Perry, Blackwall. She made four voyages for the company. In 1770 her owners sold her into the North American timber trade. On 12 October 1771 she was returning from Piscataqua with a cargo of masts when she stranded at Hurst Castle, on the Solent. She was refloated and taken to Portsmouth where she was surveyed. On 20 October she was condemned and sold for breaking up
- Osterley (1771 EIC ship) was launched on 9 October 1771 by Wells, Deptford. She made two voyages for the company before the French frigate Pourvoyeuse captured her on 21 February 1779 while she was on her third voyage.
- Osterley (1780 EIC ship) a ship of 775 tons (bm) launched in 1780 that made seven voyages for the EIC, and though the French captured her in 1799 on her last voyage, the British recaptured her, allowing her in 1800 to return to Britain.

Osterley was originally named for Osterley Park, the home of the Child family, owners of Child & Co., a private bank that financed EIC voyages and ships. Francis Child III was an investor in the first Osterley. At least one other notable later vessel, Osterley (1909 ship), has also borne the name.
