= Carl Oesterley =

German painter and art historian

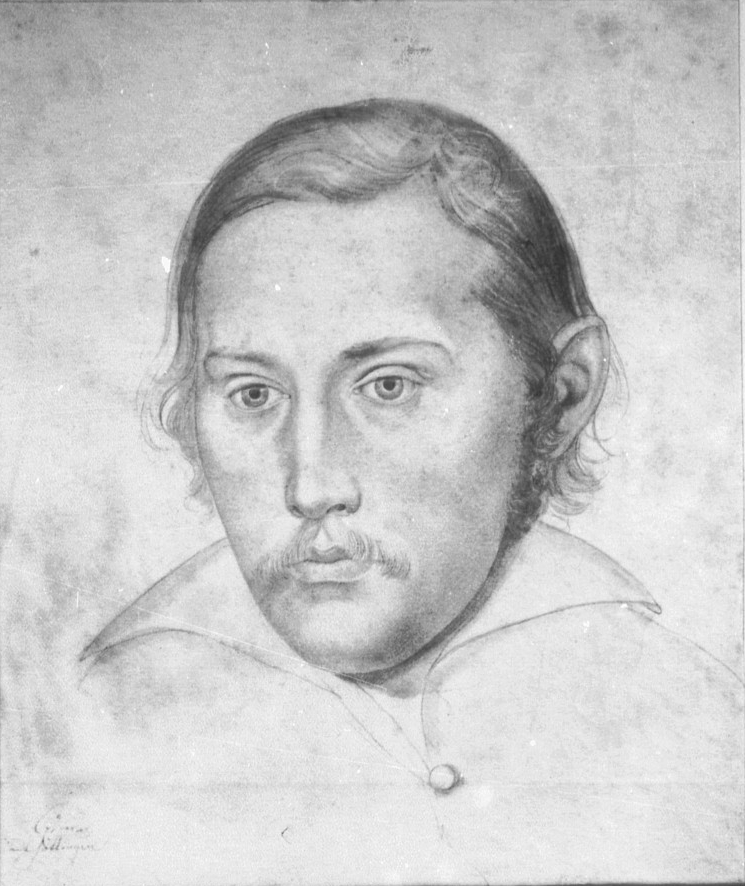
Carl Oesterley, by Adolf Zimmermann

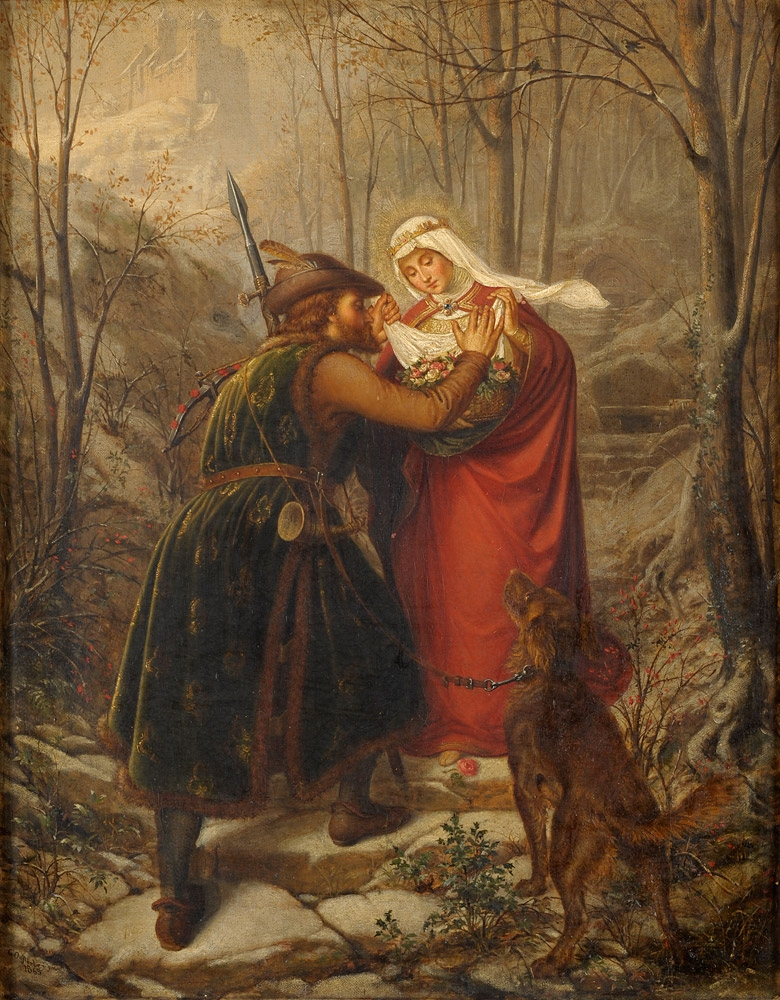
Elizabeth of Hungary and the Miracle of the Roses (1869)

Carl Wilhelm Friedrich Oesterley (22 June 1805 – 29 March 1891) was a German painter and art historian. He is remembered largely for creating oil paintings with Biblical themes.

== Biography ==
He was a native of Göttingen, and studied archaeology, philosophy and history at the University of Göttingen, where in 1824 he earned his doctorate in the field of art history. Subsequently he studied drawing in Dresden, where he was a student of Johann Gottlob Matthäi (1753–1832). He then spent several years in Rome (1824–29).

In 1831, he became a professor of art history at Göttingen, where he collaborated with Karl Otfried Müller (1797-1840) on the treatise Denkmäler der alten Kunst (Monuments of Ancient Art). During this time period, he extended his artistic studies in Düsseldorf (1835–38 under Friedrich Wilhelm Schadow), Munich (where he studied the frescoes of Peter von Cornelius) and Paris (1842).

In 1842, Oesterley became a full professor of art, and in 1844, after finishing the painting Christus and Ahasuerus, he was appointed court painter of the Kingdom of Hanover. Beginning in 1852 he produced numerous altarpieces and other works of art for the church in Rosdorf, in Molzen near the town of Uelzen, and also in Bad Iburg.

== Selected paintings ==
- Die Tochter Jephthas, (The Daughter of Jephtha), (1836)
- Die Himmelfahrt Christi, Fresko der Schlosskirche in Hannover, (The Ascension of Christ, Fresco of the Schlosskirche in Hanover), (1838)
- Christus, die Kinder segnend, (Christ blessing the Children), (1841)
- Szene aus Bürgers Lenore, (Scene from Bürger's "Lenore")
- Dornröschen, (Sleeping Beauty), (1861)
- Christus als Erlöser, ehemaliges Altarbild für die Evangelisch-lutherische Schlosskirche in Bad Iburg als Geschenk von König Georg V. (Christ the Redeemer, a former altarpiece for the Evangelical Lutheran Castle Church in Bad Iburg as a gift of George V of Hanover).

== Family ==
He was the father of landscape painter Carl August Heinrich Ferdinand Oesterley.
