= Paul Kayser =

German painter (1869–1942)

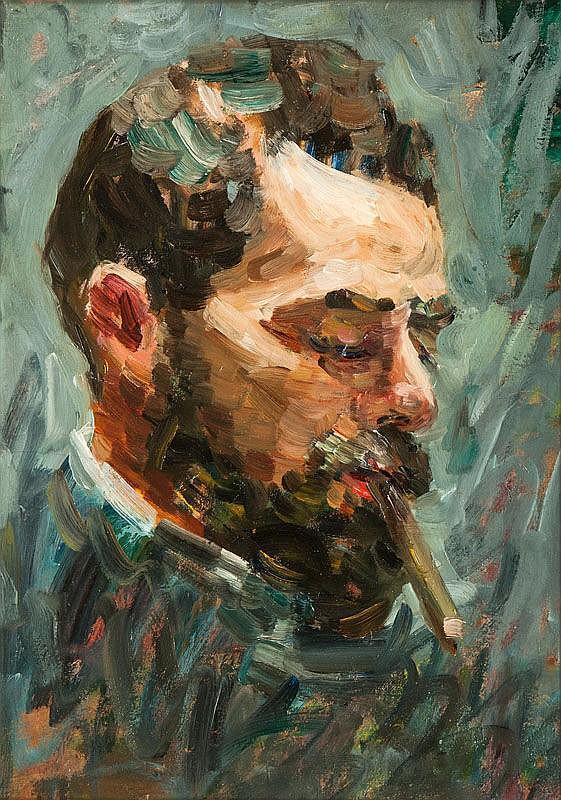
Paul Kayser; portrait by Alma del Banco (C.1916)

Paul Kayser (22 September 1869, in Hamburg – 23 September 1942, in Donaueschingen) was a German painter and graphic artist.

== Biography ==
He began with an apprenticeship as a decorative painter at the firm of Wirth & Bay then, from 1886 to 1889, attended the Königliche Kunstgewerbeschule München, followed by the Kunstgewerbeschule Dresden. From 1890 to 1894, he worked as a decorative painter in Hamburg.

In 1902, he married Melanie Hertz, daughter of the physicist Heinrich Hertz, and they had two children. At that time, he was a private art teacher.

From 1906 to 1939 (interrupted by service in Schleswig during World War I) he taught at the art school operated by Gerda Koppel. Due to the destruction resulting from World War II, he left Hamburg in 1941 to settle in Donaueschingen, on the Swiss border, where he died one year later.

He was a founding member of the Hamburgischer Künstlerklub and, from 1897, a participant in the Hamburgische Sezession, a group of young artists and writers, modelled on the Munich Secession. He was also a member of the Altonaer Künstlerverein. His style was heavily influenced by Albert Marquet, whom he had met in 1909, and reunited with during a trip to Paris in 1933. His notable works include two large paintings that were created as decorations for the ocean liner SS Imperator.

His works were part of a major exhibition in 2019: Hamburger Schule – Das 19. Jahrhundert neu entdeckt at the Hamburger Kunsthalle.

== Selected paintings ==
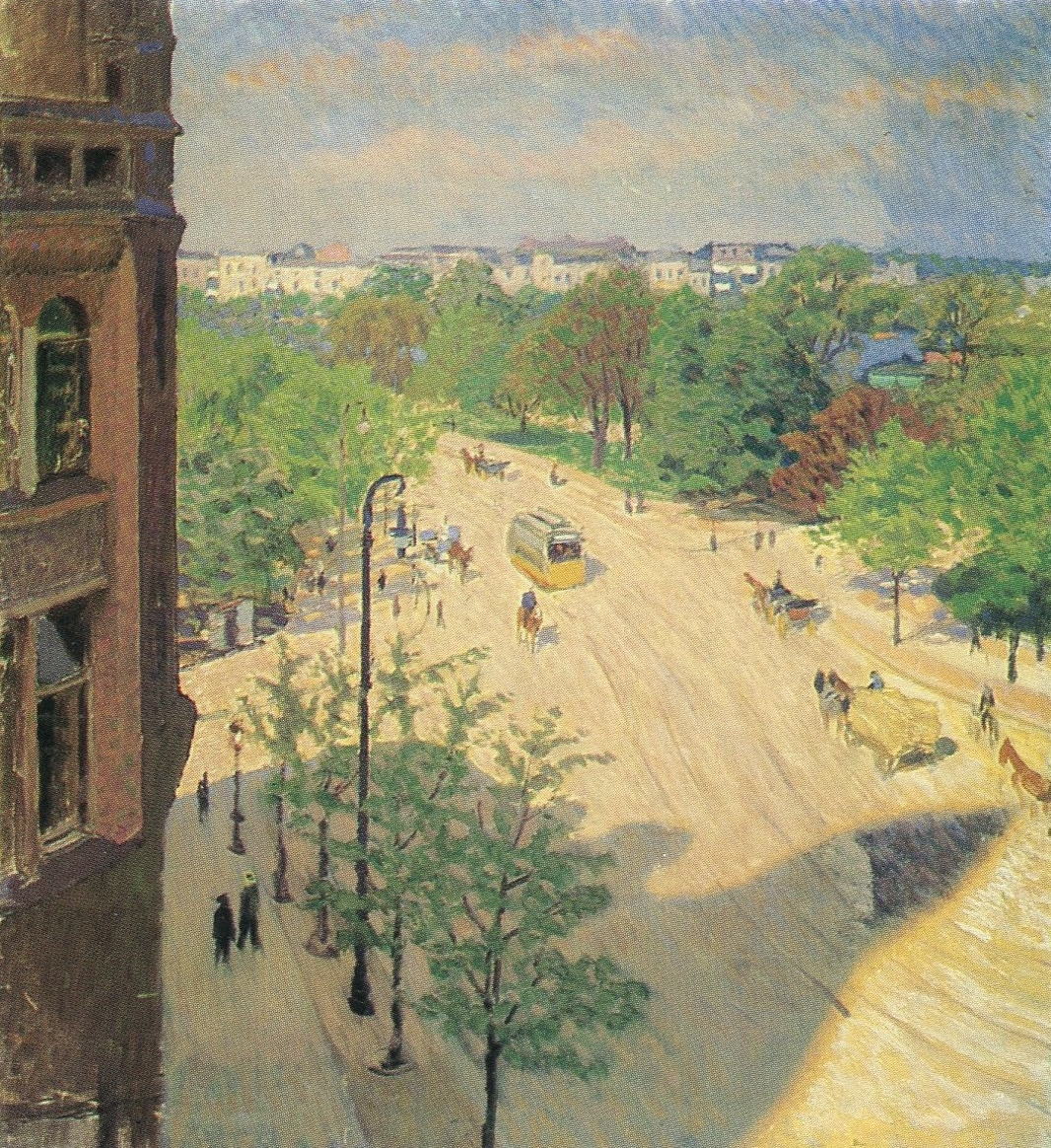
View from Gerda Koppel's Art School

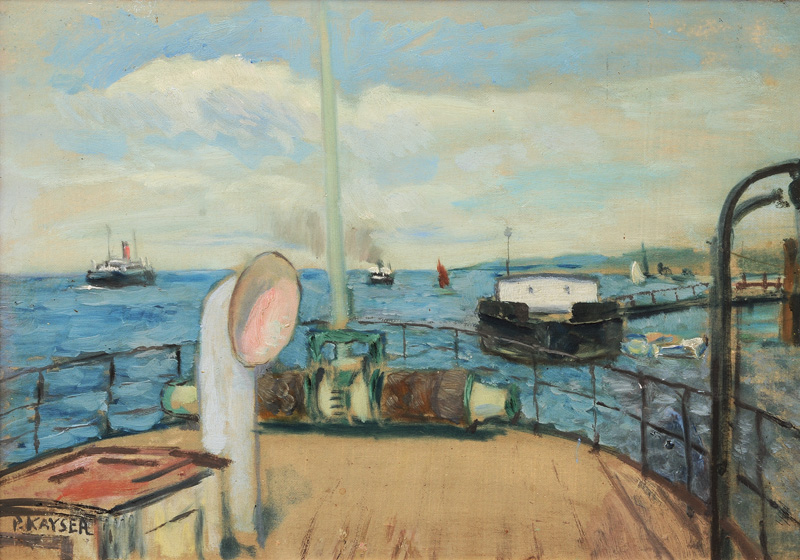
On the Elbe

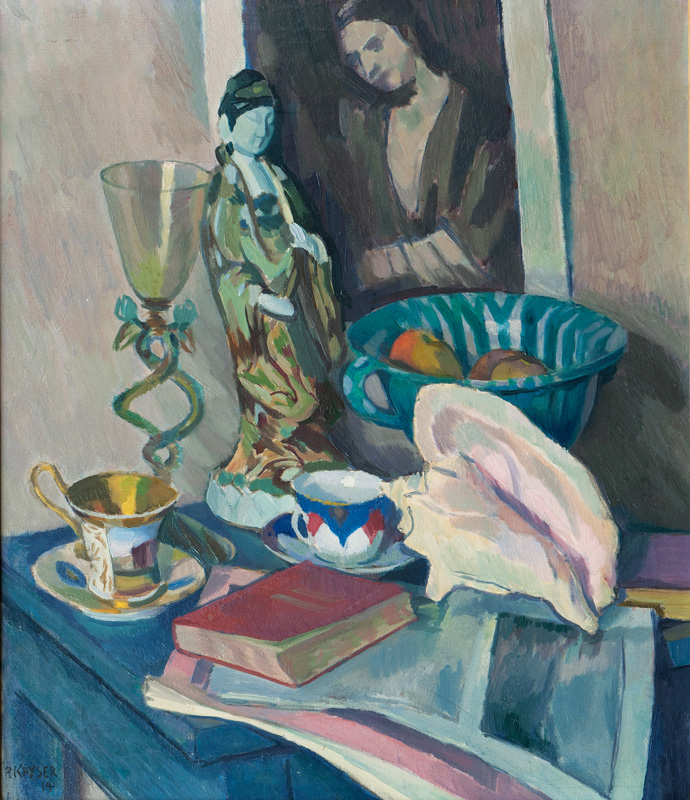
Still-life

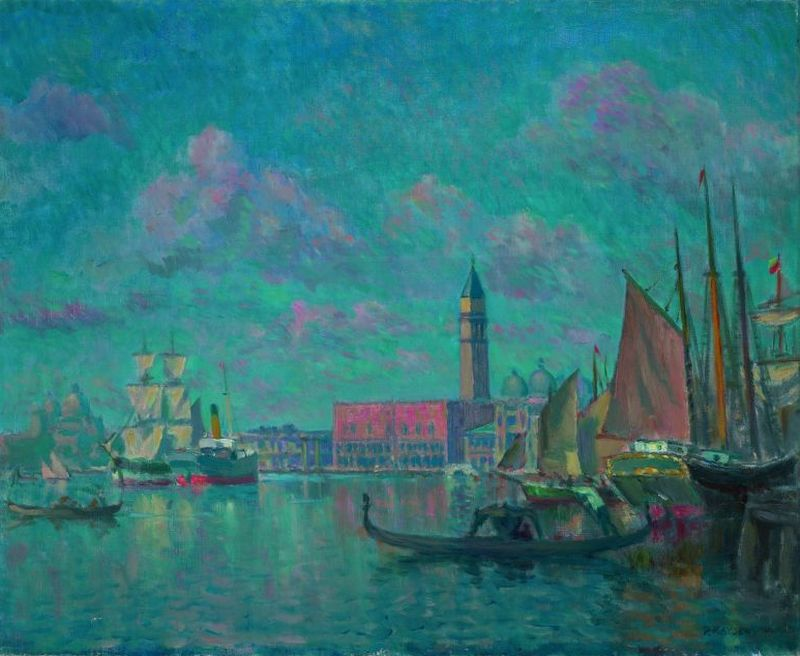
Venice

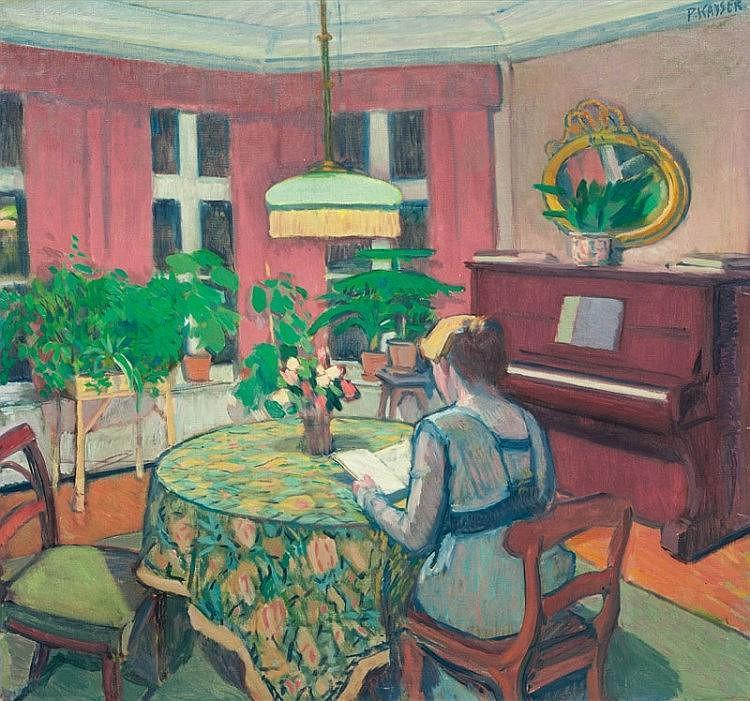
Interior with Melanie

== Sources ==
- Carsten Meyer-Tönnesmann (2004), Paul Kayser (1869–1942) – Bilder aus Hamburg Ausstellung in der Hamburger Sparkasse … 18. Februar – 8. April 2004 (in German), Hamburg, OCLC 249453460
- Hamburger Kunsthalle, Hamburger Ansichten. Maler sehen die Stadt. Wienand Verlag, Köln 2009, ISBN 978-3-86832-018-3, pg.190.
- Anna Lena Meyer: Paul Kayser, Maler. In: Olaf Matthes and Ortwin Pelc: Menschen in der Revolution. Hamburger Porträts 1918/19. Husum Verlag, Husum 2018, ISBN 978-3-89876-947-1, pgs.92–94.
- Kayser, Paul. In: Ernst Rump (Ed.): Lexikon der bildenden Künstler Hamburgs, Altonas und der näheren Umgebung. Bröcker, Hamburg 1912
- Kayser, Paul. In: Hans Vollmer (Ed.): Allgemeines Lexikon der Bildenden Künstler von der Antike bis zur Gegenwart, Vol. 20: Kaufmann–Knilling. E. A. Seemann, Leipzig 1927, pg.46
