= Carl August Heinrich Ferdinand Oesterley =

German painter

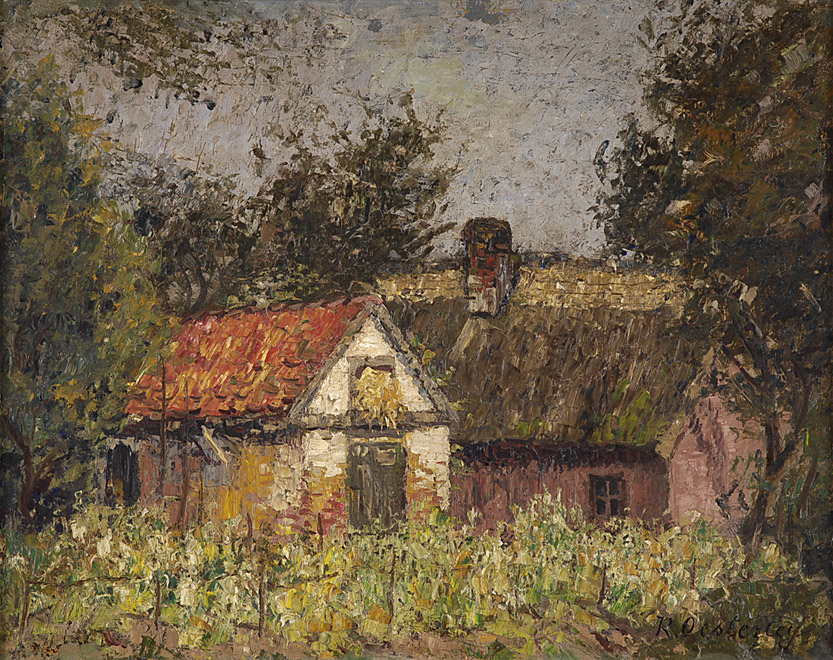
Farm, private collection

Carl August Heinrich Ferdinand Oesterley (January 23, 1839 – December 16, 1930) was a German landscape painter who eventually specialized in scenes from Norway.

== Biography ==
He was a native of Göttingen, the son of painter Carl Friedrich Wilhelm Oesterley. He attended classes at the Polytechnikum in Hannover, where he studied under his father. Beginning 1857, he attended the Kunstakademie (Art Academy) in Düsseldorf, where he studied painting under Ernst Deger and Eduard Bendemann.

During a visit to Lübeck in 1865, where he copied Hans Memling's Passion, he made some attempts at architectural and landscape painting. These turned out so well that from then on he dedicated himself to landscape painting. Beginning in 1870 he focused his artistic efforts mainly on Norwegian landscapes, for which he devoted several study trips. Together with his friend Carl Rodeck, he also visited the Netherlands, Belgium and England. He lived in Hamburg and received a first-class medal from the Münchener Ausstellung (Munich Exhibition). He died in Altona-Blankenese, now Hamburg.

== Selected paintings ==
His best works, characterized by their grand conception and skillful use of color and light, are:

- Mitternachtstimmung bei den Lofoten (Midnight mood in the Lofoten)
- Norwegische Gebirgsschlucht (Mountain gorge in Norway)
- Romsdalsfjord, norwegischer Fjord (Romsdalshorn Fjord, Norway, 1891, Leipzig Museum)
- Raftsund im nördlichen Norwegen (Raft Sound in northern Norway, 1879, Breslau Museum)
- Fischer an der norwegischen Küste (Fishing on the Norwegian coast)
- Nordische Sommernacht (Nordic summer night)
- Oldenvand im Nordfjord (Oldenvand in Nordfjord, 1885, National Gallery, Berlin)
- Am Saltenfjord (View on Salten Fiord, 1882, Hamburg Gallery)
