= Arthur Illies =

German painter (1870–1952)

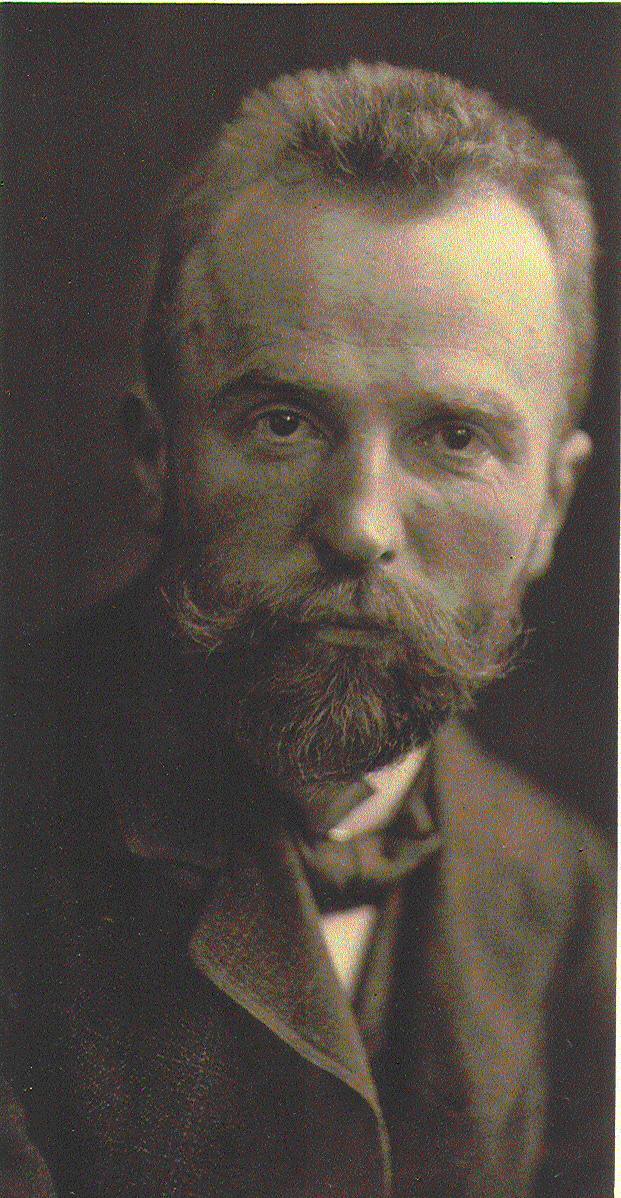
Arthur Illies (1905) Photograph by Rudolf Dührkoop

Karl Wilhelm Arthur Illies (9 February 1870 – 27 May 1952) was a German painter and graphic artist.

== Life and work ==
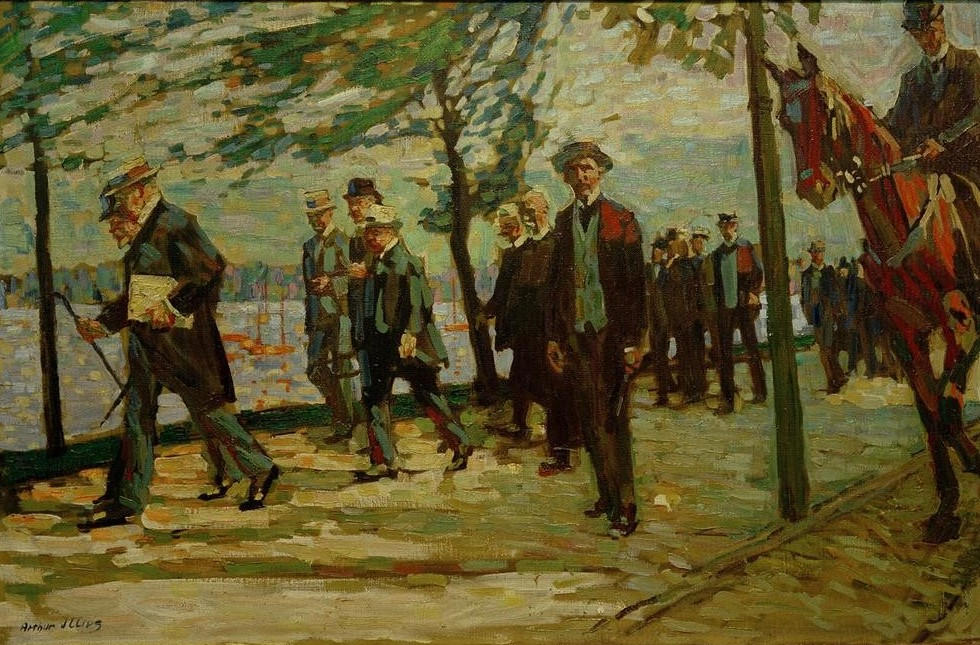
Going to the Office (1908)

He was born in Hamburg to Theodor Friedrich Wilhelm Illies, a merchant, and his wife, Albertine Mathilde née Schwarze. He attended the Johanneum then, at sixteen, began an apprenticeship as a decorative painter at the firm of Wirth & Bay. In the evenings he studied nude drawing with Paul Düyffcke and, on Sundays, he studied animal drawing at the zoo with Heinrich Ehrich. In 1889, after passing his journeyman examination, he went to Munich for studies at the Königlichen Kunstgewerbeschule, where his primary instructor was Ludwig Lesker (1840-1890). The following year, he enrolled at the Munich Academy of Fine Arts. There, he studied with Johann Caspar Herterich. Dissatisfied, he left in 1892, without completing his studies, and returned to Hamburg.

In 1894, he joined the Hamburger Künstlerverein and practiced Open-air painting with a group of his fellow artists. During this time, he produced over 60 landscapes. The following year, he began teaching at the "Painting School for Ladies" operated by Valesca Röver, and would work there until 1908. He was a co-founder of the Hamburgischer Künstlerklub in 1897, and became engaged to Minna Schwerdtfeger (1877–1901), one of his students. Two years later, he was sufficiently successful to have his own house built.

He married Minna in 1900. A year later, she died during childbirth. Overwhelmed with grief, he took his new daughter Helga and went to live with his mother. It was some time before he returned to painting. He remarried in 1905, to another one of his students, Georgie Rabeler (1880–1960). They would eventually have five children together. His son Harald (1911–1985) also became a painter.

In 1908, he became a lecturer at the Staatliche Kunstgewerbeschule (now the University of Fine Arts), for a newly established nude drawing course. During World War I he was exempted from compulsory military service, but went to the front for three months in 1916, on behalf of Otto Lauffer, Director of the Museum for Hamburg History, to make sketches that were exhibited in 1918. After the war, he focused on religious painting. During the following years, Anti-Semitic sentiments began to appear in his personal letters. He became a member of the Militant League for German Culture in 1928, and joined the Nazi Party in 1933. As a result, he was dismissed from his teaching position and moved his family to Lüneburg.

Although he apparently received no special support from the Third Reich, his paintings were displayed at the Große Deutsche Kunstausstellungen from 1941 to 1944, and Joseph Goebbels bought one of his works in 1943. That same year, many of his paintings were destroyed by Allied bombing raids. In 1945, he lost his home and moved into a hotel. Increasing vision problems forced him to paint still-lifes.

In 1951, during an exhibition at the Museum of Ethnology, he was named an honorary member of the "Hamburg Artists' Association". He died in his studio in Lüneburg and was interred at the Ohlsdorf Cemetery. In 1955, a street was named after him in the Steilshoop district of Hamburg.

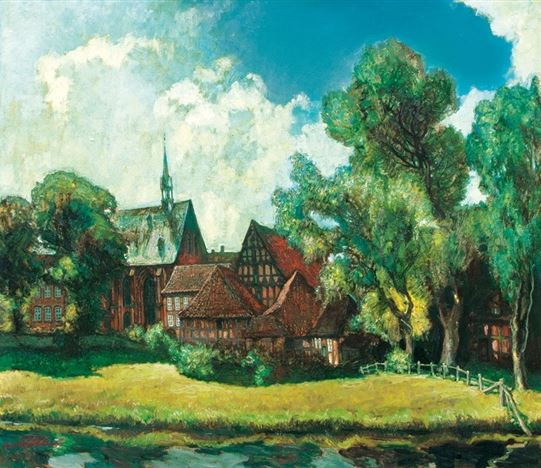
The Lüne Monastery (1943)
