= Özer =

Özer is made up of the Turkish öz meaning "core, essence" and er meaning "private, soldier". Ozer (Hebrew: עוֹזֵר) is also a personal name or surname in Jewish culture. Özer may refer to:

== Given name ==
- Özer Ateşçi (born 1942), Turkish alpine skier
- Ozer ben Meir (died 1710), Polish rabbi
- Chaim Ozer Grodzinski (1863–1940), Av beis din, posek, Talmudic scholar in Vilnius, Lithuania
- Özer Hurmacı (born 1986), Turkish-German football player
- Ozer Schild (1930–2006), Danish-born Israeli academic, President of the University of Haifa and President of the College of Judea and Samaria ("Ariel College").
- Özer Umdu (born 1952), Turkish retired professional football player

== Surname ==
- Aykut Özer (born 1993), Turkish footballer
- Bilal Aziz Özer (born 1985), Turkish footballer
- Cem Özer (born 1959), Turkish actor
- Cenk Enes Özer (born 1978), Turkish author
- Cevher Özer (born 1983), Turkish professional basketball player
- Deniz Özer (born 1987), Turkish-German footballer
- Dodrupchen Jigme Trinle Ozer (1745–1821), Nyingma tertön who was the "heart-son" of Jigme Lingpa
- Faruk Fatih Özer (1993 or 1994–2025), Turkish cryptocurrency trader and criminal
- Hasan Özer (born 1974), Turkish football player and manager
- Hasibe Erkoç, née Özer, Turkish female boxer
- Hüseyin Özer (born 1949), Turkish British executive chef and restaurateur
- Kenan Özer (born 1987), Turkish footballer
- Özalp Özer, American business professor specializing in pricing science and operations research
- Şehmus Özer (1980–2016), Turkish professional footballer
- Tülay Özer (1946–2026), Turkish singer
- Zerrin Özer (born 1957), Turkish pop singer
- Zülküf Özer (born 1988), Turkish footballer
