= Ben-Meir =

Ben-Meir (Hebrew: בן-מאיר) is a Hebrew surname or patronymic, literally "son of Meir"; may be a Hebraization of the surname Meyerson. Notable people with the name include:

== Surname ==
- Aaron ben Meïr
- Alon Ben-Meir
- Dov Ben-Meir
- Shlomo-Yisrael Ben-Meir
- Yehuda Ben-Meir

== Patrtonymic ==
- Aaron ben Meir of Brest
- Isaac ben Meir Halevi of Düren
- Isaac ben Meir better known as Rivam
- Israel ben Meir di Curiel
- Jacob ben Meir better known as Rabbeinu Tam
- Joseph ben Meir Teomim
- Ozer ben Meir
- Samuel ben Meir better known as Rashbam
- Solomon ben Meir
- Yehuda HaKohen ben Meir
