= Oser =

Oser (Hebrew: אֹשֶׁר) is a Hebrew given name and surname, which may refer to:

== People ==
- Bernard L. Oser (1899–1995), American scientist
- Charles Oser (1902–1994), Swiss politician
- Jean Oser (1908–2002), German-American film editor
- Lee Oser (born 1958), American writer
- Leopold Oser (1839–1910), Austrian physician
- Michael Oser Rabin (born 1931), Israeli computer scientist

== Other uses ==
- Bernard L. Oser Award
- Office of Special Education and Rehabilitative Services (OSERS), U.S. Dept of Education
- Tu aurais dû me dire (Oser parler d'amour), French song
- Wisconsin Office of State Employment Relations (OSER)

== See also ==
- Oeser
- Öser (surname)
- Özer
