= Carl Gustav Carus =

German painter (1789–1869)

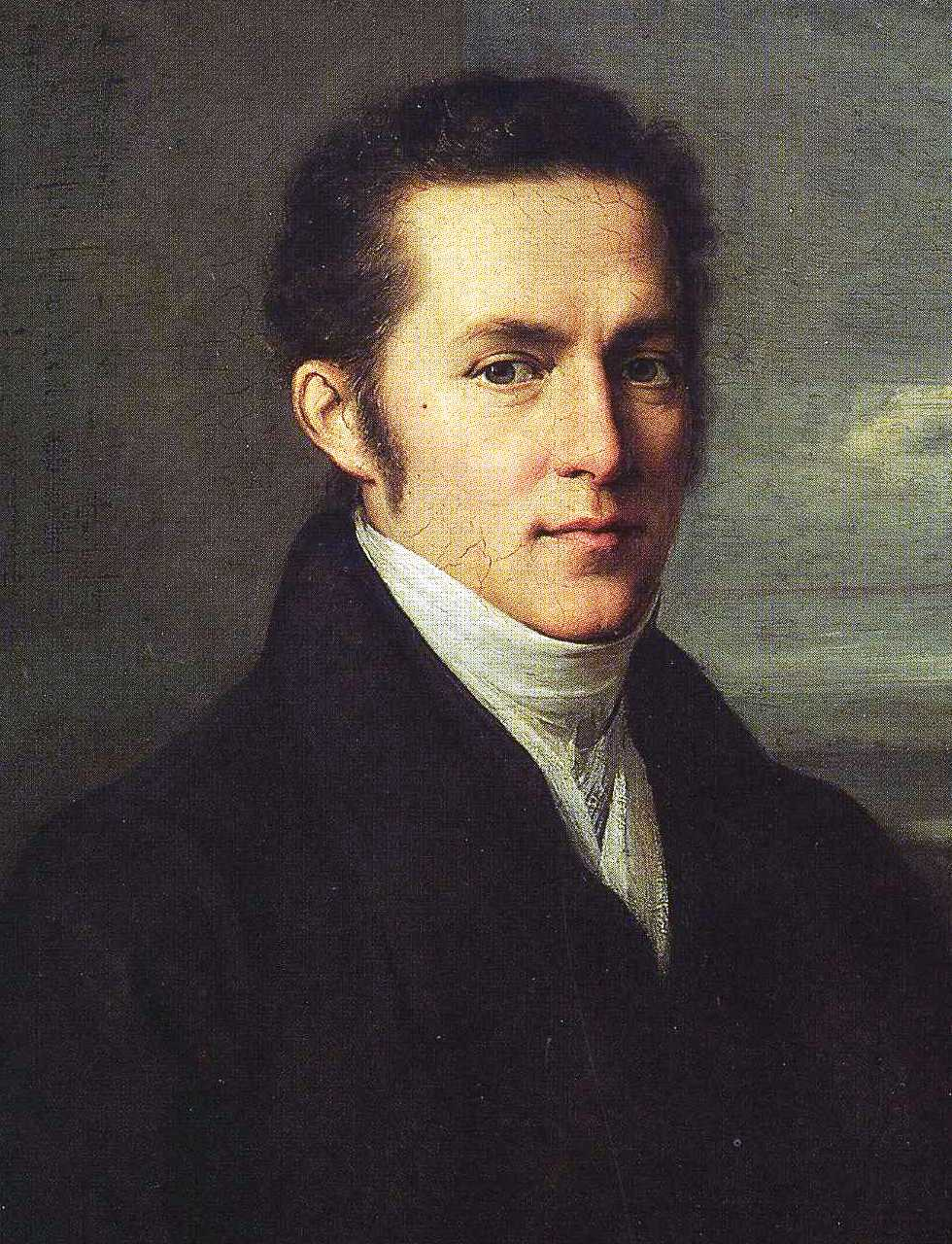
- Portrait by Johann Carl Rößler
- Born: 3 January 1789
- Died: 28 July 1869 (aged 80)
- Known for: Painting

Carl Gustav Carus (3 January 1789 – 28 July 1869) was a German physiologist and painter, born in Leipzig in a house in the street Ranstädter Steinweg, who played various roles during the Romantic era. A friend of the writer Johann Wolfgang Goethe, he was a many-sided man: a doctor, a naturalist, a scientist, a psychologist, and a landscape painter who studied under Caspar David Friedrich.

== Life and work ==
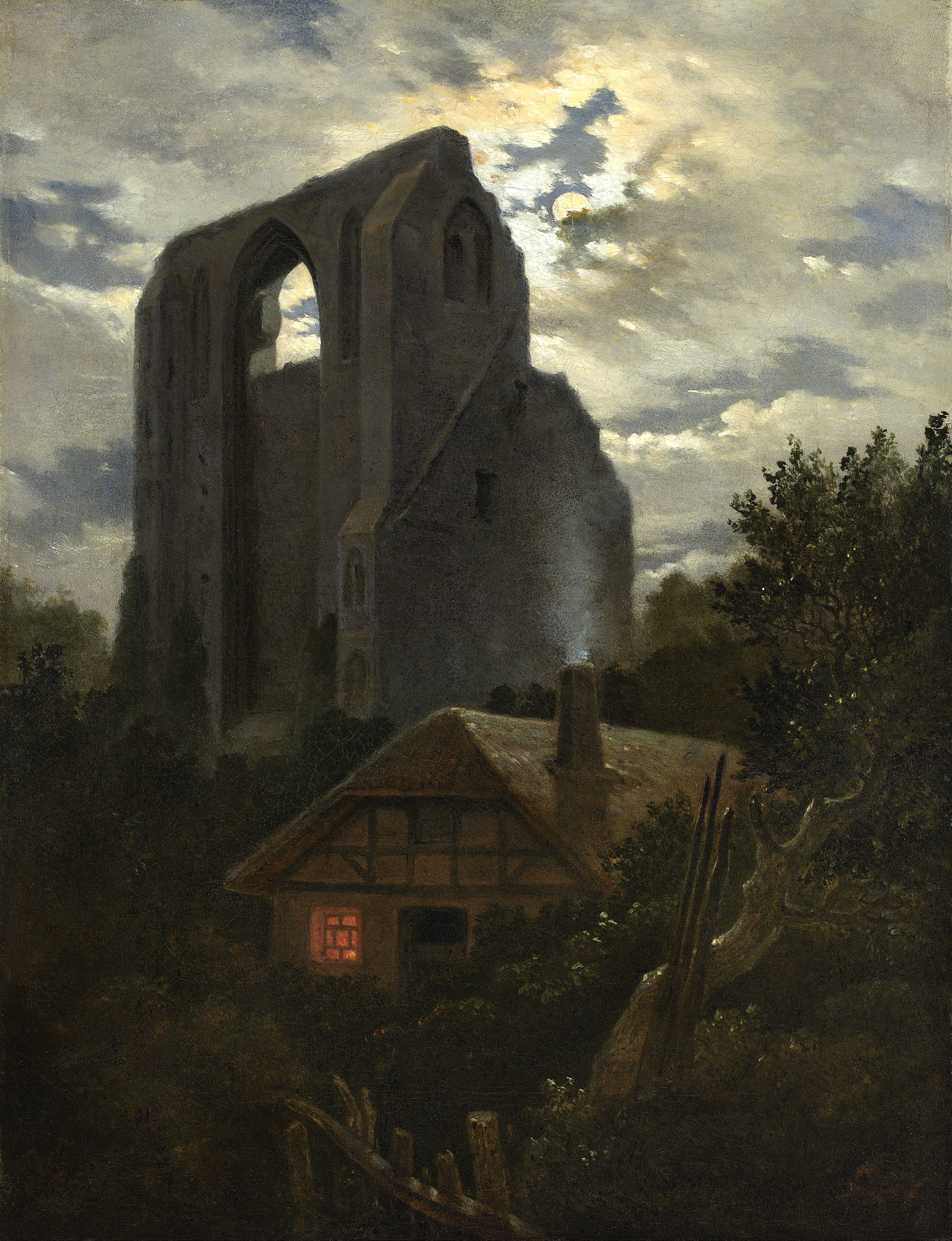
Carl Gustav Carus – Ruine Eldena mit Hütte bei Greifswald im Mondschein

In 1811 he graduated as a doctor of medicine and a doctor of philosophy. In 1814 he was appointed professor of obstetrics and director of the maternity clinic at the teaching institution for medicine and surgery in Dresden. He wrote on art theory. From 1814 to 1817 he taught himself oil painting working under Caspar David Friedrich, a Dresden landscape painter. Subsequently, he studied under Julius Schnorr von Carolsfeld at the Oeser drawing academy.

When the King of Saxony, Frederick Augustus II, made an informal tour of Britain in 1844, Carus accompanied him as his personal physician. It was not a state visit, but the King, with Carus, was the guest of Queen Victoria and Prince Albert at Windsor Castle, and Carus was able to visit many of the sights in London and the university cities of Oxford and Cambridge, and meet others active in the field of scientific discoveries. They toured widely in England, Wales and Scotland, and afterwards Carus published, on the basis of his journal, The King of Saxony's Journey through England and Scotland, 1844.

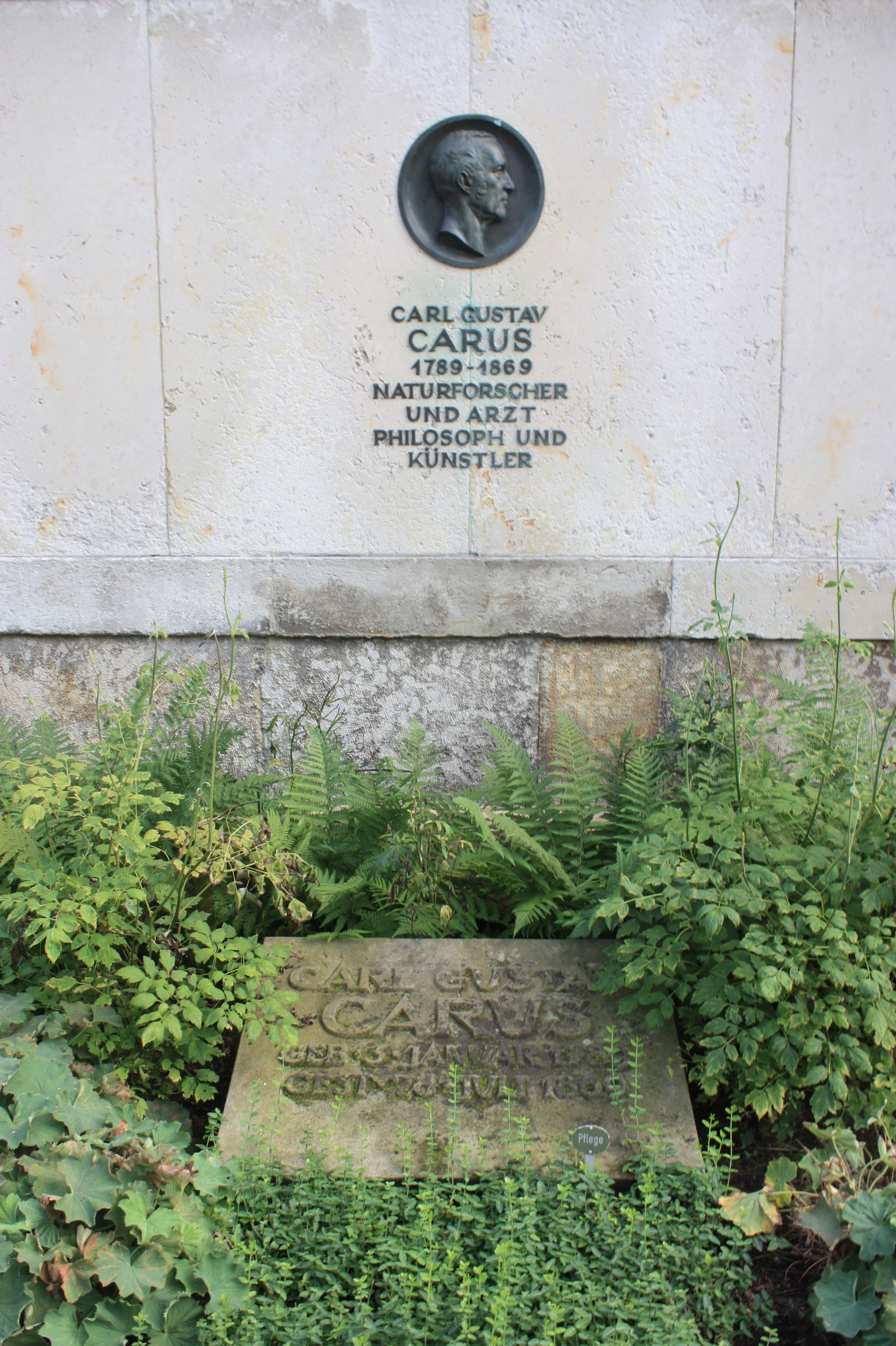
The grave of Carl Gustav Carus, Trinitatisfriedhof, Dresden

He is best known to scientists for originating the concept of the vertebrate archetype, a seminal idea in the development of Darwin's theory of evolution. In 1836, he was elected a foreign member of the Royal Swedish Academy of Sciences. Carus is also noted for Psyche (1846).

He developed a theory of landscape painting whose objective was the visualisation of the inner workings of geological phenomena, which he called "Erdlebenbildkunst" (pictorial art of the life of the earth).

Carl Jung credited Carus with pointing to the unconscious as the essential basis of the psyche.

Although various philosophers, among them Leibniz, Kant, and Schelling, had already pointed very clearly to the problem of the dark side of the psyche, it was a physician who felt impelled, from his scientific and medical experience, to point to the unconscious as the essential basis of the psyche. This was C. G. Carus, the authority whom Eduard von Hartmann followed. (Jung [1959] 1969, par. 259)

Carus died in Dresden. He is buried in the Trinitatis-Friedhof (Trinitatis Cemetery) east of the city centre. The grave lies in the south-west section, against the southern wall.

== Family ==
His daughter Charlotte Carus married the artist Ernst Rietschel.

== Written works ==
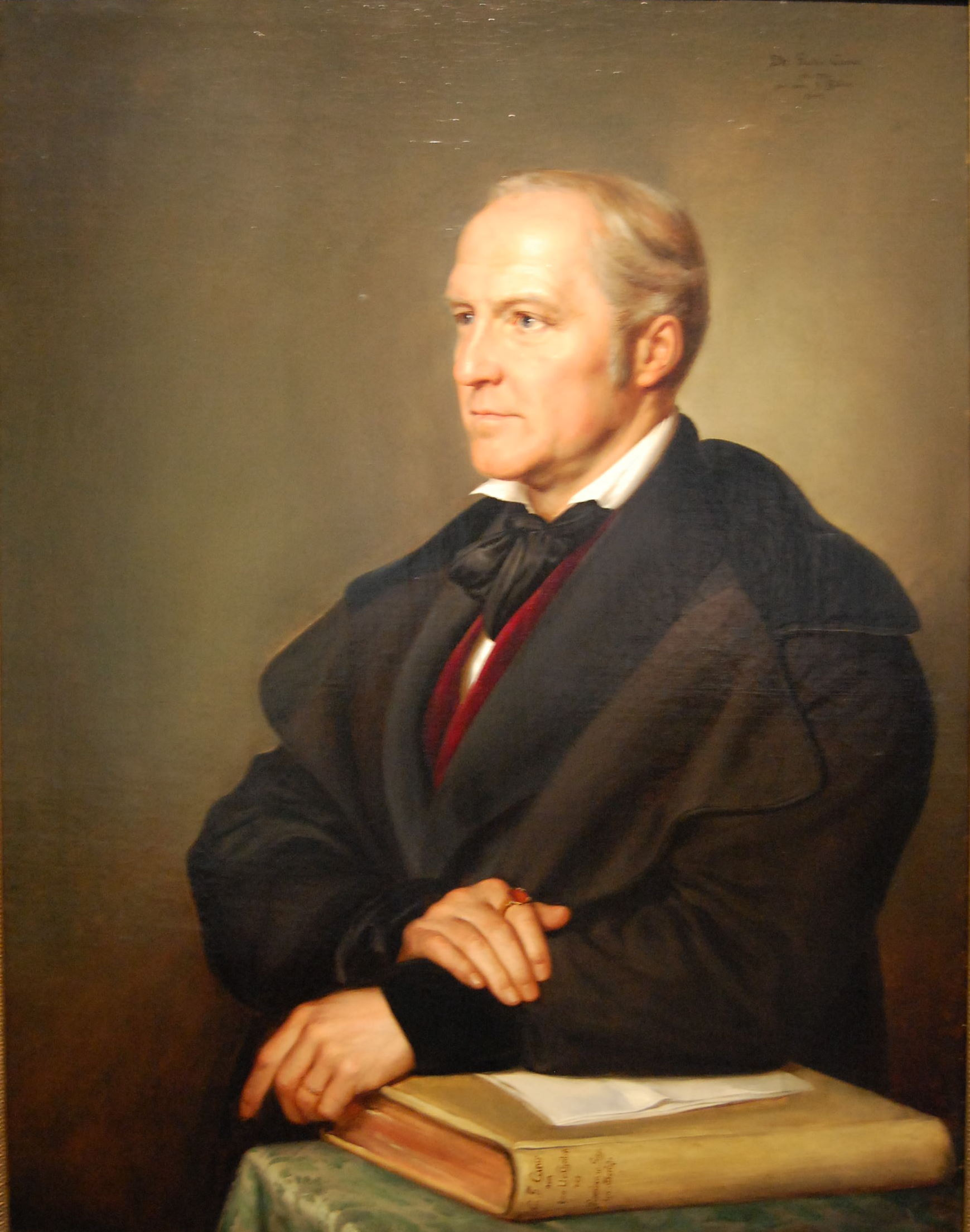
Carl Gustav Carus by Julius Hübner

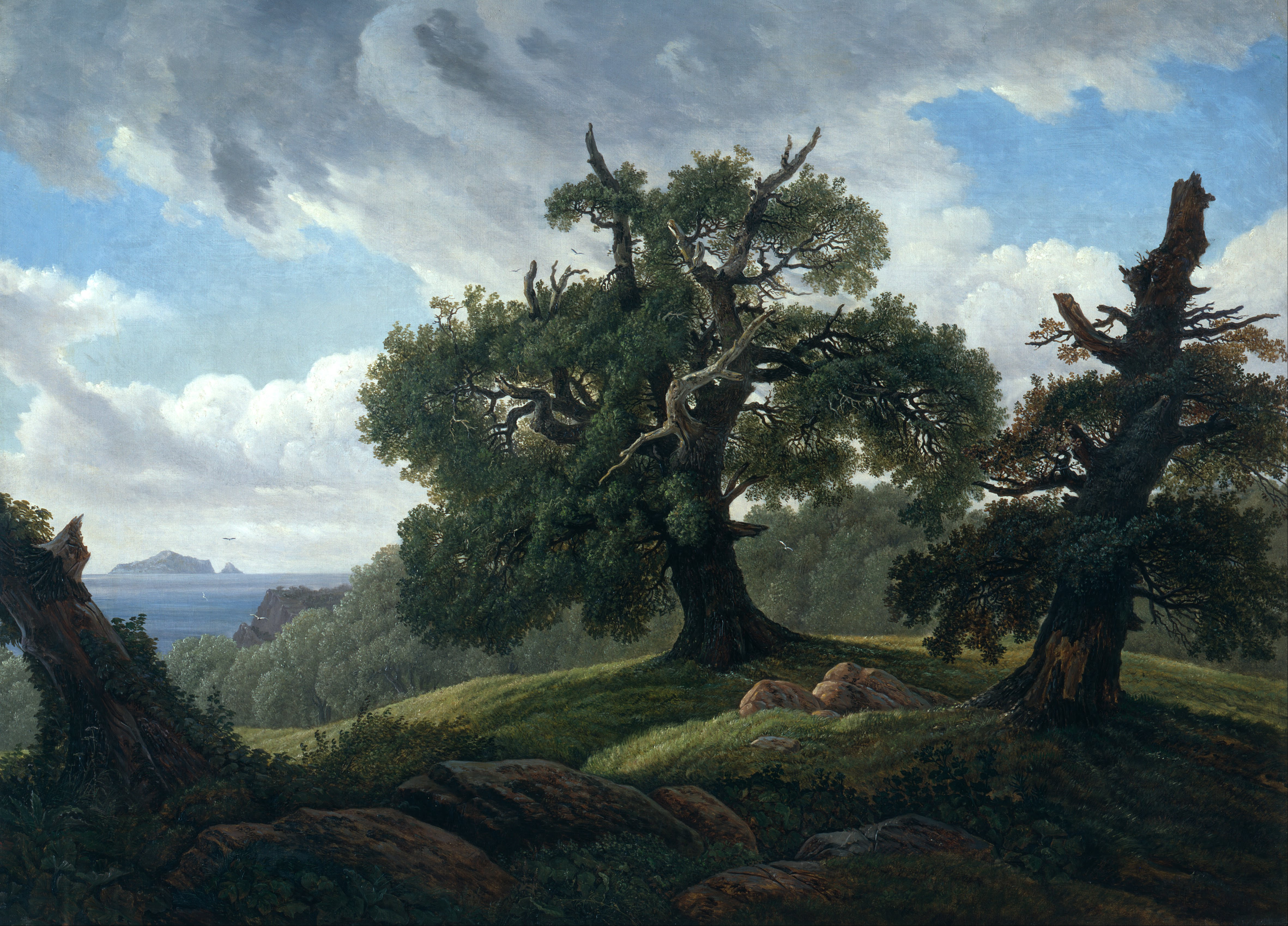
Memory of a Wooded Island in the Baltic Sea (Oak Trees by the Sea)

Zoology, entomology, comparative anatomy, evolution

- Lehrbuch der Zootomie (1818, 1834).
- Erläuterungstafeln zur vergleichenden Anatomie (1826–1855).
- Von den äusseren Lebensbedingungen der weiss- und kaltblütigen Tiere (1824).
- Über den Blutkreislauf der Insekten (1827).
- Grundzüge der vergleichenden Anatomie und Physiologie (1828).
- Lehrbuch der Physiologie für Naturforscher und Aerzte (1838)
- Zwölf Briefe über das Erdleben (1841).
- Natur und Idee oder das Werdende und sein Gesetz. 1861.

Medical

- Lehrbuch der Gynekologie (1820, 1838).
- Grundzüge einer neuen Kranioskopie (1841).
- System der Physiologie (1847–1849).
- Erfahrungsresultate aus ärztlichen Studien und ärztlichen Wirken (1859).
- Neuer Atlas der Kranioskopie (1864).

Psychology, metaphysics, race, physiognomy

- Vorlesungen über Psychologie (1831).
- Psyche; zur Entwicklungsgeschichte der Seele (1846, 1851).
- Über Grund und Bedeutung der verschiedenen Formen der Hand in veschiedenen Personen (About the reason and significance of the various forms of hand in different persons)(1846).
- Über die ungleiche Befähigung der verschiedenen Menschenstämme für höhere geistige Entwicklung (About the unequal aptitude of the different human tribes for higher mental development)(1849).
- Physis. Zur Geschichte des leiblichen Lebens (1851).
- Denkschrift zum 100jährigen Geburtstagsfeste Goethes. Über ungleiche Befähigung der verschiedenen Symbolik der menschlichen Gestalt (1852, 1858).
- Über Lebensmagnetismus und über die magischen Wirkungen überhaupt (1857).
- Über die typisch gewordenen Abbildungen menschlicher Kopfformen (1863).
- Goethe dessen seine Bedeutung für unsere und die kommende Zeit (1863).
- Lebenserinnerungen und Denkwürdigkeiten – 4 volumes (1865–1866).
- Vergleichende Psychologie oder Geschichte der Seele in der Reihenfolge der Tierwelt (1866).

Art

- Neun Briefe über Landschaftsmalerei. Zuvor ein Brief von Goethe als Einleitung (1819–1831).
- Die Lebenskunst nach den Inschriften des Tempels zu Delphi ( 1863).
- Betrachtungen und Gedanken vor auserwählten Bildern der Dresdener Galerie (1867).

Travel

- Sicilien und Neapel (1856).

Translations

- Carus' translation of Dante Alighieri's Divine Comedy, Paradise, Canto I. at academia.edu
- Space, Time, and Man (from Natur und Idee), trans. A. Jacob, Virtus Editions, 2025.

== Art gallery ==
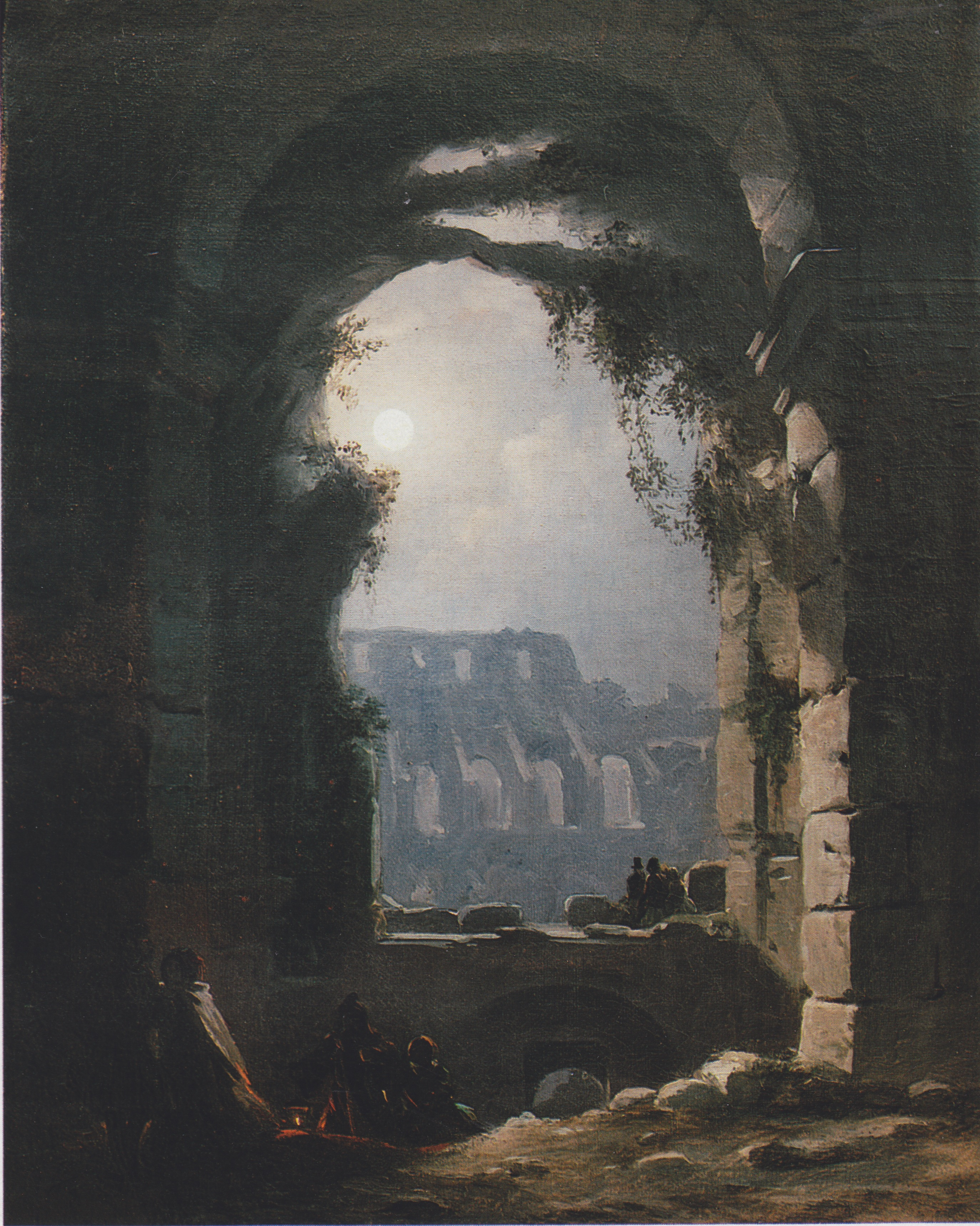
The Colosseum in Moonlight

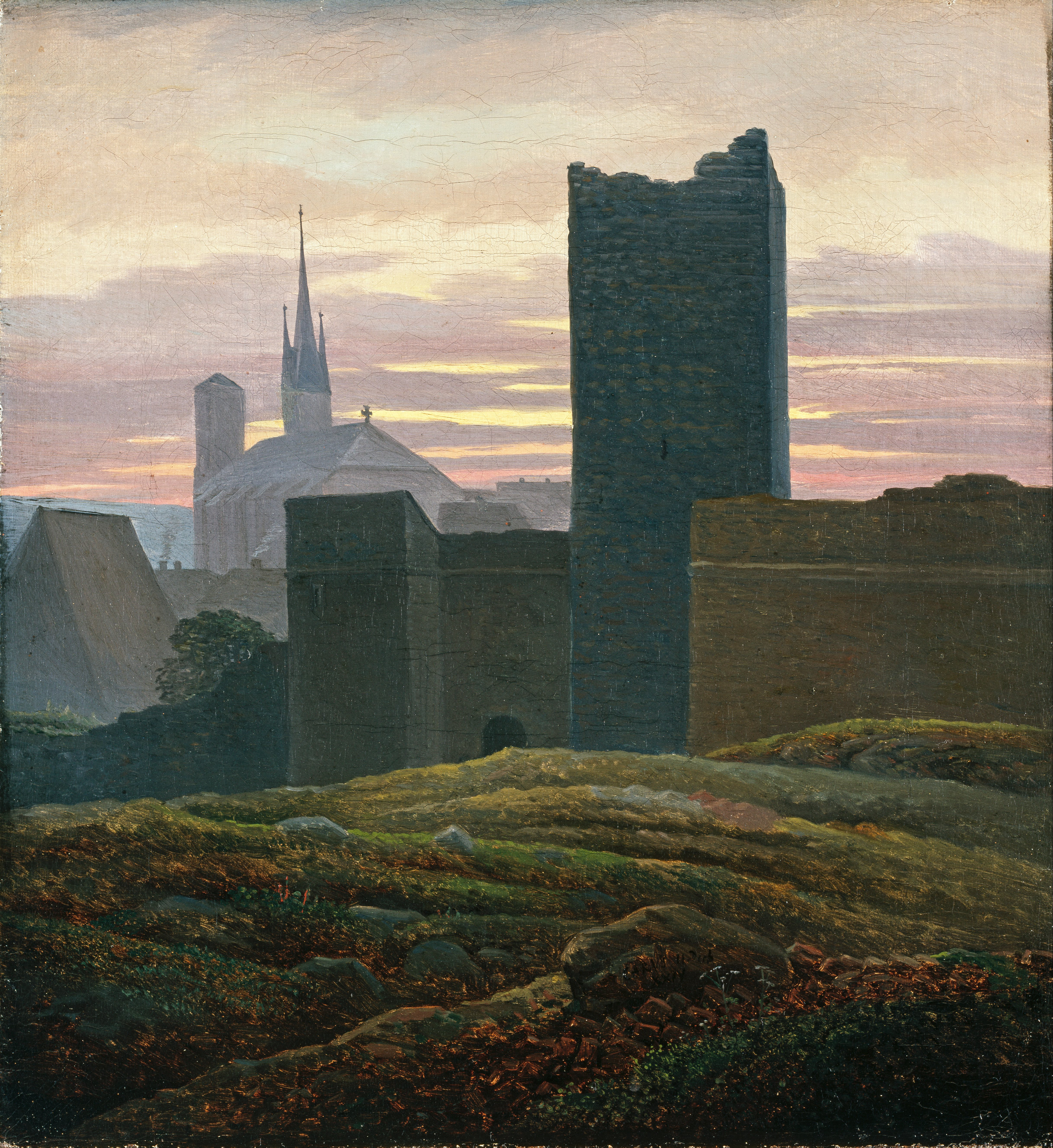
The Imperial Castle

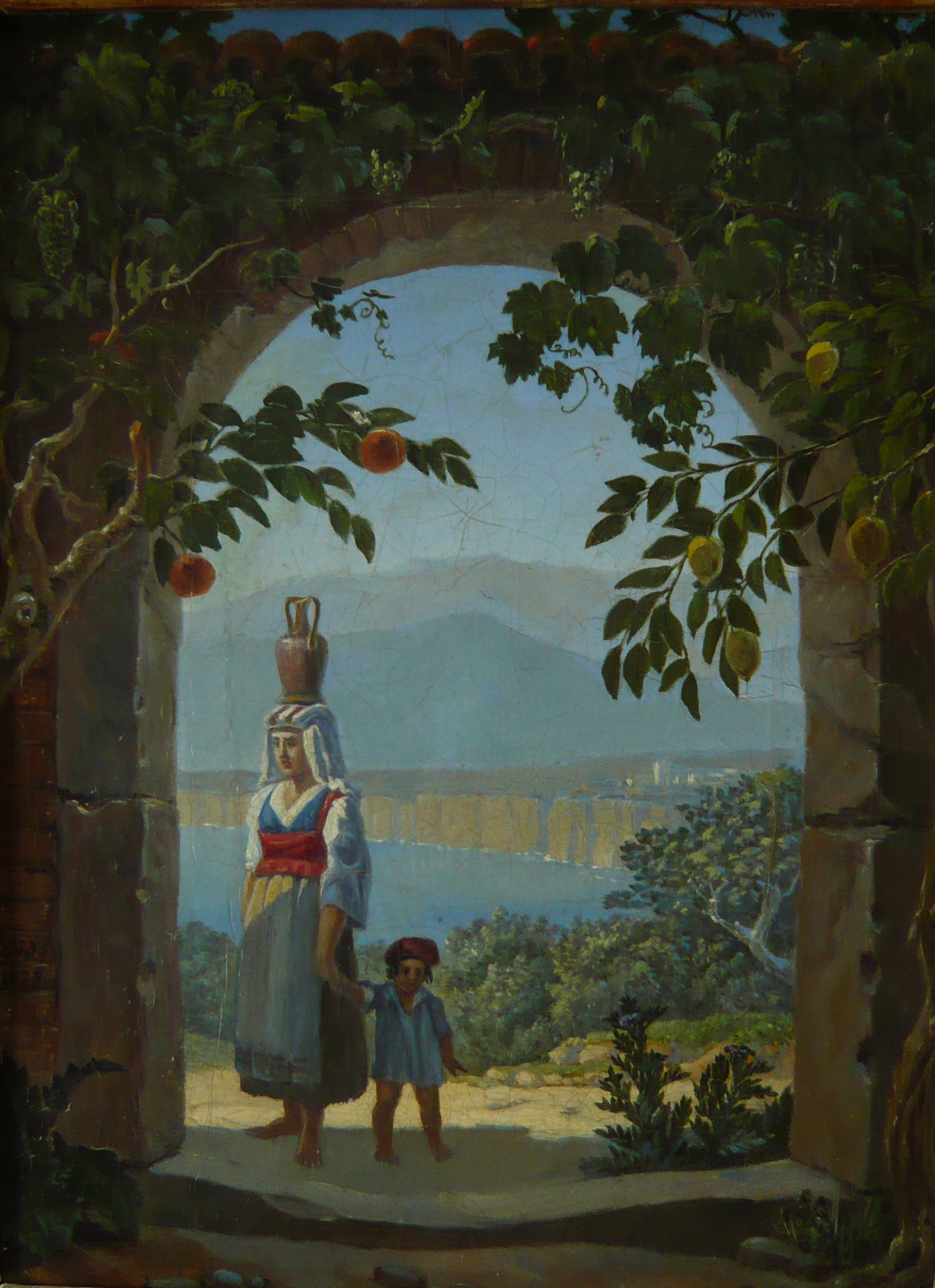
In Memory of Sorrento

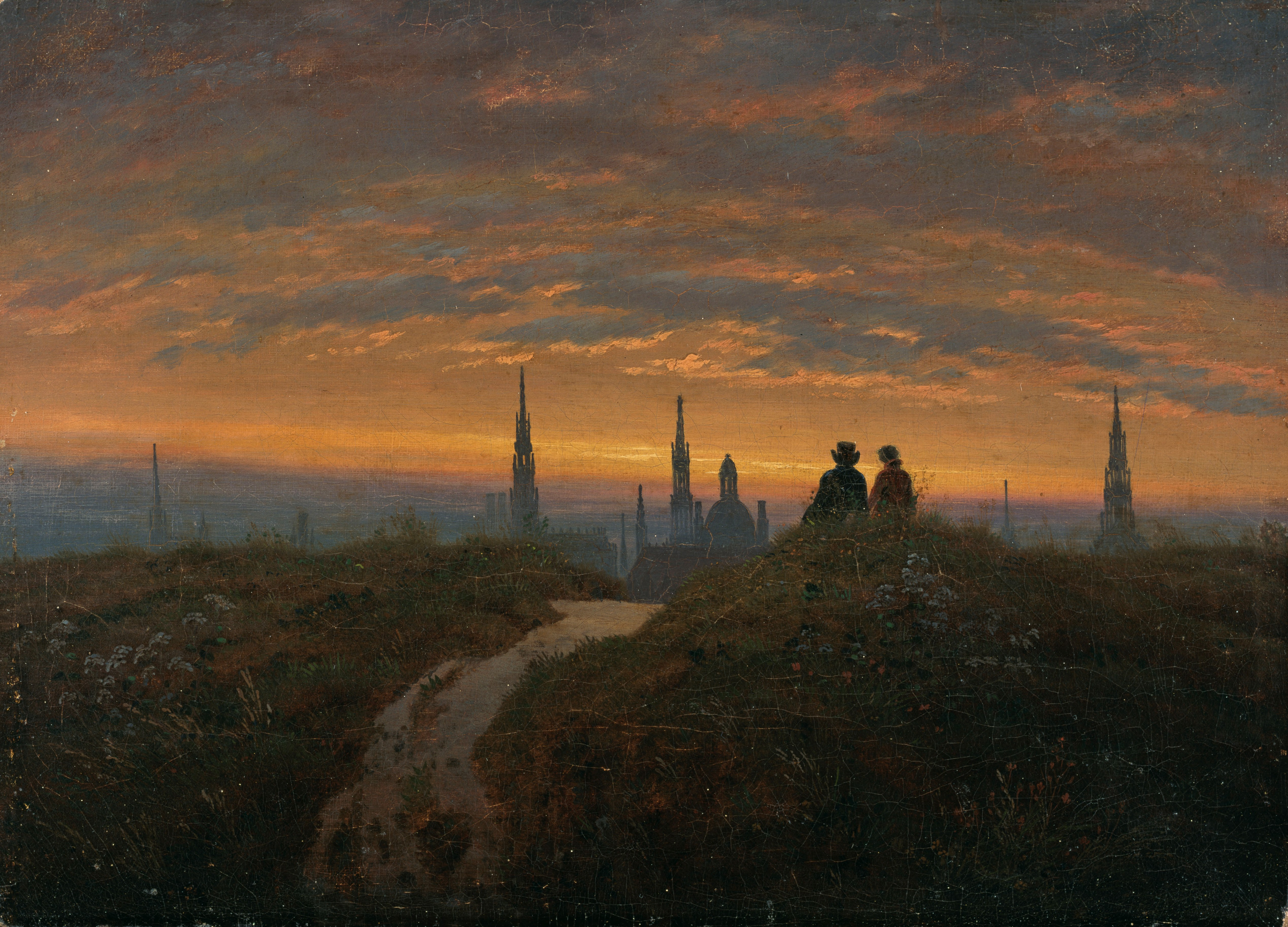
View of Dresden at Sunset

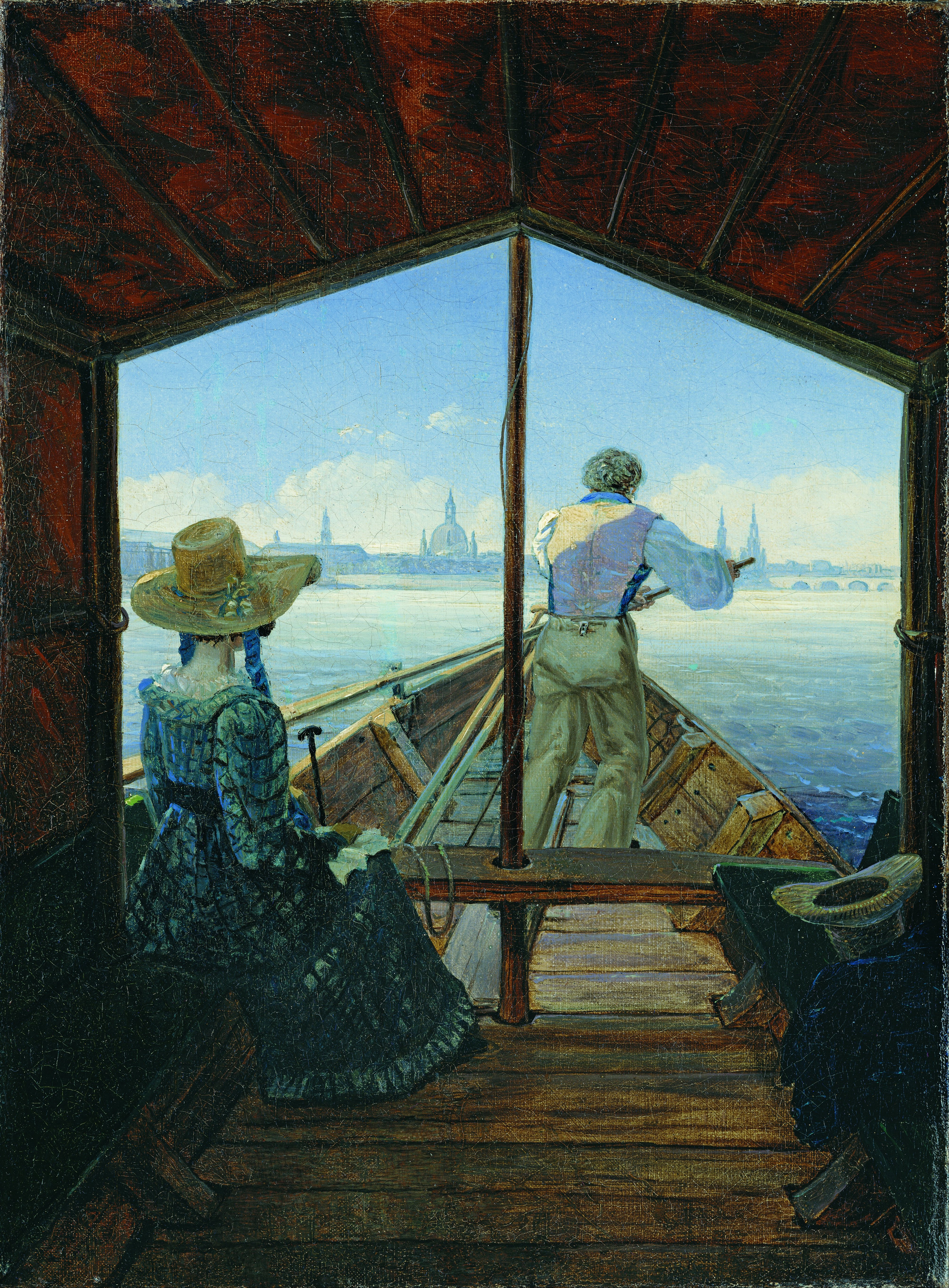
Barge Trip on the Elbe near Dresden

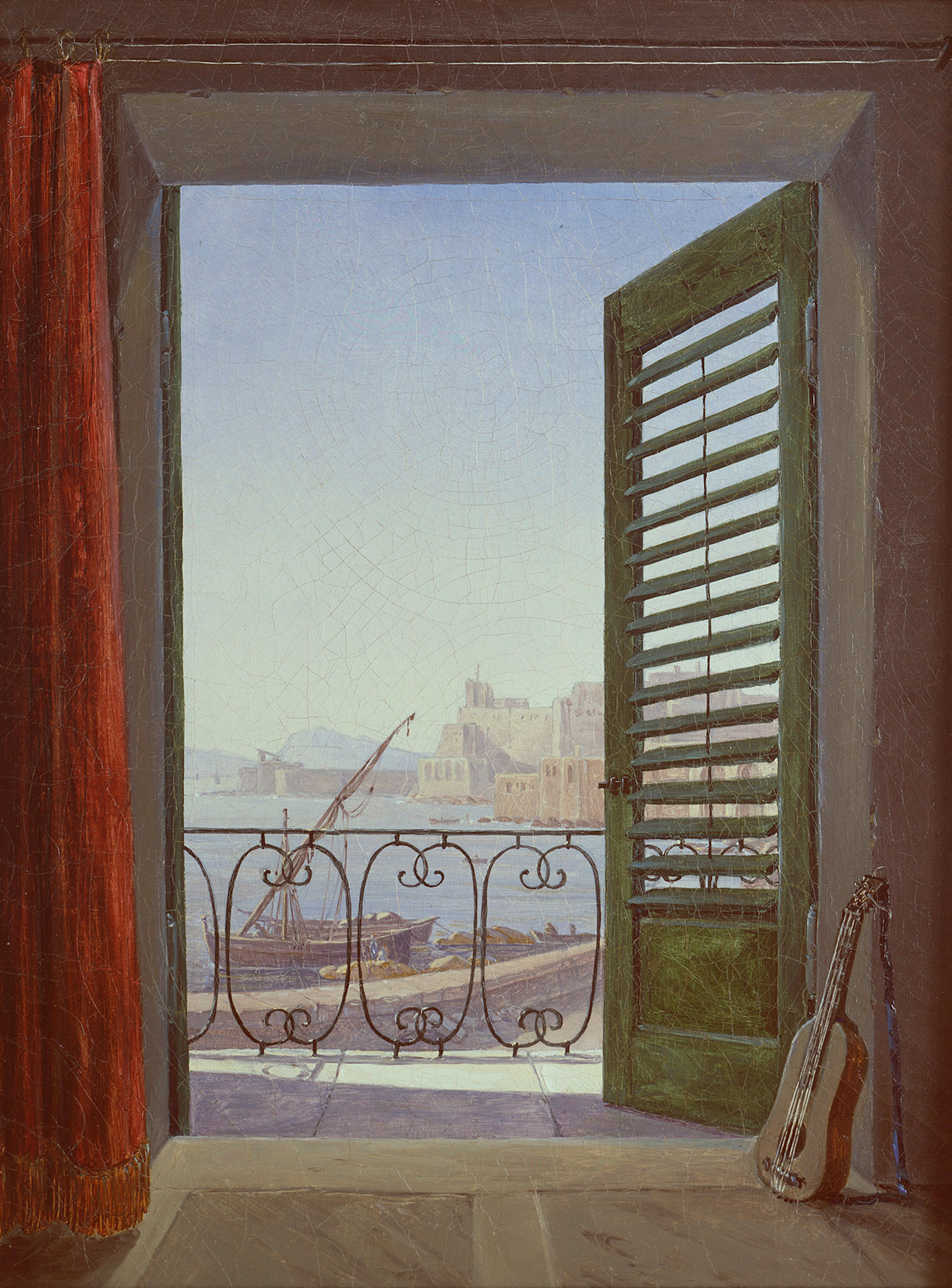
Balcony Room with a View of the Bay of Naples, 1829 or 1830.

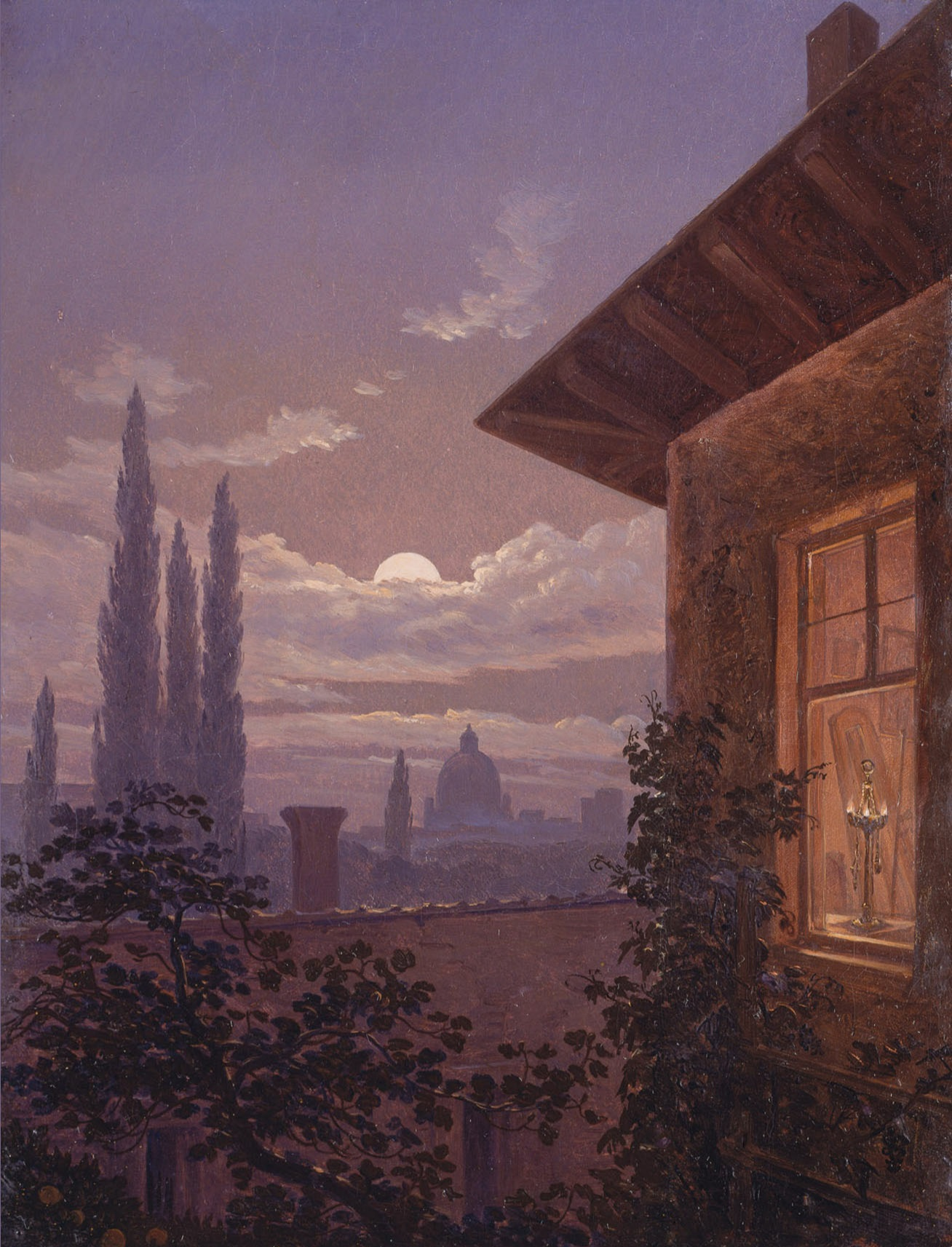
Italian Moonshine (Rome, St. Peter's in Moonshine)

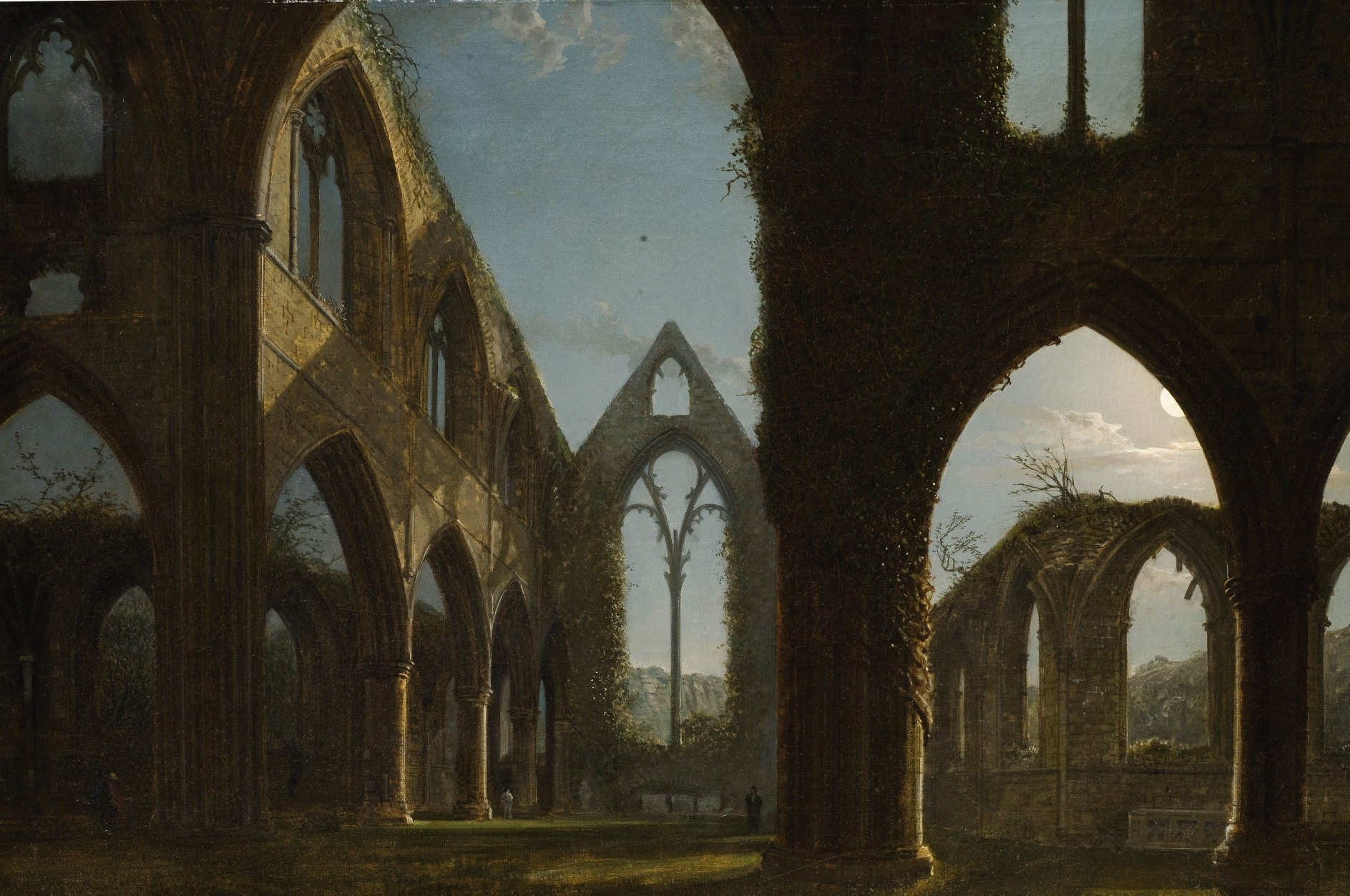
Tintern Abbey

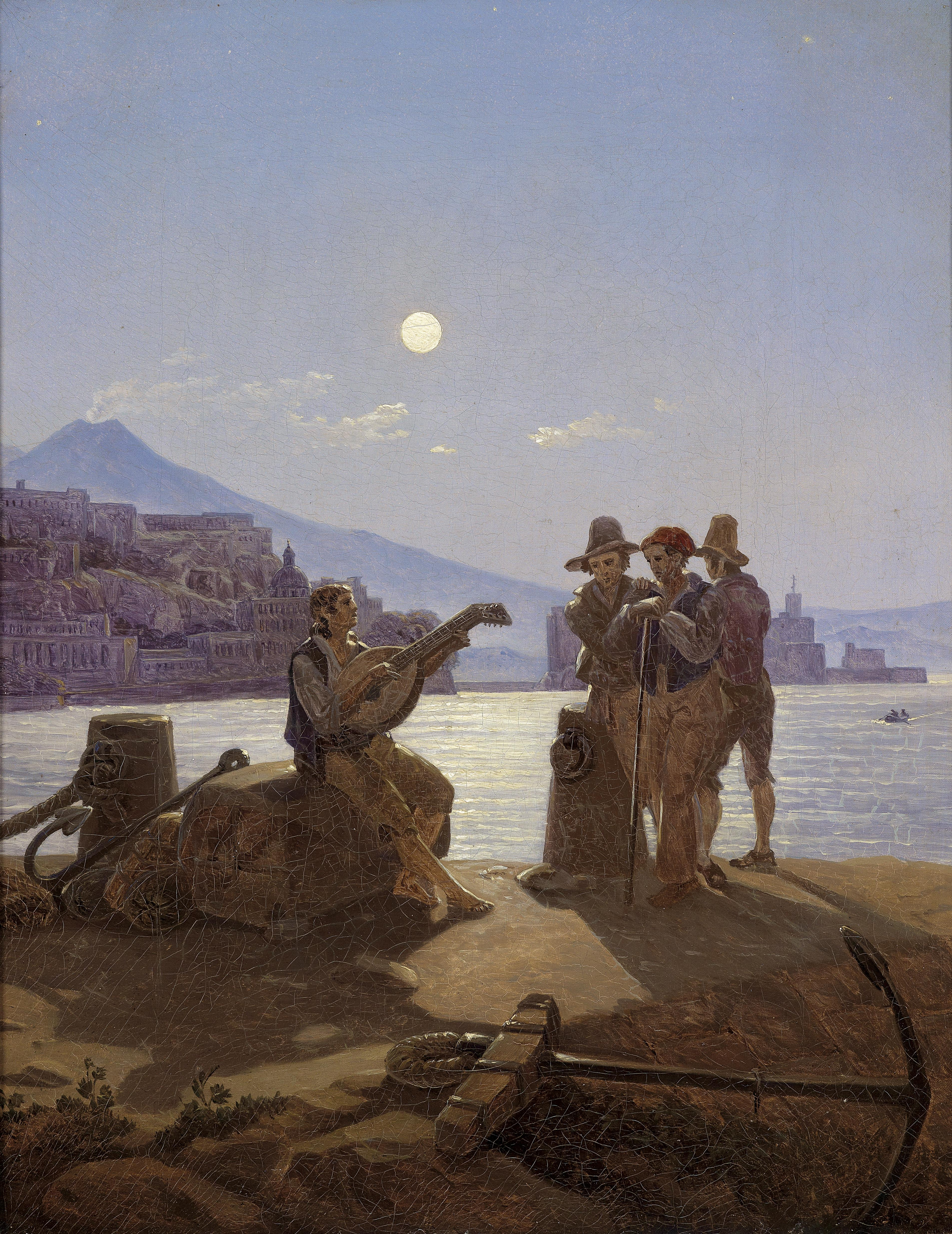
Italian Fishermen in Port

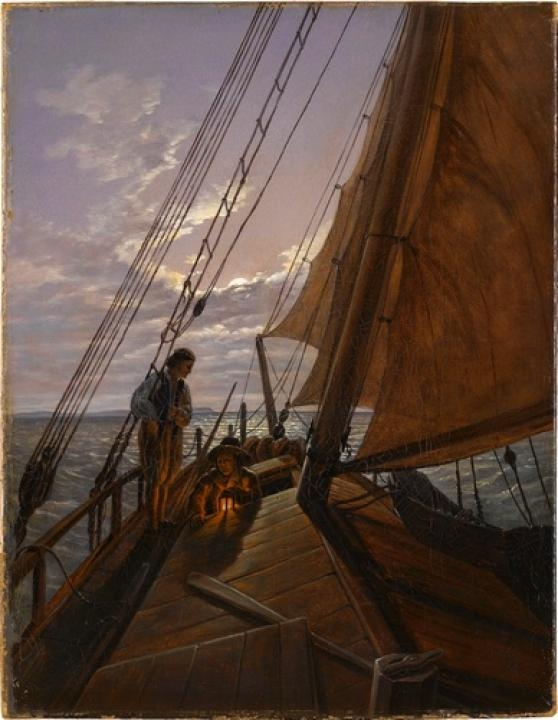
Sailboat

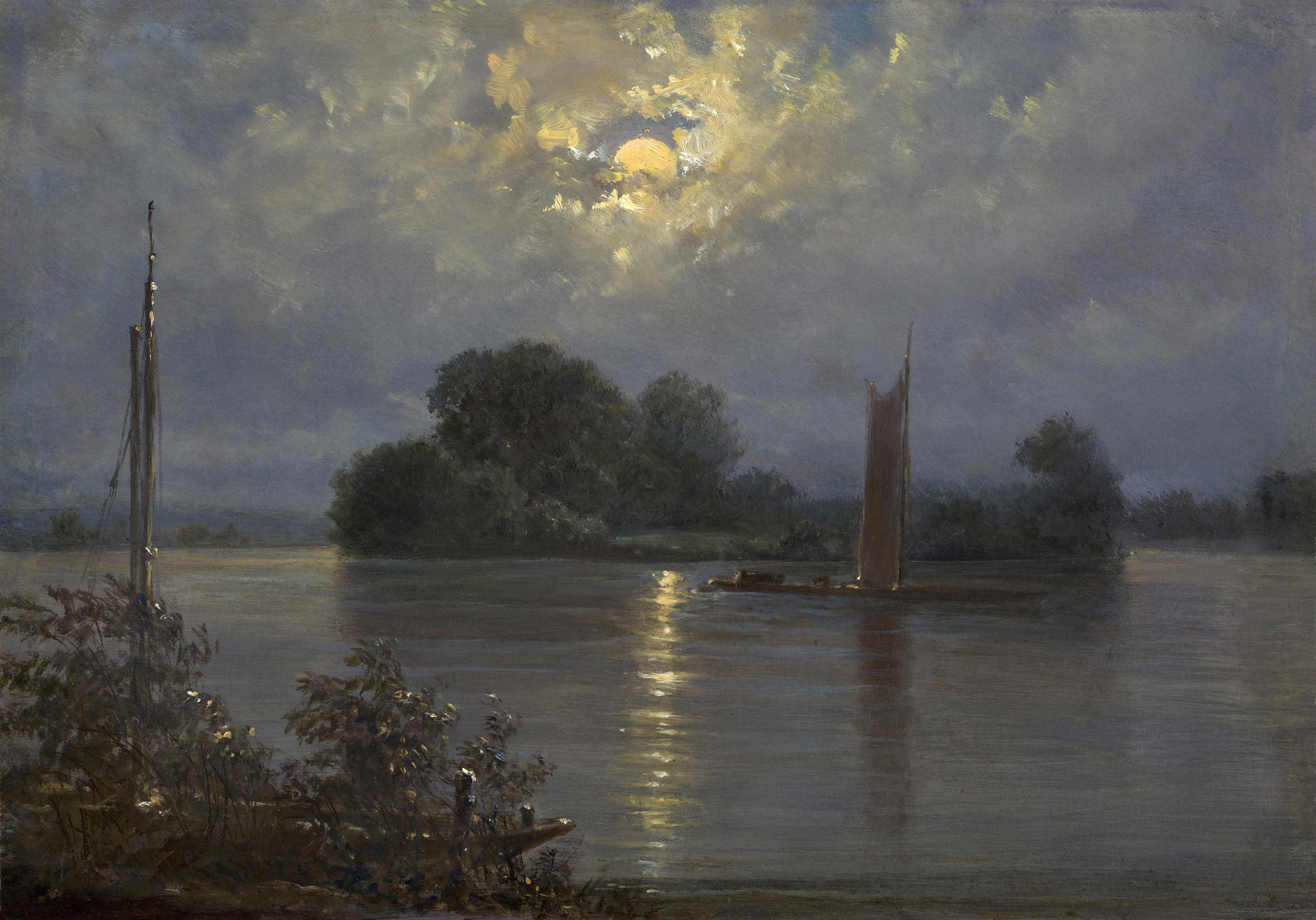
Full Moon near Pillnitz

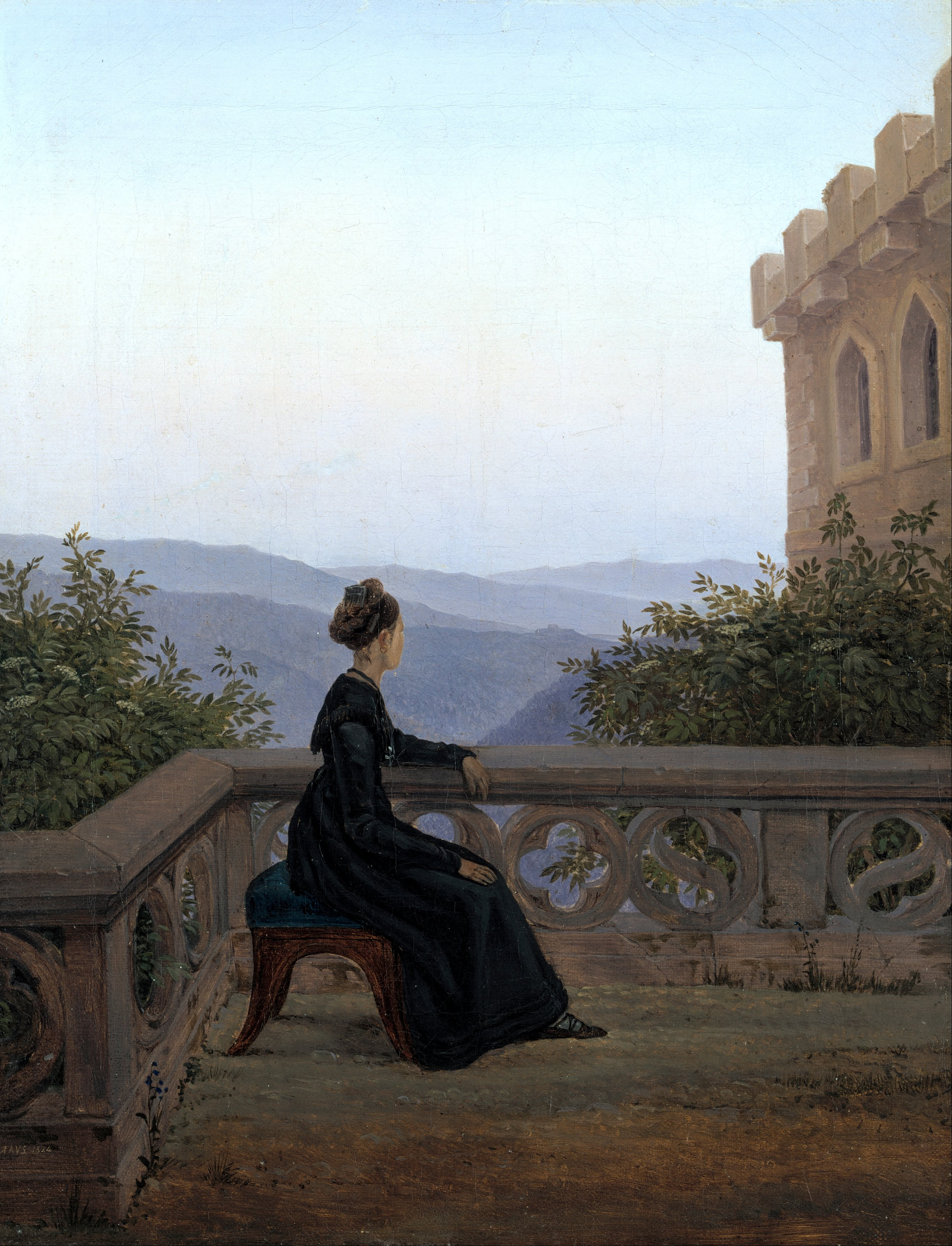
Woman on the Balcony

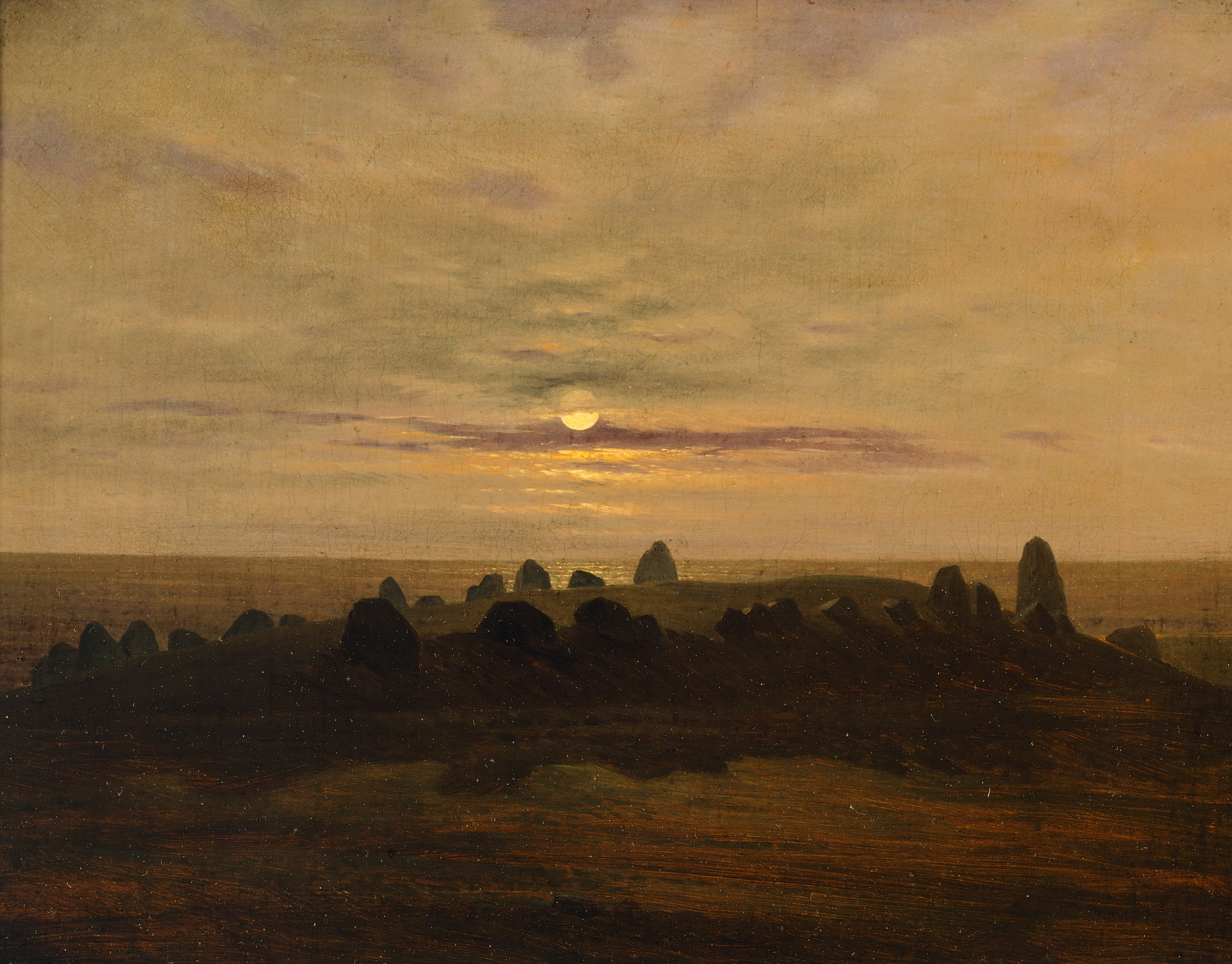
Stone Age Mound

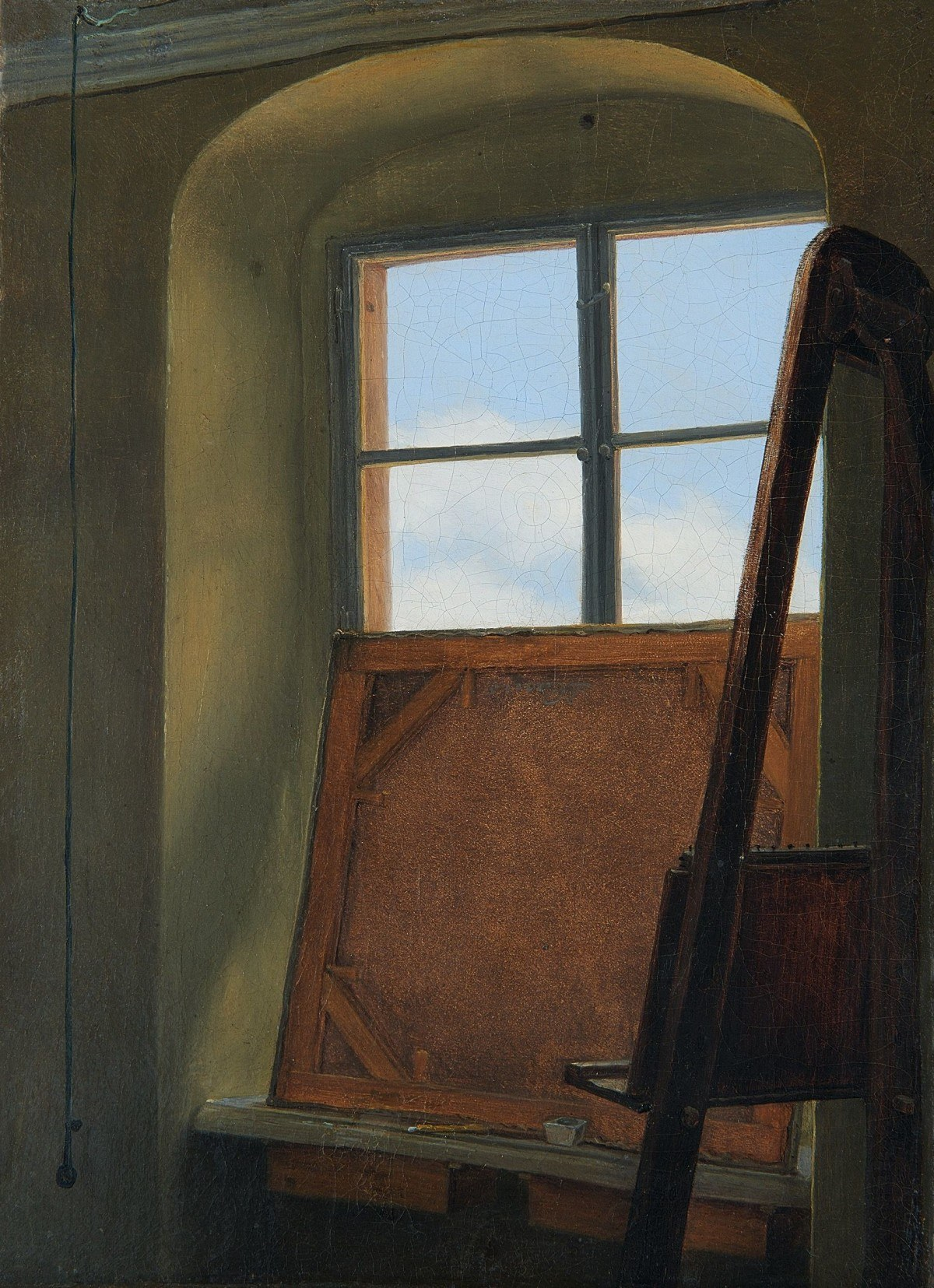
The Studio Window

== See also ==
- Philosophy of the Unconscious (von Hartmann)
- List of German painters

== Sources ==
- Jung, C.G. ([1959] 1969). The Archetypes and the Collective Unconscious, Collected Works, Volume 9, Part 1, Princeton, N.J.: Princeton University Press. ISBN 0-691-01833-2.
- "Carl GustavCarus", Art History: Romanticism
- Chisholm, Hugh, ed. (1911). "Carus, Karl Gustav" . Encyclopædia Britannica. Vol. 5 (11th ed.). Cambridge University Press. p. 436.
