= Özalp Özer =

Turkish-born American business professor

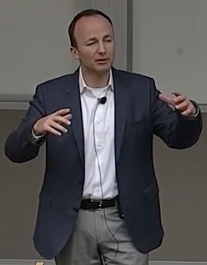
- Özer lecturing in 2015
- Born: Turkey

Academic background
- Education: Bilkent University and Columbia University

Academic work
- Discipline: Operations management; Operations Research; Management Science
- Institutions: Naveen Jindal School of Management
- Notable works: The Oxford Handbook of Pricing Management (2012)
- Website: www.ozalpozer.com

Özalp Özer is an American business professor specializing in pricing science and operations research. He is the Ashbel Smith Professor of Management Science at the Naveen Jindal School of Management and also currently serves as an affiliated faculty at the MIT Sloan School of Management.

== Career ==
Originally from Turkey, Özer attended Bilkent University, where he earned an undergraduate degree in Industrial Engineering in 1996. He then attended Columbia University where he received master's degrees in Operations Research and Financial Engineering, as well as a Ph.D. in Operations Research.

After receiving his Ph.D. in 2000, Özer worked as an assistant professor in the Management Science and Engineering Department at Stanford University until 2007. During this time he was awarded the Wickham Skinner Early-Career Research Accomplishment Award by the Informs Manufacturing and Service Operations Management (M&SOM) journal as well as the Eugene L. Grant Award for Excellence in Teaching at Stanford in 2004 and 2005. After working as an associate professor at Columbia University, he then took a position at the University of Texas at Dallas, at which time he was increasingly active in the M&SOM research community, receiving the M&SOM Meritorious Services Award in both 2011 and 2012.

While at the Naveen Jindal School of Management his research interest began to focus on behavioral factors and influences in supply chains. In 2013 his work was recognized as Runner-Up for the Behavioral Operations Management Society Best Working Paper Award. In 2014, Özer was awarded the Best Paper Award by Management Science for his research in Trust in Forecast Information Sharing.

Özer is currently one of the associate editors for the journals Management Science and Operations Research. Özer is also co-editor, along with Robert Phillips, of The Oxford Handbook of Pricing Management.
