= Öser (surname) =

Oeser is a surname. Notable people with the surname include:

- Adam Friedrich Oeser (1717–1799), German etcher, painter and sculptor.
- Fritz Oeser (1911–1982), German musicologist
- Jennifer Oeser (born 1983), German athlete
- Rudolf Oeser (1858–1926), German politician

== See also ==
- Oser (disambiguation)
- Özer
