= Ozer Schild =

Danish-Israeli academic administrator

- עוזר שילד
- Born: Erling Ozer Schild; September 25, 1930; Copenhagen, Denmark
- Died: 2006 (aged 75–76)
- Education: University of Copenhagen (master's degree in economics, 1957); Hebrew University of Jerusalem (doctorate in psychology and sociology, 1965); Johns Hopkins University (post-doctoral work)
- Known for: President of the University of Haifa; President of the College of Judea and Samaria, known as "Ariel College"

Erling Ozer Schild (Hebrew: עוזר שילד; September 25, 1930 – 2006), a Danish-born Israeli academic, was president of the University of Haifa and president of the College of Judea and Samaria, known as "Ariel College".

== Biography ==
Schild was born in Copenhagen, Denmark. He identified as an Orthodox Jew before the Holocaust, and was not affiliated after the WWII. During the Holocaust he went into hiding under a false identity in Copenhagen, and in Saunte, Denmark.

He completed a master's degree in economics in the University of Copenhagen in 1957, and then made aliyah and immigrated to Israel that year. In 1965, he received a doctorate in psychology and sociology from the Hebrew University of Jerusalem. After post-doctoral work at Johns Hopkins University in Baltimore, Maryland, he returned in 1968 to Israel to head the Psychology Department at Hebrew University.

Together with Daniel Kahneman, Schild volunteered to assist the Israel Air Force Flight Academy in improving its selection and training procedures. In 1973, he moved to Be'er Sheva to serve as Dean of the Humanities Department at Ben-Gurion University of the Negev. In 1974, he was appointed Chief Scientist of the Israel Education Ministry.

In 1976, Schild moved to the University of Haifa to head the School of Education. In 1978 he was appointed rector of the university.

Schild was appointed president of the University of Haifa in 1990.

In October 1993, Schild, with another four-year term ahead of him, resigned from the University of Haifa presidency and moved from Haifa to Ariel. At the College of Judea and Samaria, known as "Ariel College," Schild taught statistics and research methods. He later became president of the college there.

He and his wife had two children.
