= Yehuda HaKohen ben Meir =

Yehuda ben Meir, also known as Yehudah Leontin, was a rabbi and Talmudic scholar of the late tenth and early eleventh century CE.

Yehuda was the principal teacher of Gershom ben Judah, and his work was highly influential on the later writings of Rashi. Yehuda was surnamed, according to some sources, either "Léon", "Léonṭe", "Léonṭin", "Sire Léon", and "Sire Léonṭin", and was designated as "the grand" and "the gaon."

His grandson was also Rabbi Yehuda ben Meir of Mainz who was the author of Sefer ha-Dinim which contains an account of his travels and those of other Jews in Eastern Europe. In this work, Przemyśl and Kyiv are mentioned as trading sites along the Radhanite trade network.
