= Robert L. Phillips =

American entrepreneur, academic and author

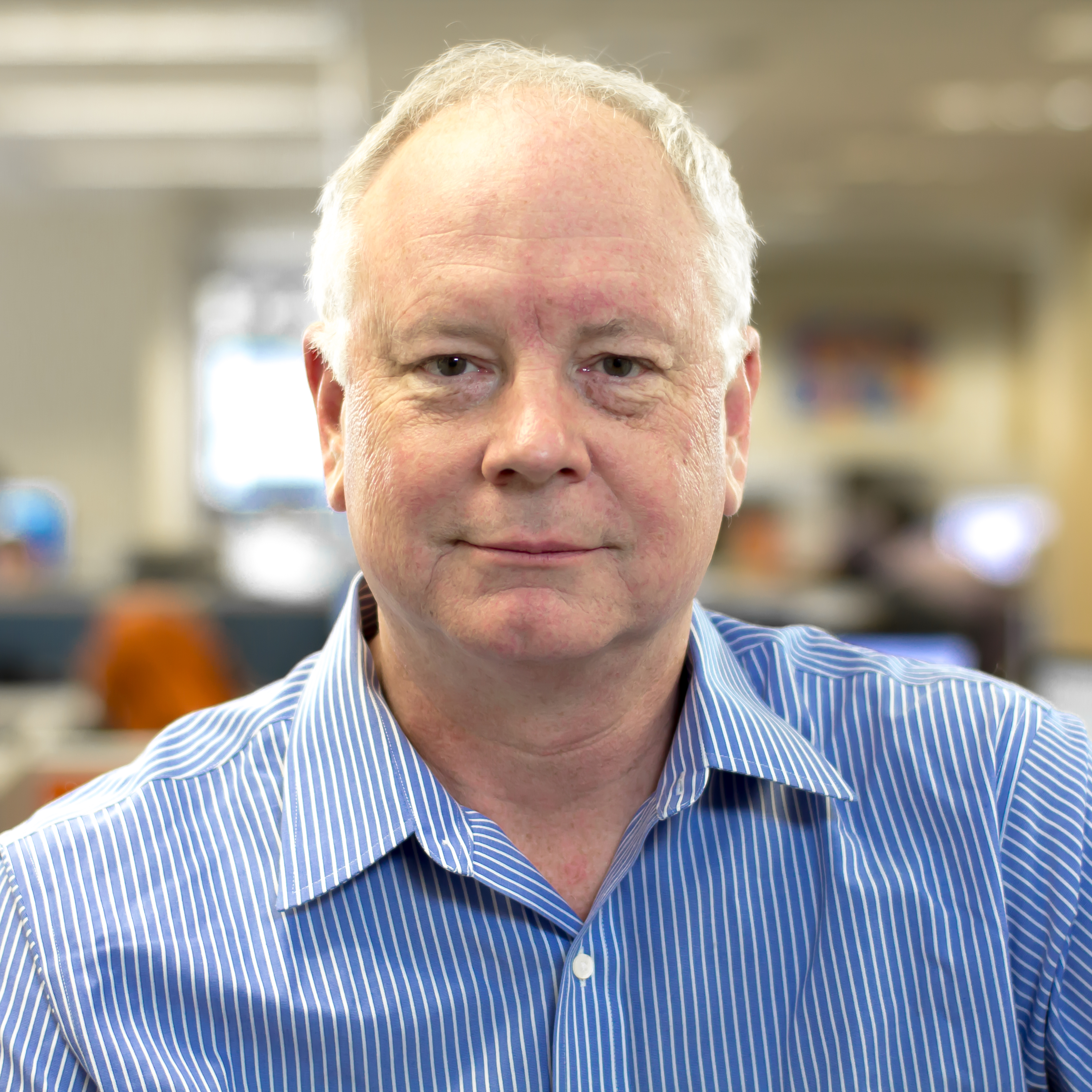
- Education: Stanford University and Washington State University
- Occupations: Founder, Nomis Solutions
- Years active: 25
- Notable work: Pricing and Revenue Optimization (2005); The Oxford Handbook of Pricing Management (2012); Pricing Credit Products (2018).

Robert Phillips is an American entrepreneur, academic and author. He was previously director of marketplace optimization sciences at Uber. He is also founder of Nomis Solutions, a Silicon Valley company specializing in pricing science and practice for financial institutions. Previously, he was professor of Professional Practice at Columbia Business School and director of Columbia University’s Center for Pricing and Revenue Management. Phillips is author of the book Pricing and Revenue Optimization, a textbook on revenue management (also called yield management) and pricing optimization tactics. He was also co-editor of The Oxford Handbook of Pricing Management.

Phillips earned a Ph.D. in Engineering-Economic Systems from Stanford University and has undergraduate degrees in Mathematics and Economics from Washington State University. Prior to starting Nomis Solutions, Phillips was chief technology officer of Manugistics. He also was founder and chief executive officer for Talus Solutions, which was acquired by Manugistics in 2000 and chief executive officer of Decision Focus Incorporated, a management consulting company. He was elected to the 2014 class of Fellows of the Institute for Operations Research and the Management Sciences.

== Selected publications ==
- Phillips, R., (2020) Pricing and Revenue Optimization. 2nd Edition. Stanford University Press.
- Ozer, O and Phillips, (eds.) (2012). The Oxford Handbook of Pricing Management. Oxford: Oxford University Press.
- Phillips, R., (2018). Pricing Credit Products. Stanford University Press.
