= Cenk Enes Özer =

Turkish novelist (born 1978)

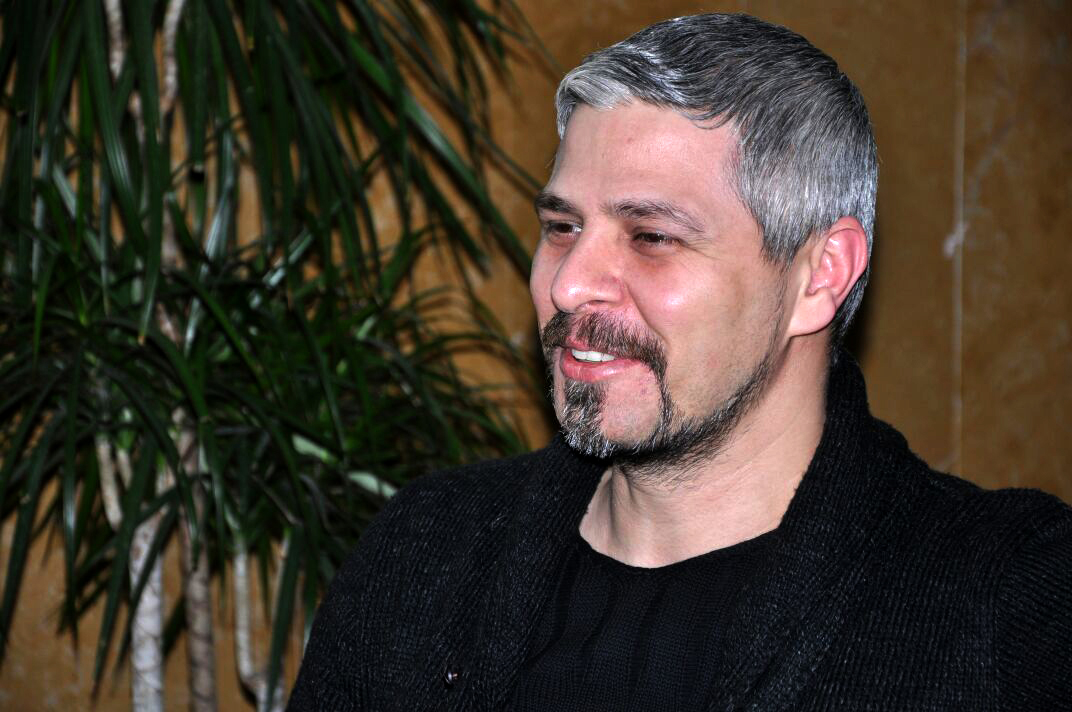
- Özer in 2015
- Born: December 1978 (age 47); Turkey
- Education: Anadolu University
- Occupation: Writer
- Movement: Spiritualism; mysticism; fiction
- Website: hizmetkar.com.tr

Cenk Enes Özer (Turkish pronunciation: [ˈdʒæɲc eˈnes œˈzæɾ]; born December 1978) is a Turkish novelist.

== Early life and education ==
Cenk Enes Özer was born in December 1978 and lives in Ankara. In 1996, he went to Eskişehir to study for his bachelor's degree at Anadolu University. Then, he returned to Ankara after he graduated from the Department of Finance in 2000.

== Career ==
After graduation, Özer completed his military duty and worked in different job positions until 2007 when he started his work as an author.
He published his first book "Hizmetkar kim?" in 2007 and it was the first book in a series of seven books called "Hizmetkar Serisi". Starting from 2007, Cenk Enes Özer issues a new book a year to be totally up today 9 books which have gotten interests of a large number of readers in Turkey particularly from youth. "Hizmetkar Serisi" includes "Hizmetkar Kim?", "Kara Kutu Operasyonu", "Pindaros'un Kitabı", "Kılıcın Bekçileri", "Şeytan Severse", "Sinova" and "Adalia". Özer ended up his first series of novels "Hizmetkar Serisi" by the last book "Adalia" in 2013. In the beginning of 2014, "Süleyman: Piyonun Yolu" book was published for him and the fiction level of this book has fascinated lots of readers. Recently, another book was published for the author as a complementary novel for "Süleyman: Piyonun Yolu" which is named "Süleyman II: Oyunun Sonu".
Özer pays a lot of his attention to his books readers; as well, he shares in activities at schools and other institutes in Turkey to spread his ideas to help and encourage the youth toward developing their creativities under saying "Why not? Don't start saying it's impossible, but asking how it can be possible." Cenk enes özer was invited to a TEDx Talk by Kılıçaslan High School in Kayseri, Turkey; and on the twelfth of April 2014 he shared in that event with a motivating talk about a unique explanation of the faith sense in title: "İnancın Eşsiz Anlatımı."
Özer is busy with preparations for his new books, signing days and meeting people who are interested in his ideas. At the same time, he participates in a lot of activities to help the youth motivationally in different occasions.

== Bibliography ==
In Turkish

- Hizmetkar Kim?, published: 2007, last version: October 2012, 192 pages, ISBN 9786056240294
- Kara Kutu Operasyonu, published: 2008, last version: November 2012, 168 pages, ISBN 9786055314033
- Pindaros’un Kitabı, published: 2009, last version: February 2012, 183 pages, ISBN 9786055314064
- Kılıcın Bekçiler, published: 2010, last version: April 2012, 192 pages, ISBN 9786055314132
- Şeytan Severse, published: 2011, last version: January 2012, 213 pages, ISBN 9786056240249
- Sinova, published: 2012, last version: September 2012, 210 pages, ISBN 9786055314248
- Adalia, published: 2013, last version: March 2013, 245 pages, ISBN 9786055314392
- SÜLEY-MAN I: Piyonun Yolu, published: 2014, last version: March 2014, 242 pages, ISBN 9786055314651
- SÜLEY-MAN II: Oyunun Sonu, published: 2015, last version: March 2015, 242 pages, ISBN 9786059927314
- Zamansız Yağmur Başlıyor, published: 2017 February 13, 280 pages, ISBN 9786059820202

In English

- The Servant, (The translation of Hizmetkar Kim?) published: 2015, last version: August 2015, 220 pages, ISBN 9781935295853
