= Deniz Özer =

Turkish-German footballer (born 1987)

Personal information
- Full name: Deniz Nadia Özer
- Date of birth: 2 March 1987 (age 39)
- Place of birth: Flörsheim am Main, West Germany
- Position: Midfielder

Senior career*
Years	Team	Apps	(Gls)
2004–2005	1. FFC Frankfurt II	15	(0)
2005–2006	FSV Frankfurt	21	(1)
2006–2007	VfL Wolfsburg	7	(0)
2007	SG Wattenscheid 09	12	(1)
2008	TGM SV Jügesheim	7	(3)
2008–2011	SG Essen-Schonebeck	24	(0)
2011–2013	1. FFC Frankfurt II	37	(14)
2013–2017	TSV Schott Mainz	61	(17)
2013–2017	Eintracht Frankfurt	6	(0)
2018	Karlsruher SC	0	(0)
2018–2020	SV Bretzenheim 1912	20	(8)
Total		210	(44)

International career^{‡}
2009–2011	Turkey	13	(0)
- * Club domestic league appearances and goals ‡ National team caps and goals as of 29 April 2011

Deniz Nadia Özer (born 2 March 1987), also known as Nadia Özer, is a German former professional women's association football midfielder of Turkish descent. Having dual citizenship, she was a member of the Turkish national team.

== Club career ==
Born into a sports-oriented family, her mother wanted her to be a handball player. She liked football because her father is a football coach. She started her career at 1. FFC Frankfurt II when she was ten years old only. She played in the midfielder position. After appearing for VfL Wolfsburg, SG Wattenscheid 09 and others, she transferred to SG Essen-Schonebeck in 2008 to play in the topflight Frauen-Bundesliga. She then returned to her former club 1. FFC Frankfurt playing in the Frauen-Bundesliga. In Bischofsheim, where she lives, Özer was offered a job in 2012 by the local football club Sportfreunde to help children with a migration background integrate better through football during the free time between her trainings in the professional club 1. FFC Frankfurt. She coached the girls' youth team a half season long. In the 2013–14 season, she played for TSV Schott Mainz, which finished the season as champion of the Frauen-Regionalliga Südwest, and was to be promoted to the 2. Frauen-Bundesliga. However, due to incompleteness of application documents, the German Football Association rejected the promotion. During her second season at SV Bretzenheim 1912, the further matches of the entire season were cancelled as the season was abandoned due to COVID-19 pandemic in Germany.

== International career ==
Owning dual citizenship, Özer was called up to the Turkey women's national football team in 2009, and capped eleven times, before she played two friendly matches against Greece in 2011.

== Personal life ==
Deniz Nadia Özer was born to a Turkish father and a German mother in Flörsheim am Main, West Germany on 2 March 1987. Her father is a football coach and her brother is also a professional footballer. She lives in Bischofsheim, Hesse.
