= Ozer ben Meir =

Polish rabbi

- Died: May 1710 Zolkiev, Polish–Lithuanian Commonwealth

Religious life
- Religion: Judaism

Ozer ben Meir (Hebrew: עוזר בן מאיר, romanized: ʿOzer ben Meʾir; died May 1710) was a Polish rabbi of Clementow. He was a great-grandson of Solomon Luria.

Ozer was the author of Even 'Ozer 'al Yad (Amsterdam, 1742), on the Yoreh De'ah, on Oraḥ Ḥayyim, and on Even ha-'Ezer; novellæ on some massektot (Zolkiev, 1753); and others of a similar character, published in Maginne Eretz (Amsterdam, 1753).
