= Pillnitz Palace =

Château in Dresden, Germany

Coordinates: 51°0′32.08″N 13°52′12.57″E

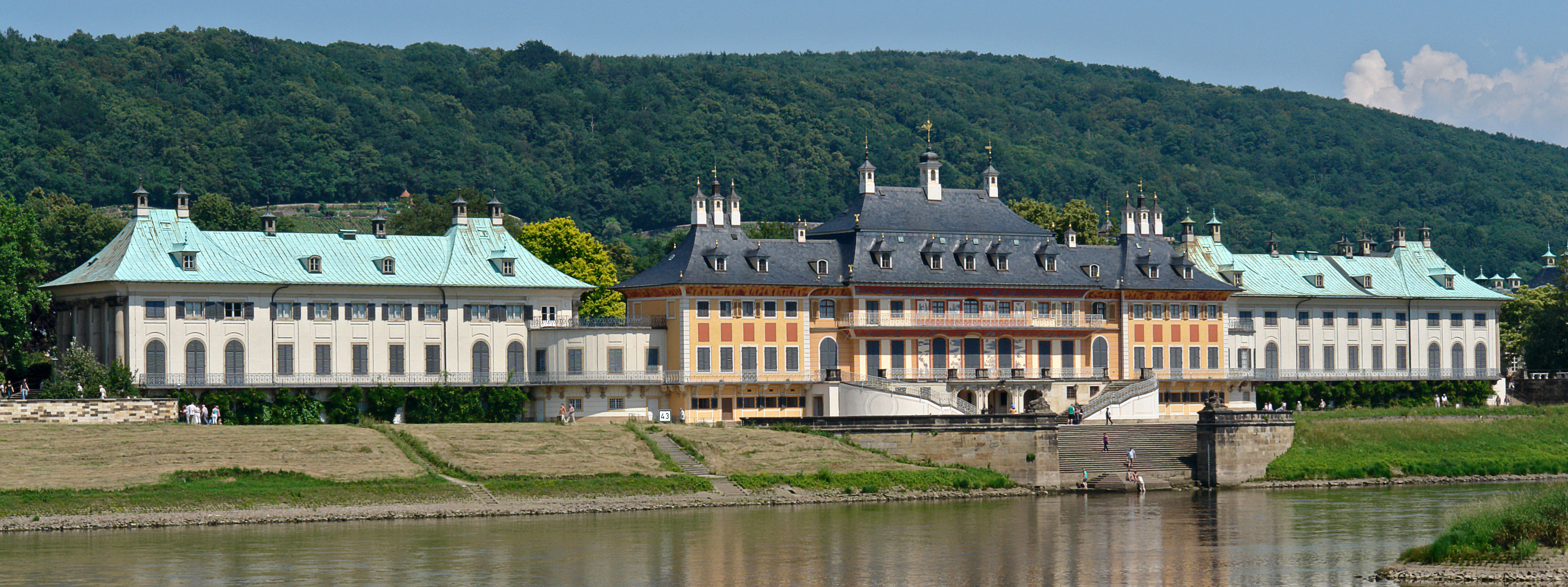
Riverside Palace (Wasserpalais)

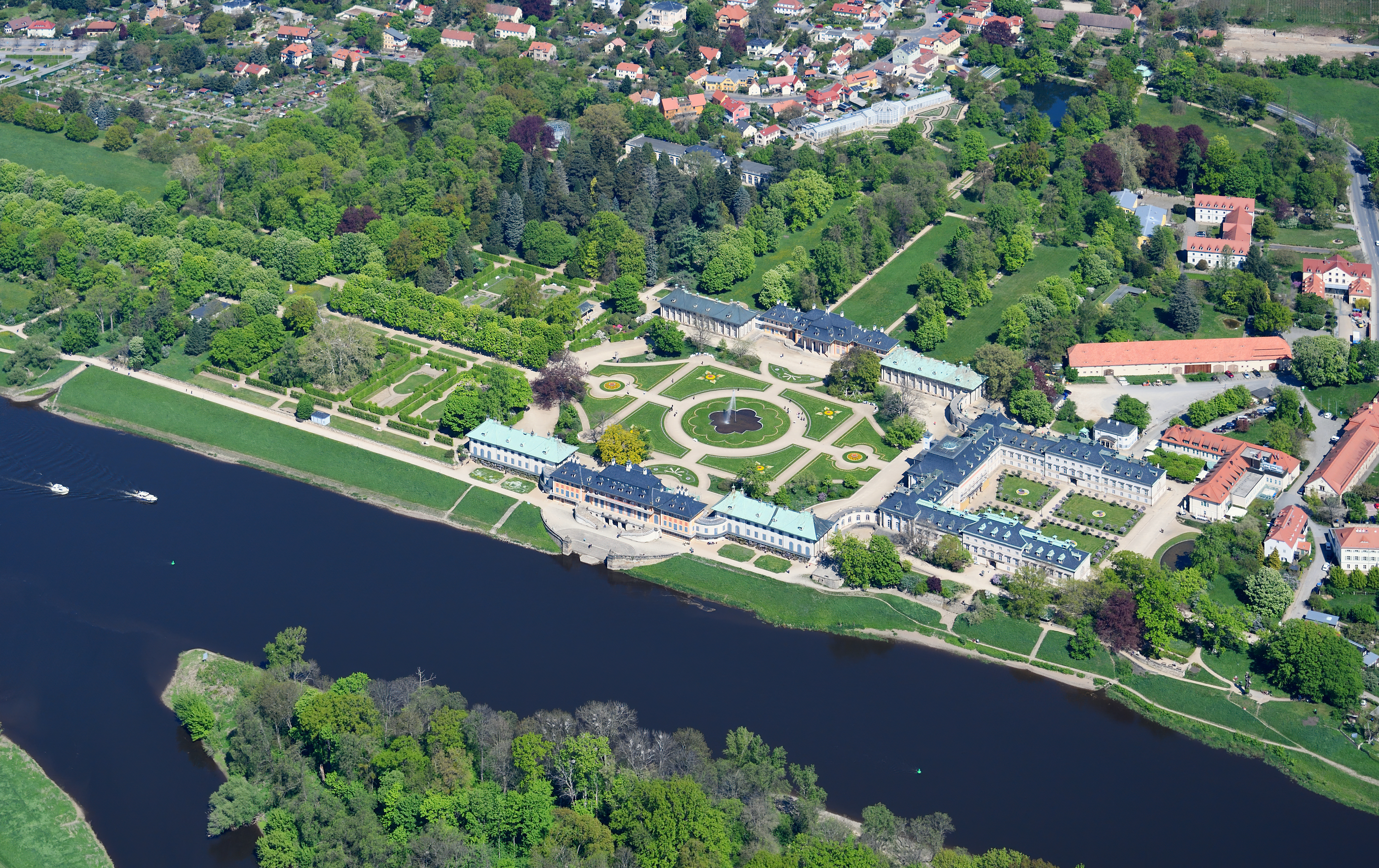
Aerial view of the Pillnitz Palace and its park

Pillnitz Palace (German: Schloss Pillnitz) is a restored Baroque castle at the eastern end of the city of Dresden in the German state of Saxony. It is located on the right bank of the River Elbe in the former village of Pillnitz. It was the summer residence of many electors and kings of Saxony; it is also known for the Declaration of Pillnitz in 1791.

The complex consists of three main buildings, the Riverside Palace (Wasserpalais) on the riverfront; the Upper Palace (Bergpalais) on the hillside, both Baroque with Chinoiserie elements; and the later Neoclassical New Palace (Neues Palais), which links them together on the east side. The buildings enclose a Baroque garden and are surrounded by a large public park.

Today, the buildings house the arts and crafts museum (Kunstgewerbemuseum) of the Dresden State Art Collections and a Schlossmuseum.

== History ==
As early as the 14th century, a modest residential fortress existed on the site of today's palace. It was enlarged in the 16th and 17th centuries to a four-winged building. The château was acquired by the Wettin dynasty in 1694 when Elector John George IV of Saxony bought it as a present for his mistress, Magdalena Sibylla of Neidschutz. Both died soon afterwards. In 1706, John George's brother Augustus II the Strong gave the facilities to one of his numerous mistresses, Anna Constantia of Brockdorff, only to rescind the gift after she fled to Berlin in 1715. Augustus II then ordered the château to be converted into an oriental summer palace for riverside festivities, necessitating extensive rebuilding.

Starting in 1720, the first church and buildings were replaced by elaborate Baroque palaces designed by Matthäus Daniel Pöppelmann and Zacharias Longuelune. First, in 1720/21, the Riverside Palace (Wasserpalais) was constructed on the river bank to plans by Pöppelmann. The upper staircase built on the Elbe side in 1722 was supplemented in 1725 by water stairs forming a gondola dock, designed by the French architect Zacharias Longuelune. In 1723/24, an almost identical complement to the Riverside Palace, the Upper Palace (Bergpalais), was completed. At the same time, a garden was laid out between the two palaces. Construction continued until 1725, with a focus on the Chinoiserie style. Augustus apparently then lost interest in his renovated palace, shifting his focus to other locations.

In 1765, Elector Frederick Augustus I of Saxony, a great-grandson of Augustus the Strong, made Pillnitz his summer residence. At the time, an English garden with an English pavilion, a Chinese garden with a Chinese pavilion and an artificial ruin were added. When the Countess' palace burnt down in 1818, Frederick Augustus asked his architect, Christian Friedrich Schuricht, to design a new palace at the same location. The Neoclassical New Palace (Neues Palais) was completed in 1826.

Schloss Pillnitz was used as the summer residence of the House of Wettin until 1918.

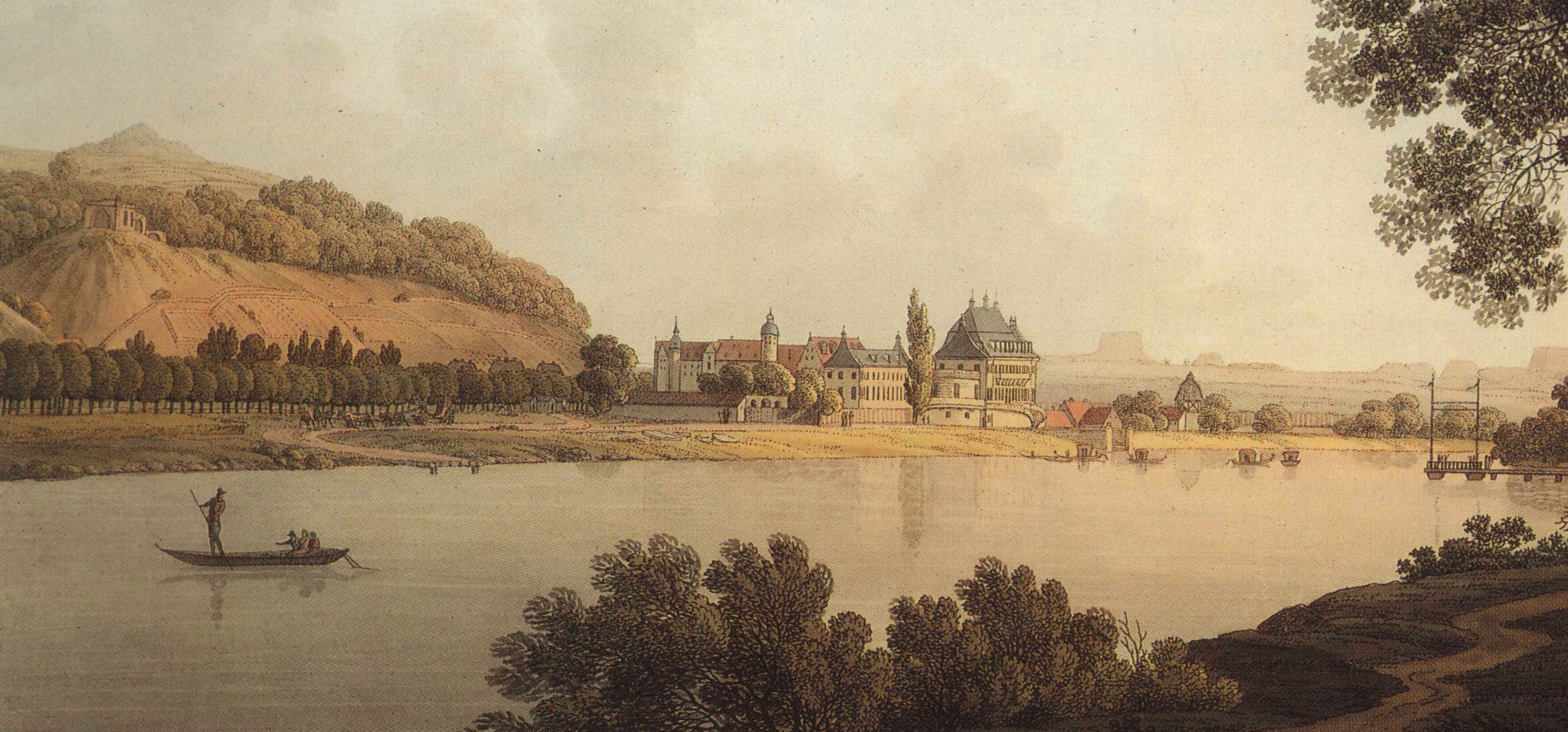
Schloss Pillnitz in 1800

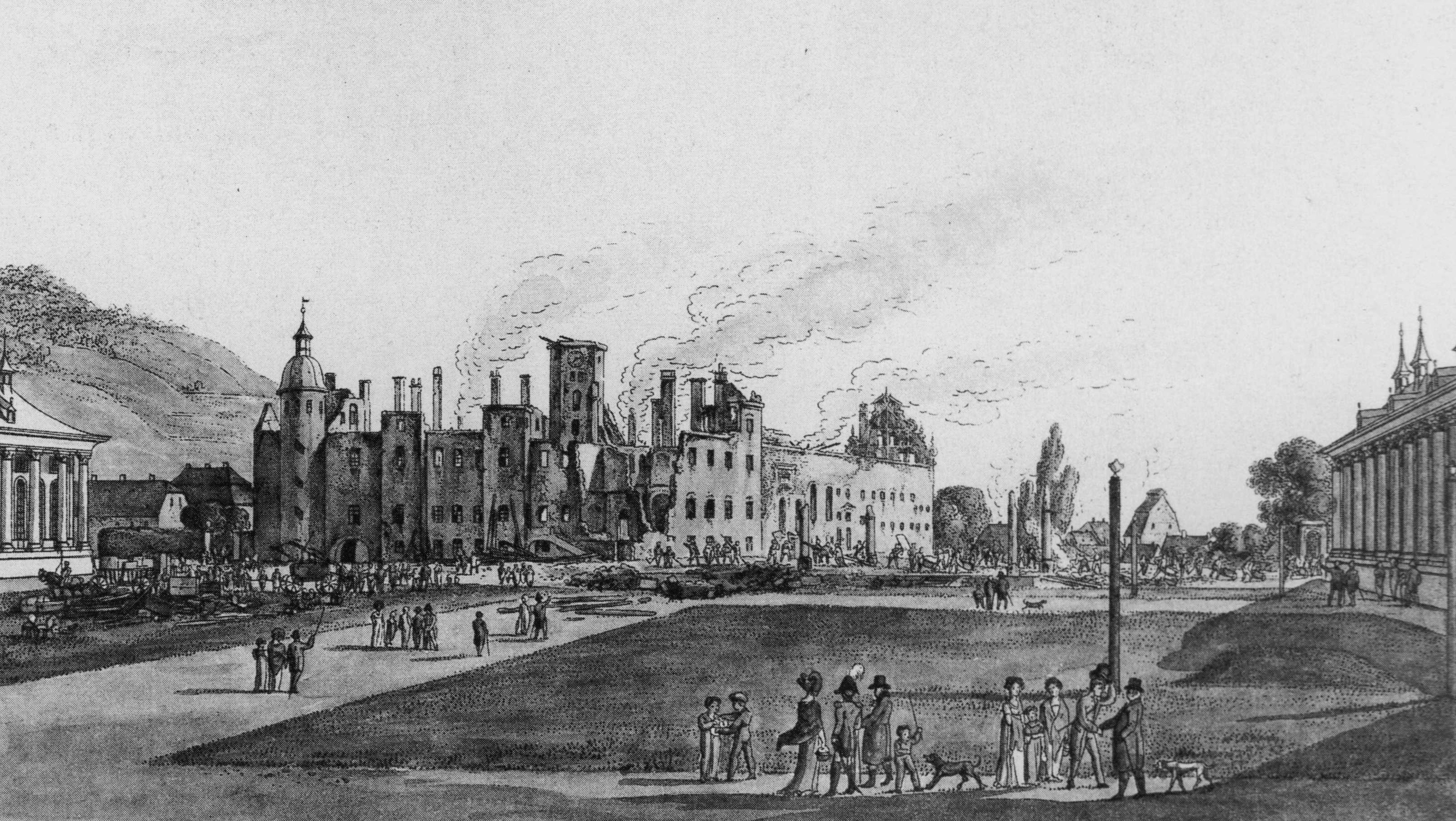
Ruins of the Countess' palace after the fire of 1818

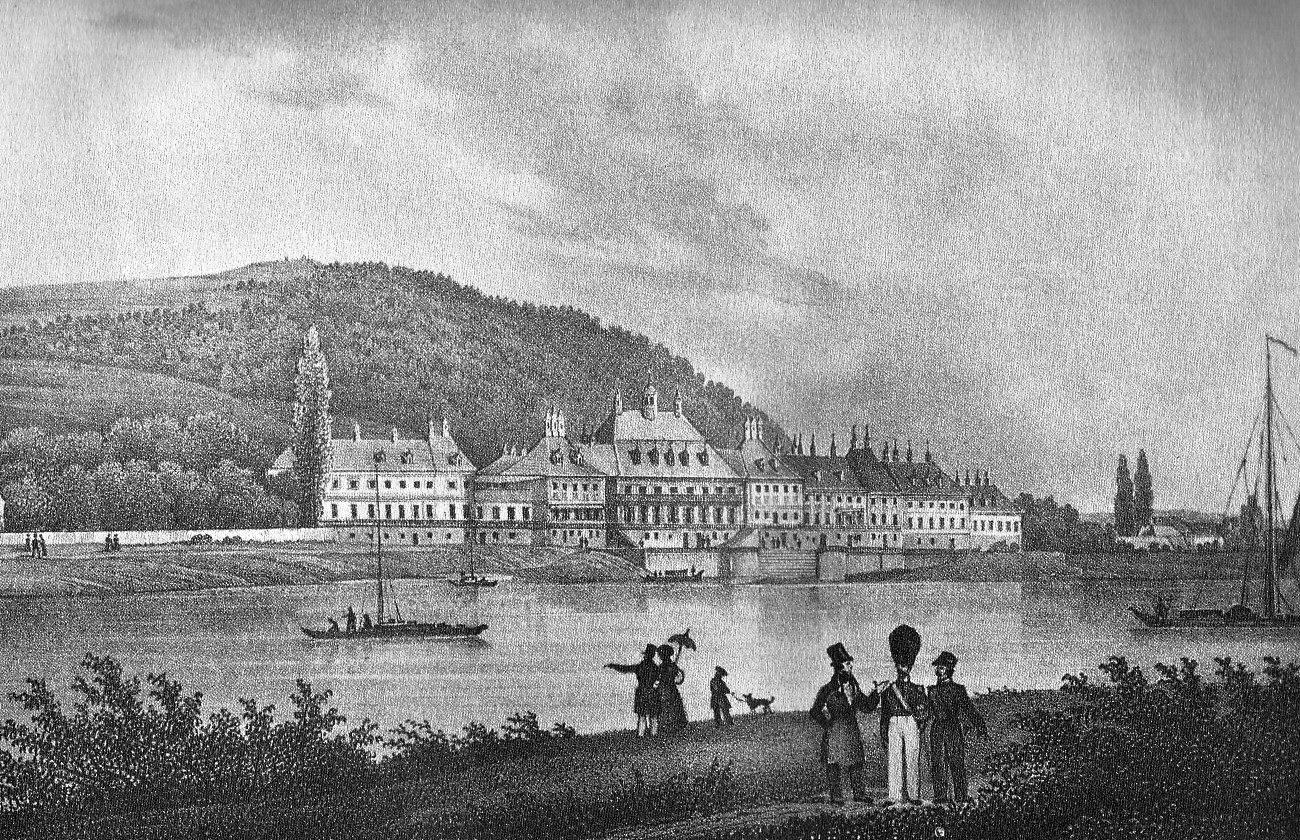
Schloss Pillnitz circa 1850

== Buildings ==
The main buildings are the Hillside Palace (Bergpalais), built between 1722 and 1723, the Riverside Palace (Wasserpalais), built between 1720 and 1721, and the New Palace. The Riverside Palace has elegant steps down to the river. The two older palaces are connected on the east side by the New Palace (Neues Palais), built in Neoclassical style between 1819 and 1826 after the Countess' palace burnt down in 1818. The New Palace contains a central hall with a dome, the royal kitchen, a Catholic chapel, and several more rooms. The roofs and moldings in each of the buildings exemplify the Oriental-influenced chinoiserie style fashionable during that period.

Today, the New Palace contains the Palace Museum (Schlossmuseum) with a permanent exhibition presenting its eventful history as a former royal Saxon summer residence. It houses the only neo-classical domed hall in Dresden, opened in 1823. The royal kitchen shows “cooking machines” and original copper pots and pans in its reconstructed historical setting. Here, approximately 27 employees prepared meals for the royal family and their entourage. The Catholic chapel in the eastern wing of the New Palace is also part of the Palace Museum. Its multiple frescos by the court painter, Carl Christian Vogel von Vogelstein, depict scenes from the life of the Virgin Mary.

The Hillside Palace and Riverside Palace house the Arts and Crafts Museum (Kunstgewerbemuseum) of the Dresden State Art Collections. It exhibits furniture, ceramics and other objects from the 13th to the 20th century, including the throne of Augustus II. Some of the exhibition rooms retain the original decoration.

The visitor center is located in the Alte Wache (Old Guardhouse), a small building east of the New Palace.

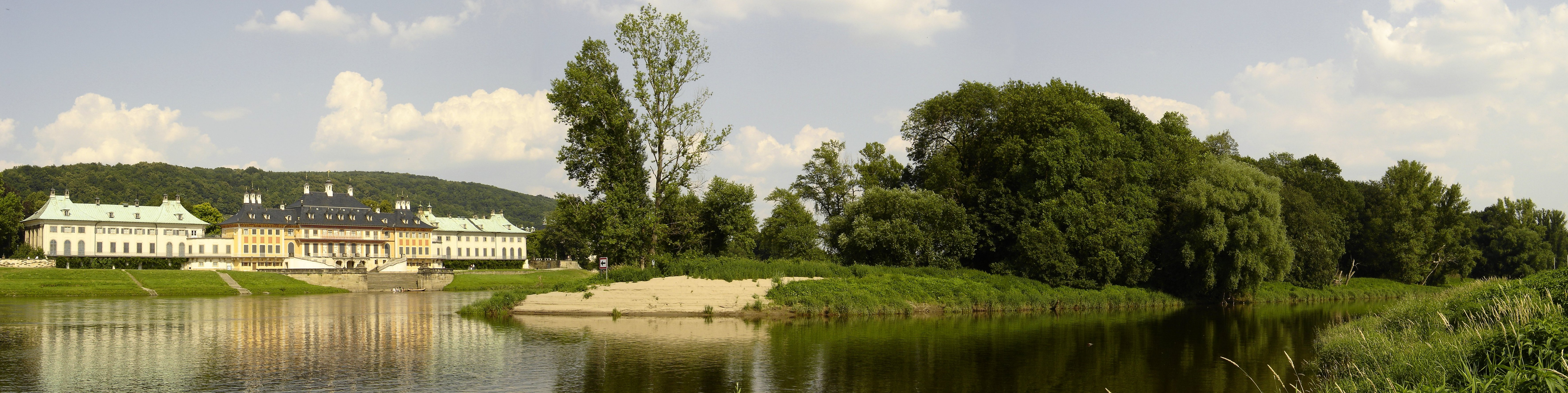
Riverside Palace with, in the foreground, the elongated isle and nature reserve on the Elbe

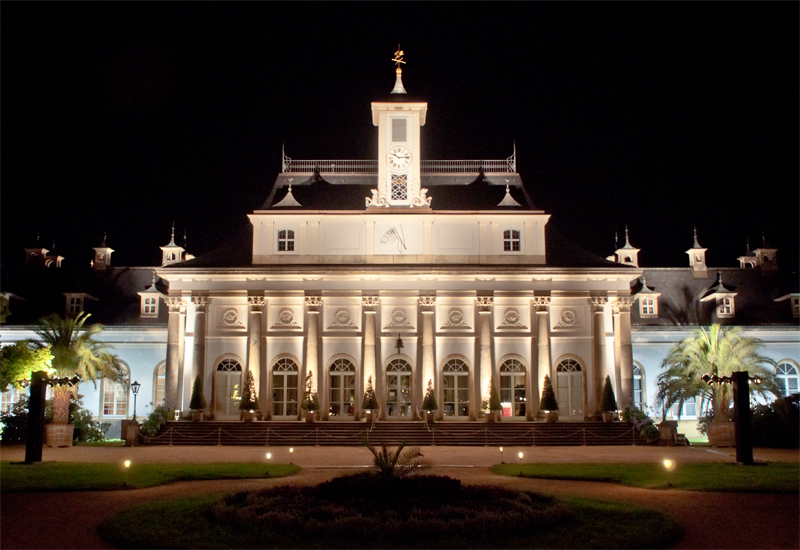
Night view of the New Palace

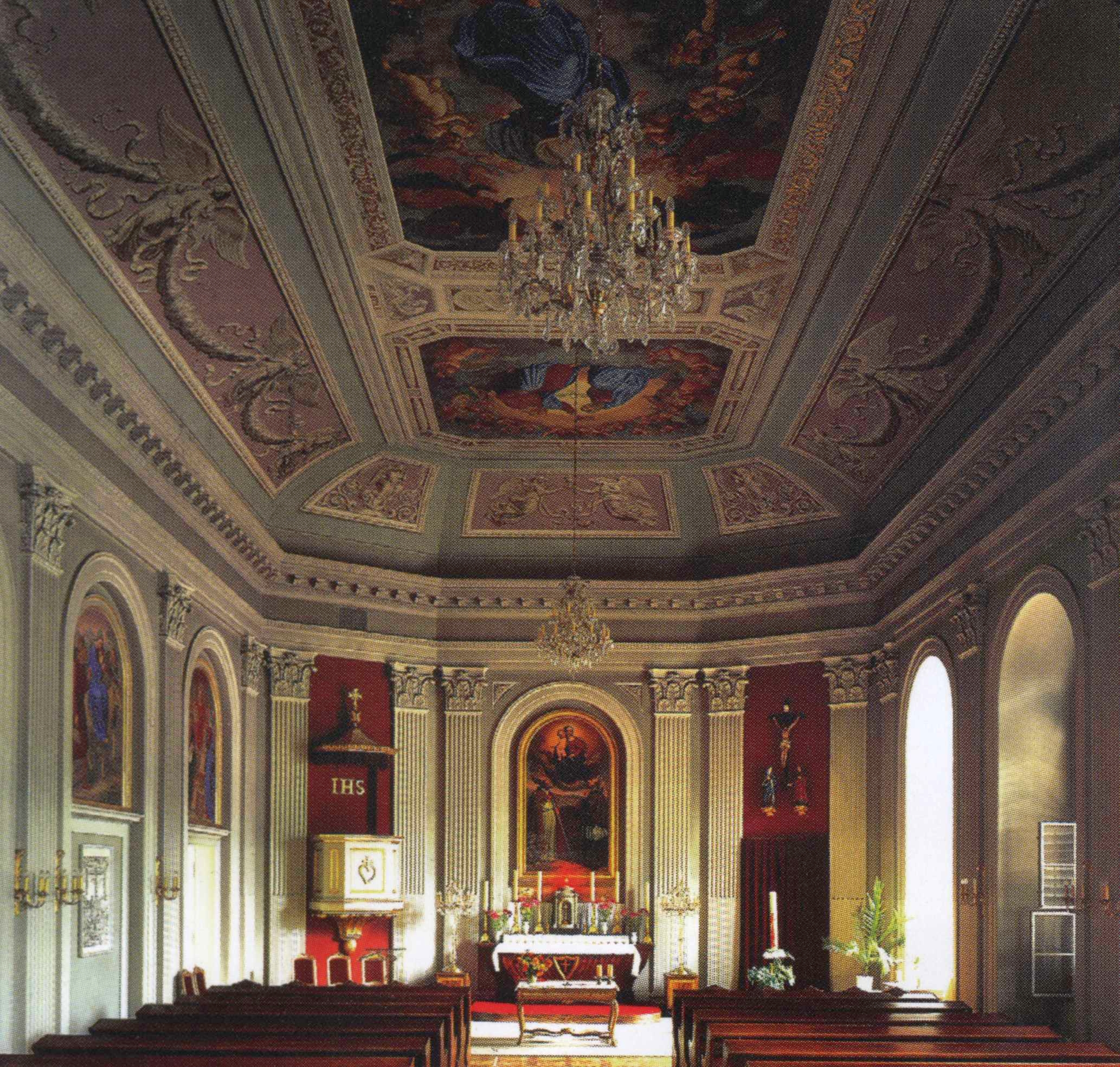
Interior of the Catholic chapel

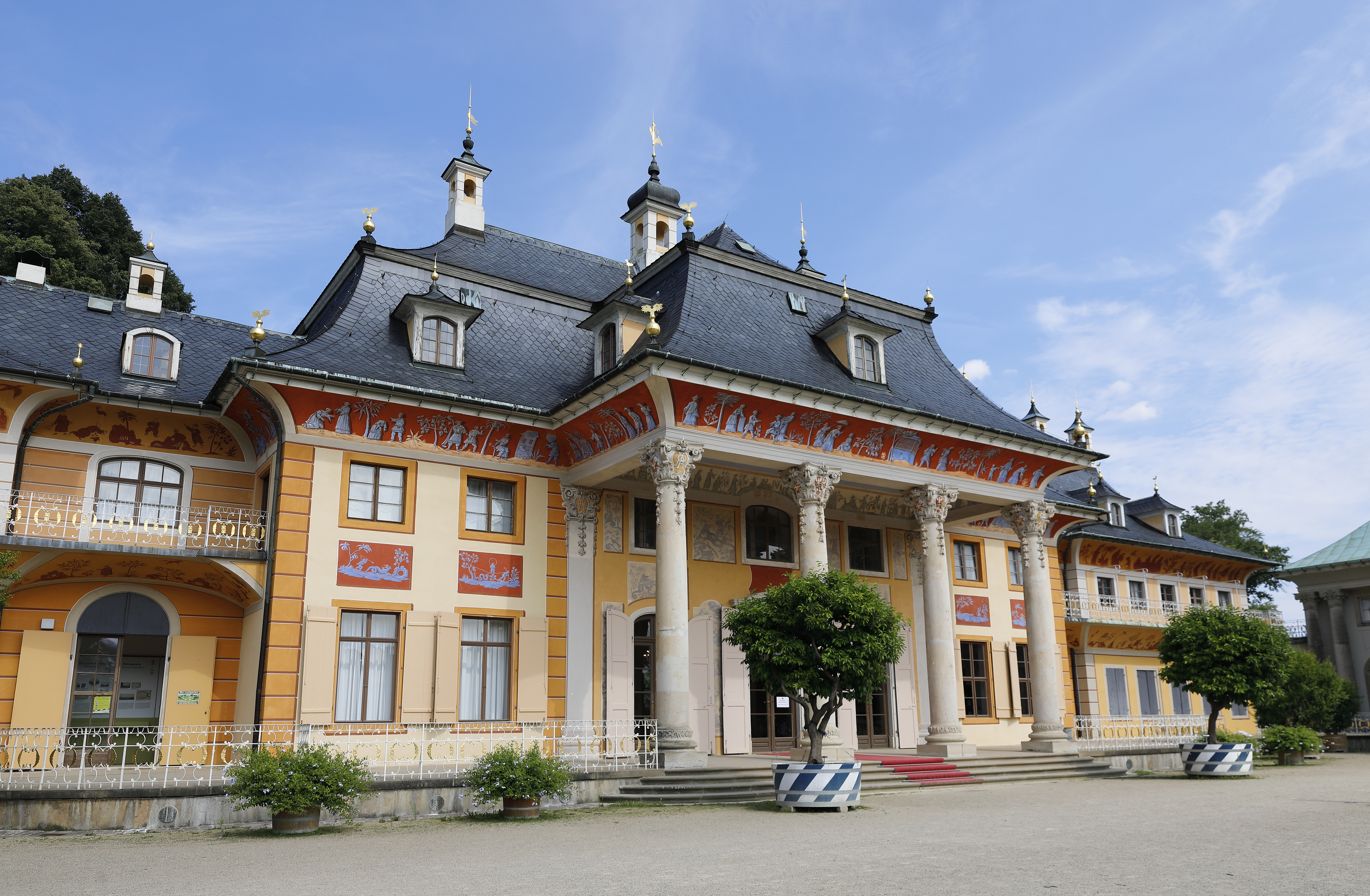
Hillside Palace

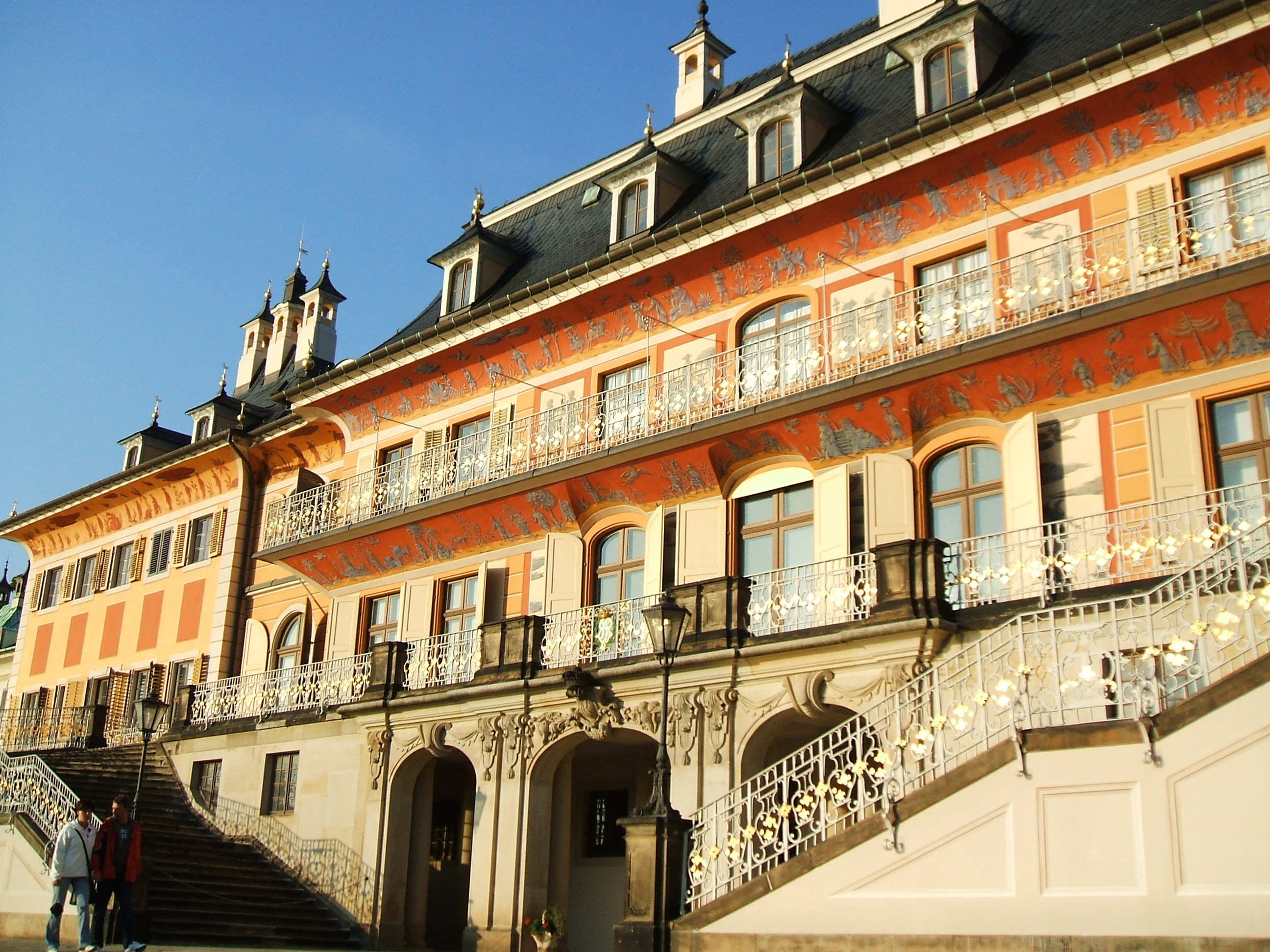
Riverside Palace

== The park ==
The buildings surround a Baroque flower garden, whose centrepiece is a pond with a large fountain. From this, a chestnut-lined allée approximately 500 metres (1,600 feet) long runs parallel to the river bank, flanked by small rectangular hedged parterres.

The 28-hectare park surrounding the main buildings contains botanical attractions from all over the world. Among them is a camellia tree more than 230 years old – one of the oldest in Europe. Legend has it that Carl Peter Thunberg brought it from Kyoto to Kew Gardens in 1776. The Camellia japonica was planted in its current location in 1801. It extends 8.9 metres (29 feet) and, from February to April, produces up to 35,000 blooms. During wintertime, the tree is protected by a glass house on rails.

The park also features a late 18th-century English garden with an English pavilion, a Chinese pavilion, a conifer garden and an orangery. The English pavilion, built in 1780, is a copy of Donato Bramante's Tempietto in Rome. It is located next to a pond in the English garden. A statue with the head of Juno Ludovisi, a replica from the Roman marble head of the 1st century A.D. that is now in the National Museum of Rome, was placed on the pond's island in the English Garden in the 19th century. In 1804, the Chinese Pavilion was erected on the northern edge of the park. While the Chinese elements are only decorations, this small pavilion was built in the authentic Chinese style. The paintings on the walls inside depict actual Chinese landscapes.

Also shown is a replica of the red royal gondola which Frederick Augustus I used for transport between his residence in Dresden, the royal palace, and his country seat in Pillnitz. Together with its green counterpart, the original red gondola was built under the supervision of the architect Christian Friedrich Schuricht around 1800. Deterioration of both gondolas required a restoration in 1954, when this replica was built by using parts from both boats.

The palm house was built between 1859 and 1861. Covering 660 square metres and 93.7 m (307 ft) in length, it was the largest greenhouse in Germany at the time. After extensive restoration completed in 2009, it now contains plants from Australia and South Africa.

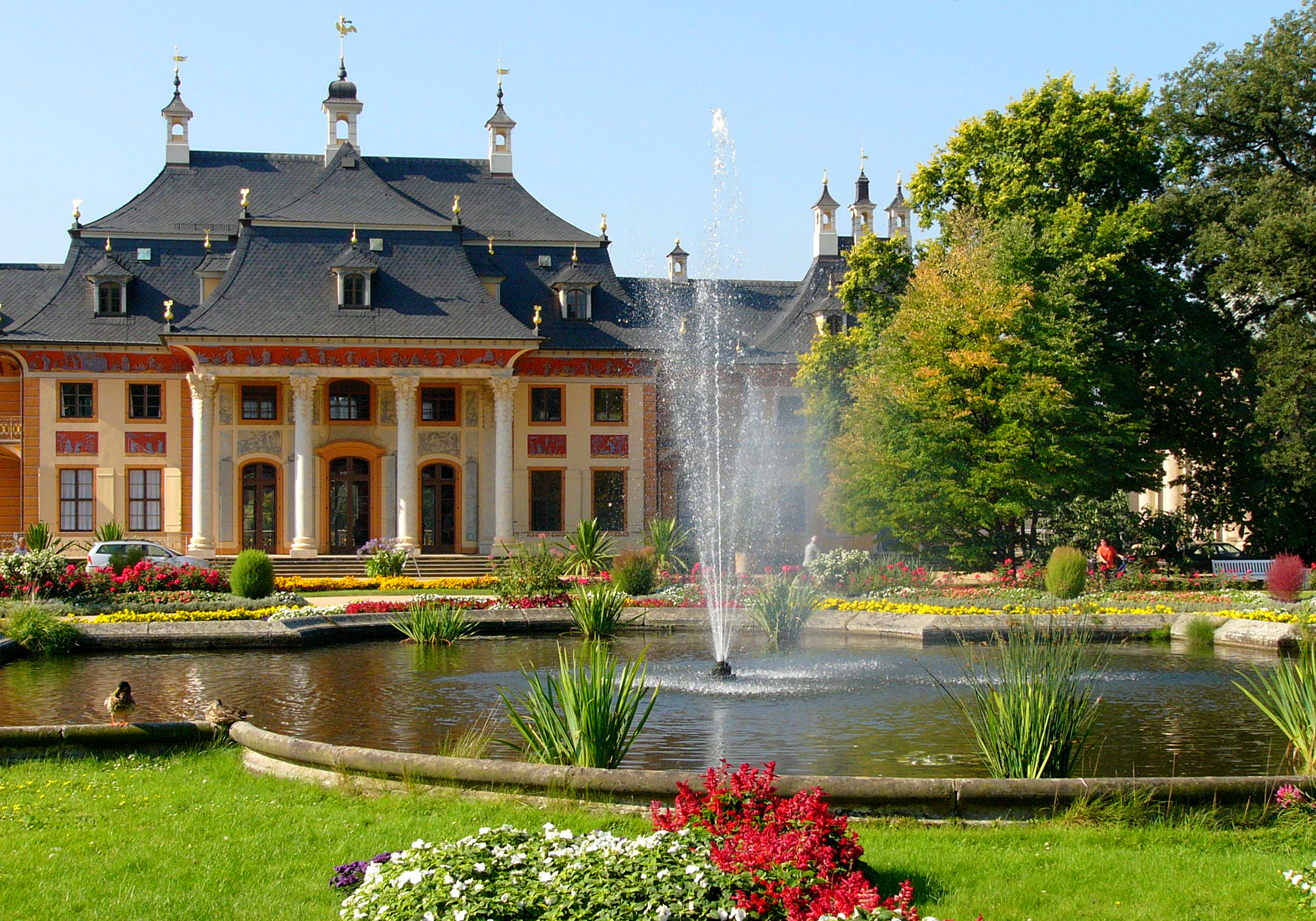
Hillside Palace with the Baroque garden and fountain

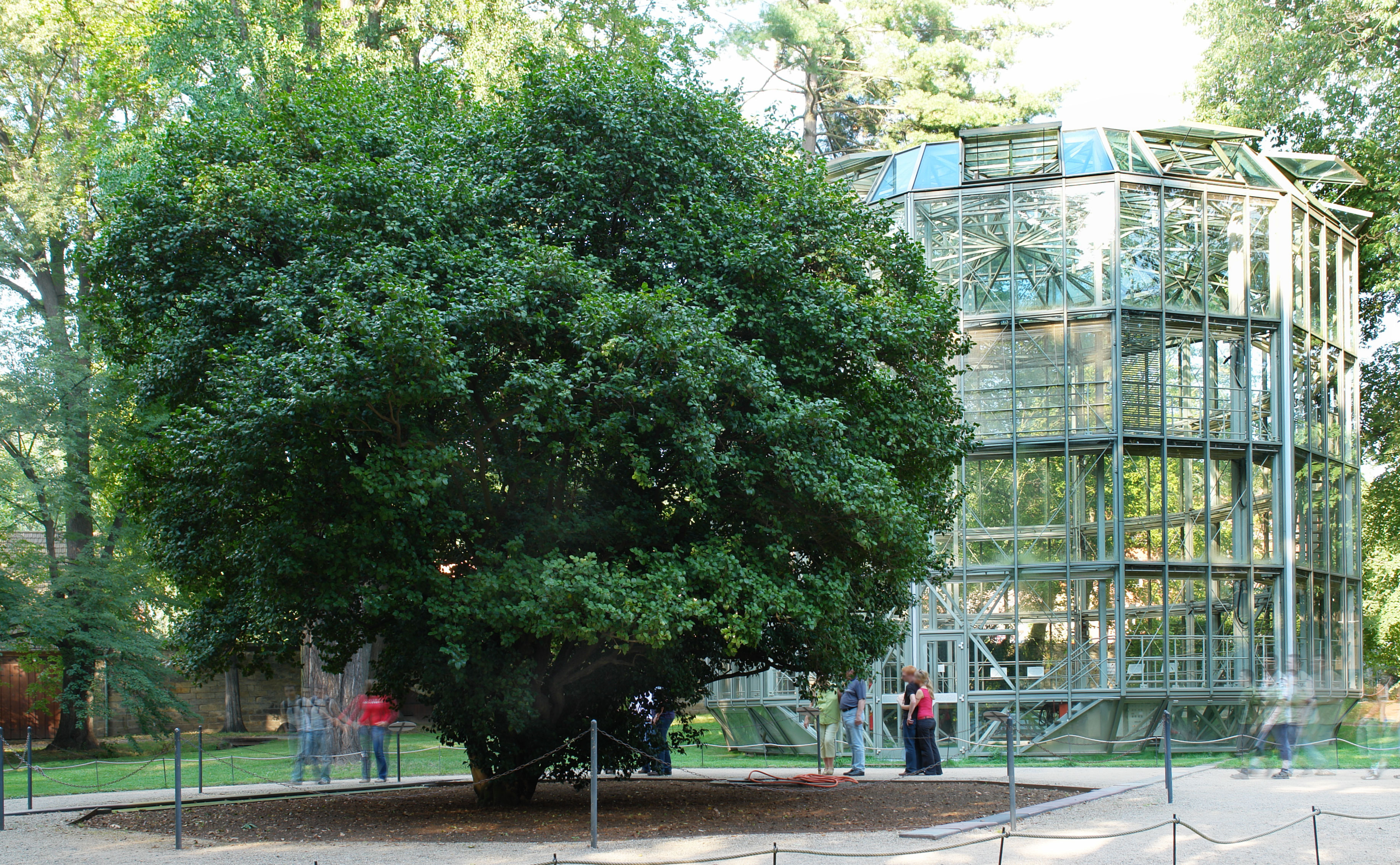
The camellia tree with its glass house

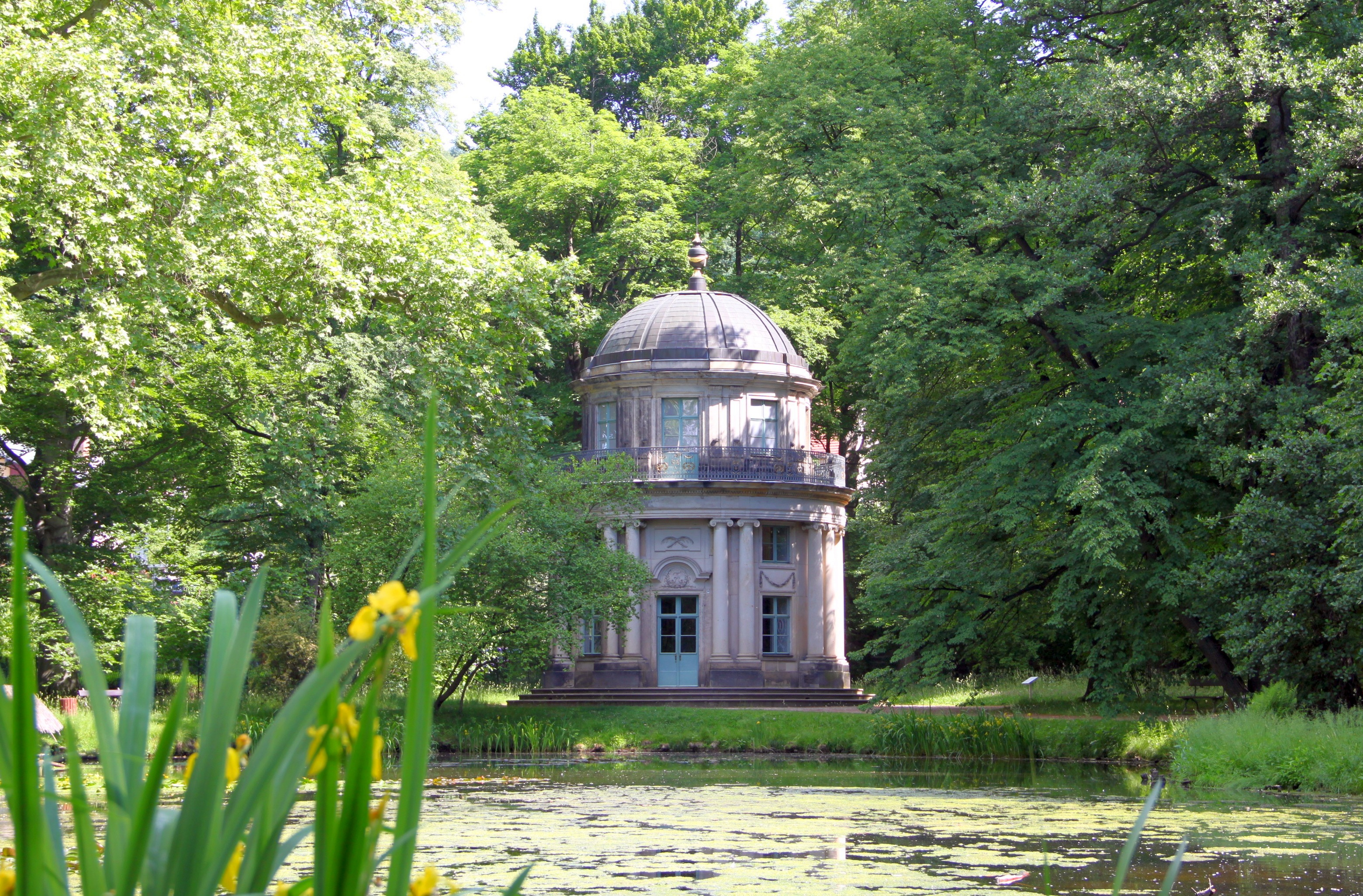
English pavilion

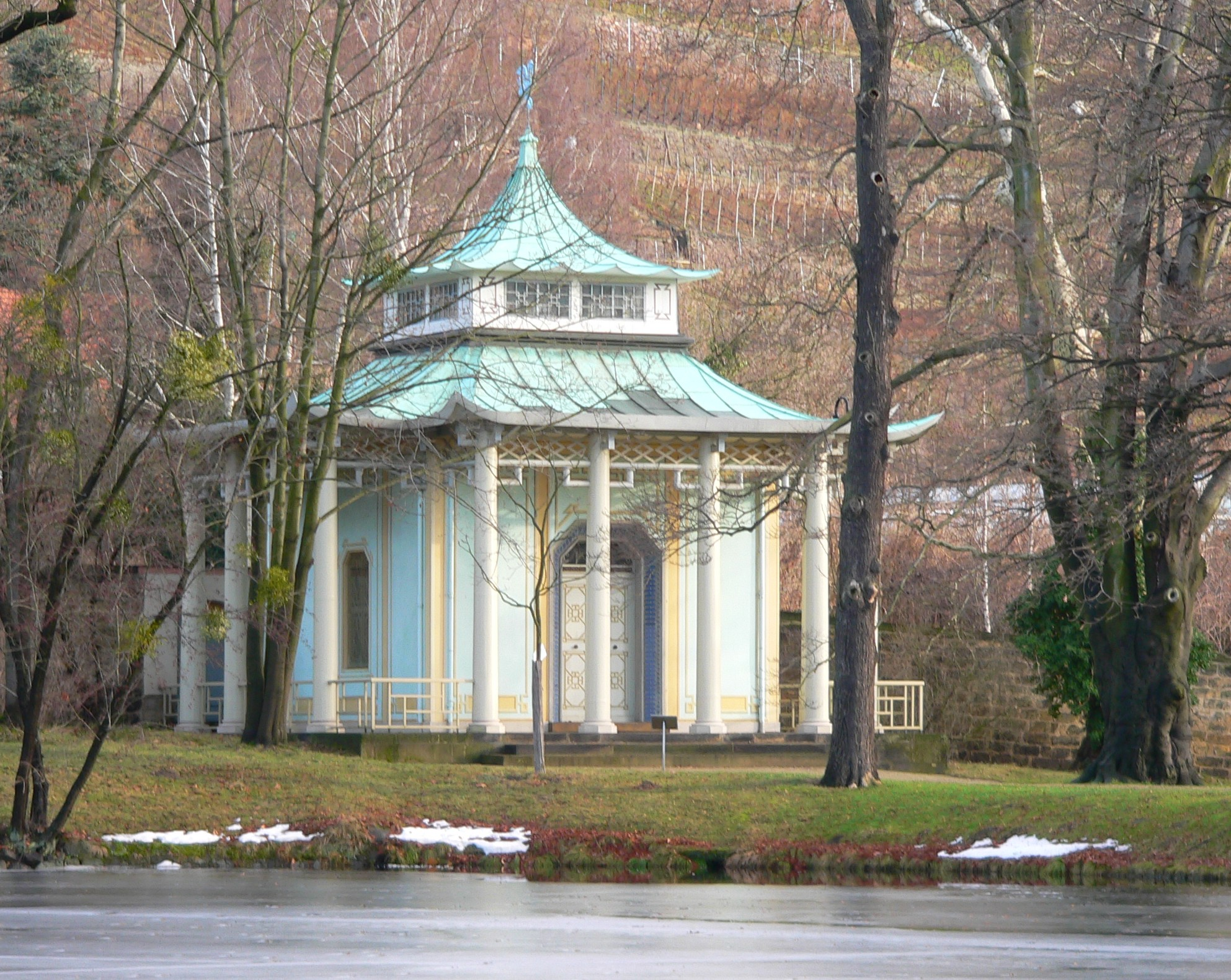
Chinese pavilion

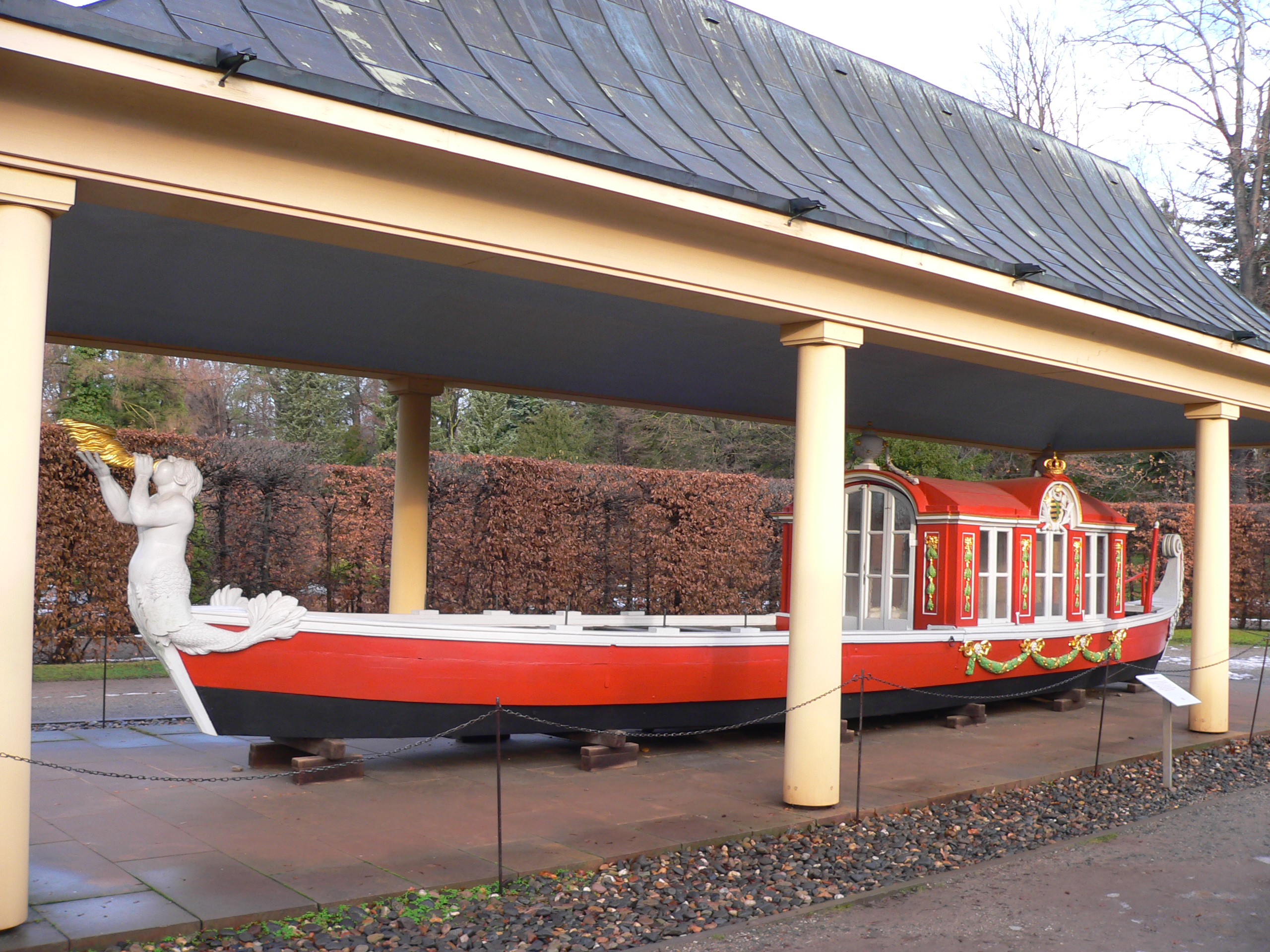
Royal gondola

== Surroundings ==
Schloss Pillnitz is also harmoniously integrated with the natural setting of the Elbe valley and the surrounding hills and vineyards.

In 1723, Augustus II the Strong asked his architect, Matthäus Daniel Pöppelmann, to build the country Church of the Holy Spirit in the east. Due to its location in the middle of vineyards, it is also known as the Vineyard church (Weinbergkirche).

Around 1780, the valley to the northeast, called Friedrichsgrund (Frederick valley), was landscaped for Frederick Augustus I to take walks. It features many small stone bridges and other small decorative buildings that can still be seen today from the path to the former watermill, the Meixmühle.

As was fashionable in German interpretations of Baroque and English gardens, in 1785, an artificial ruin was built on a hilltop in the north. Its Gothic Revival architecture was meant to contrast with the Baroque style of the palace, its expression of the fleeting vanity of life with the pleasurable nature of the gardens.

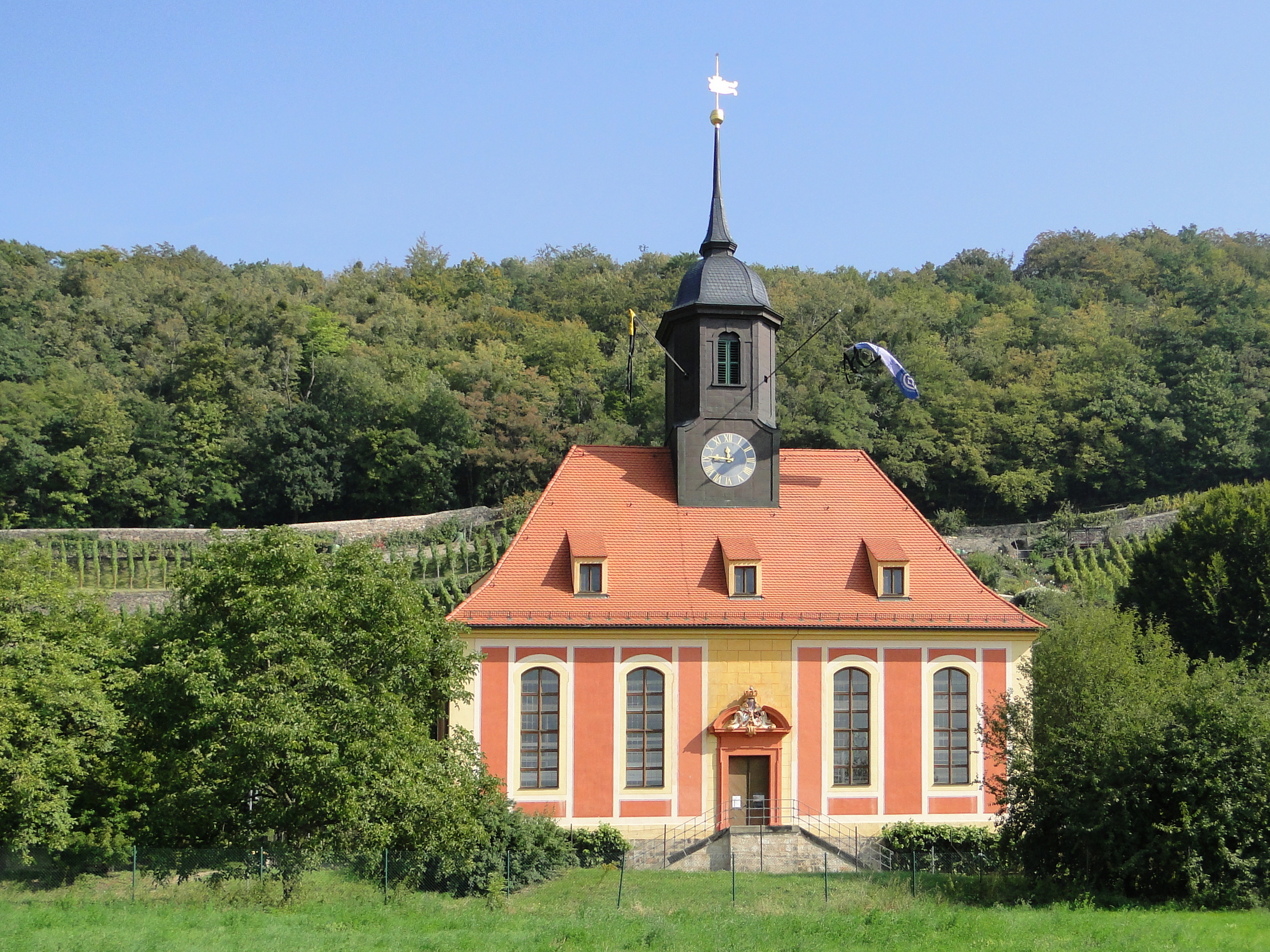
Vineyard church

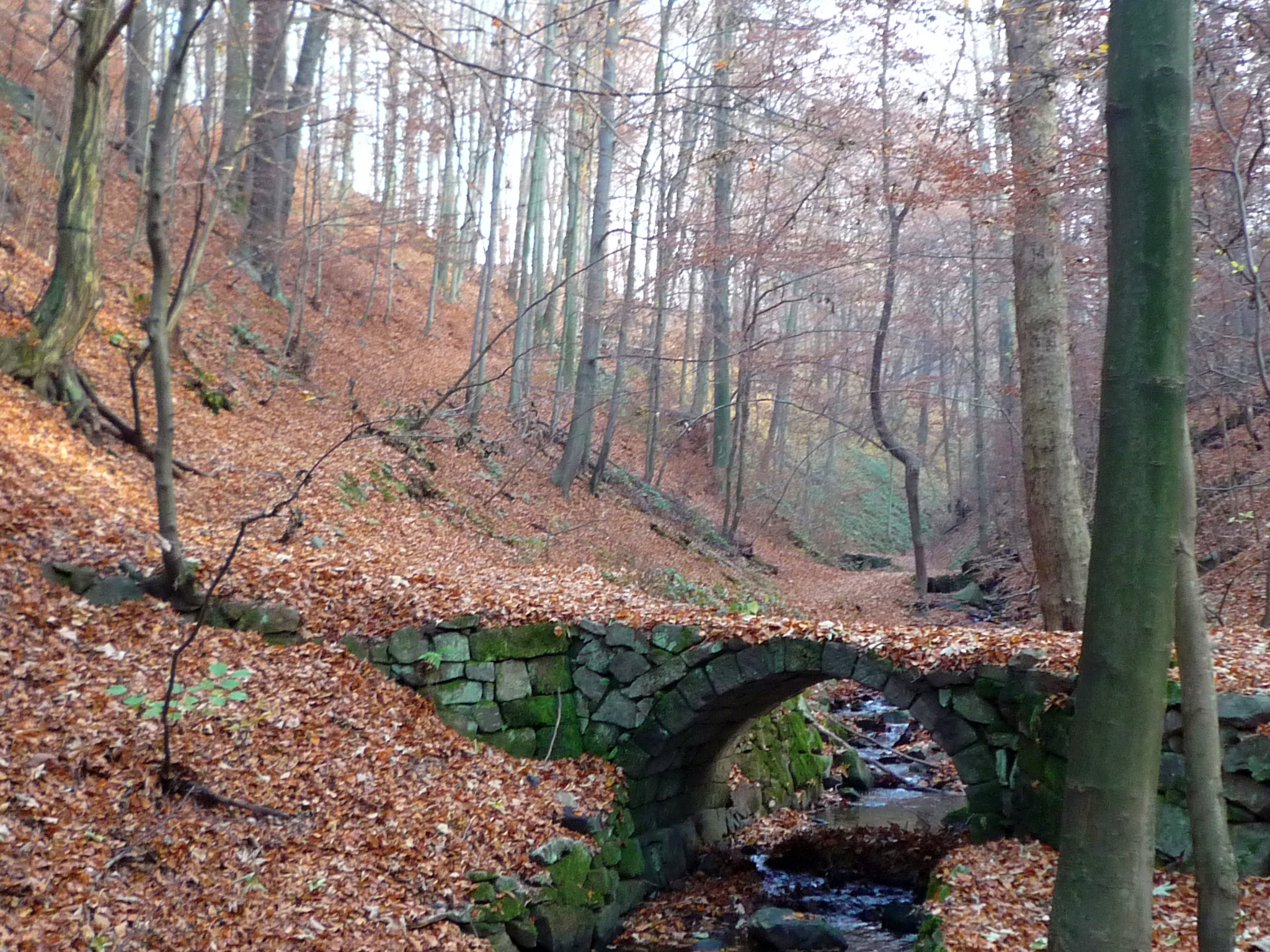
Frederick valley

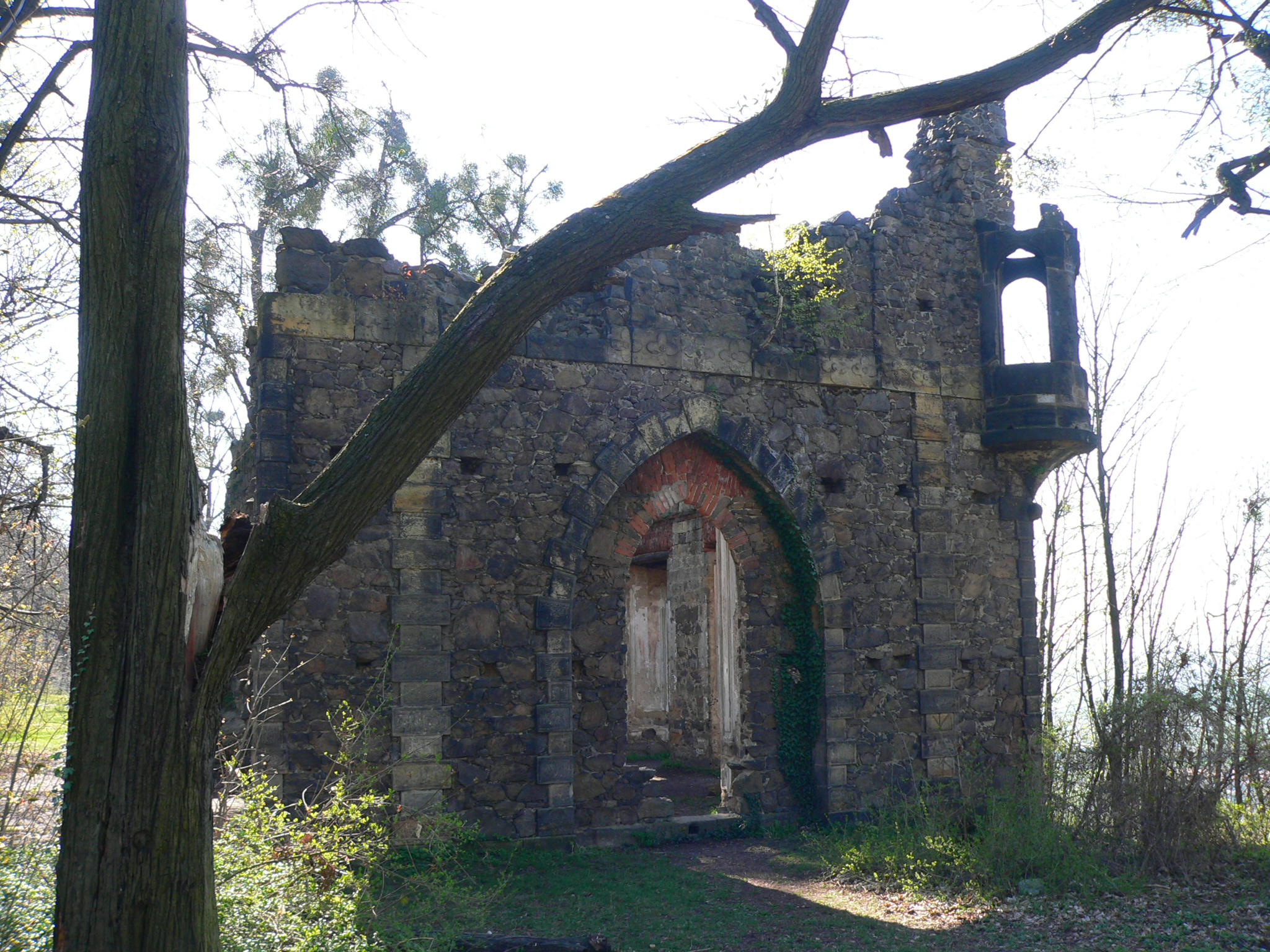
Artificial ruin

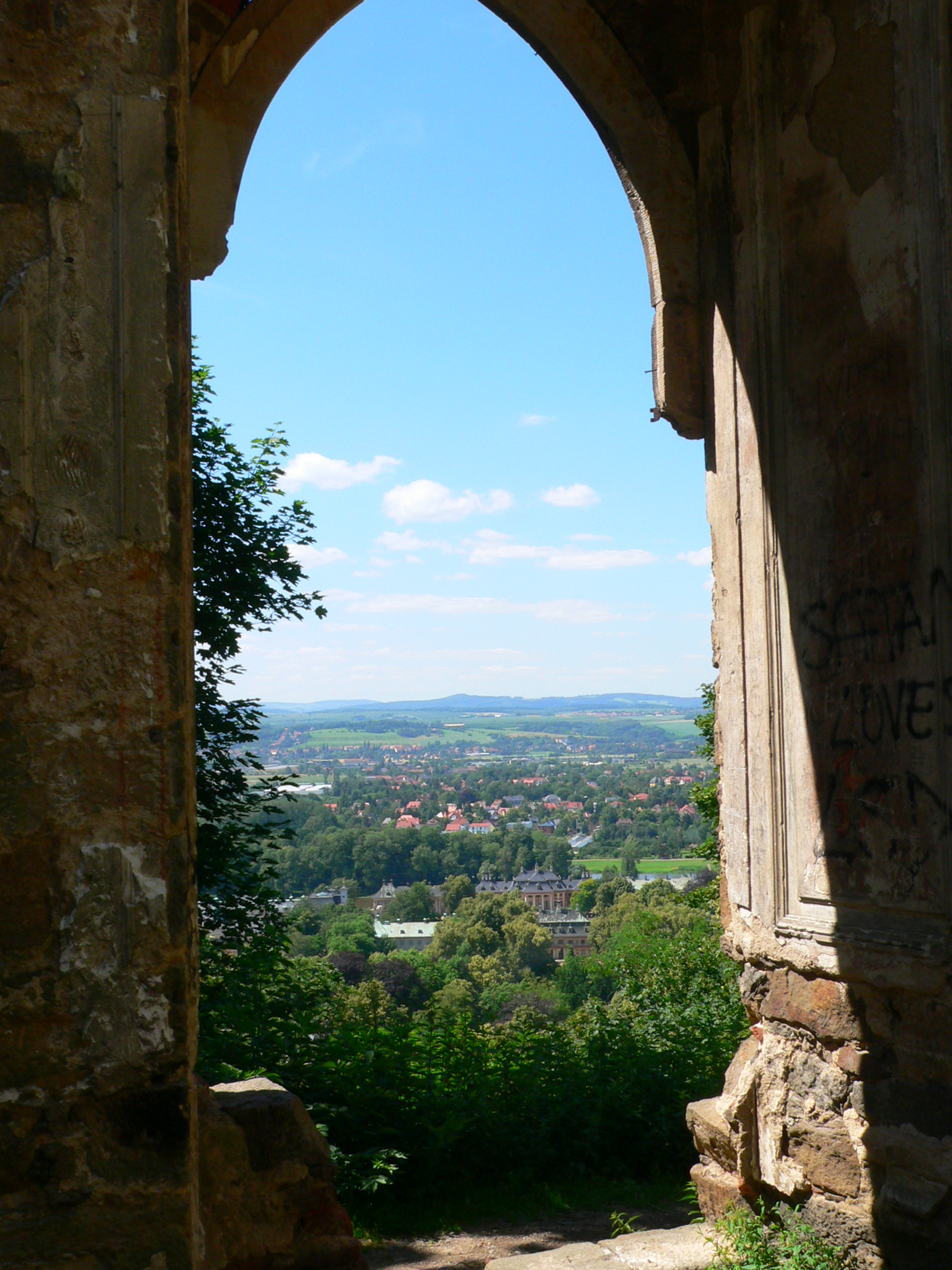
View from the artificial ruin towards Schloss Pillnitz

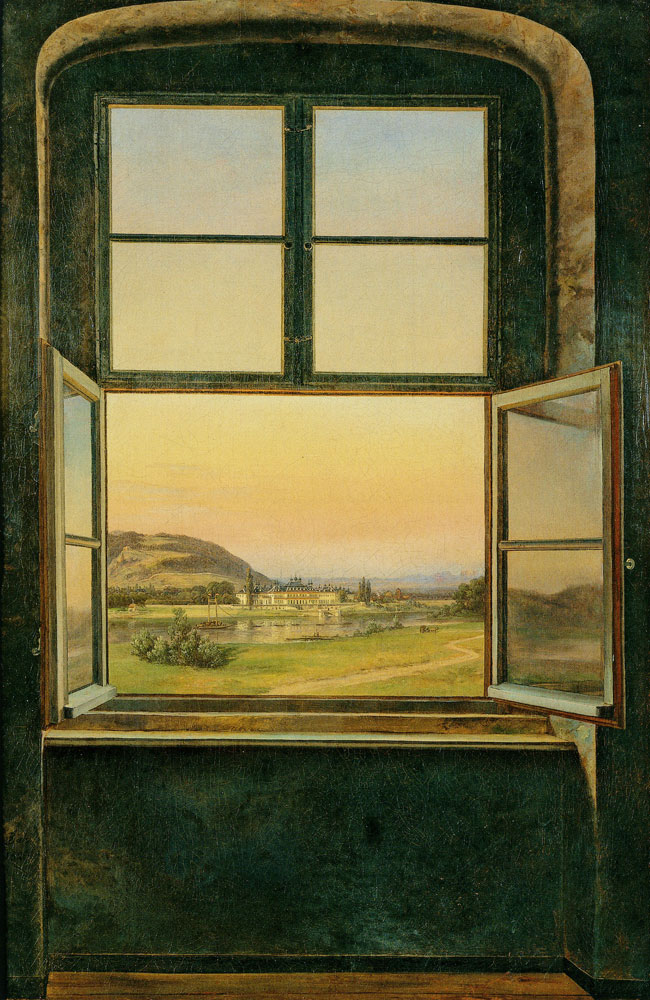
View of Pillnitz Castle by Johan Christian Dahl, 1823
