= Francesco Franchini =

Roman Catholic prelate (died 1559)

Most Reverend Francesco Franchini
- Bishop of Massa Marittima
- Church: Catholic Church
- Diocese: Diocese of Massa Marittima
- In office: 1556–1559
- Predecessor: Miguel da Silva
- Successor: Ventura Buffalini

Personal details
- Died: 1559 Massa Marittima, Italy

Francesco Franchini (died 1559) was a Roman Catholic prelate who served as Bishop of Massa Marittima (1556–1559).

== Biography ==
On 30 Oct 1556, Francesco Franchini was appointed during the papacy of Pope Paul IV as Bishop of Massa Marittima. He served as Bishop of Massa Marittima until he died in 1559.

== External links and additional sources ==
- Cheney, David M. "Diocese of Massa Marittima-Piombino". Catholic-Hierarchy.org. (for Chronology of Bishops) ^{[self-published]}
- Chow, Gabriel. "Diocese of Massa Marittima-Piombino (Italy)". GCatholic.org. (for Chronology of Bishops) ^{[self-published]}

Catholic Church titles
Preceded by Miguel da Silva	Bishop of Massa Marittima; 1556–1559	Succeeded by Ventura Buffalini
