= Federico Cesi (cardinal) =

Italian bishop and cardinal (1500–1565)

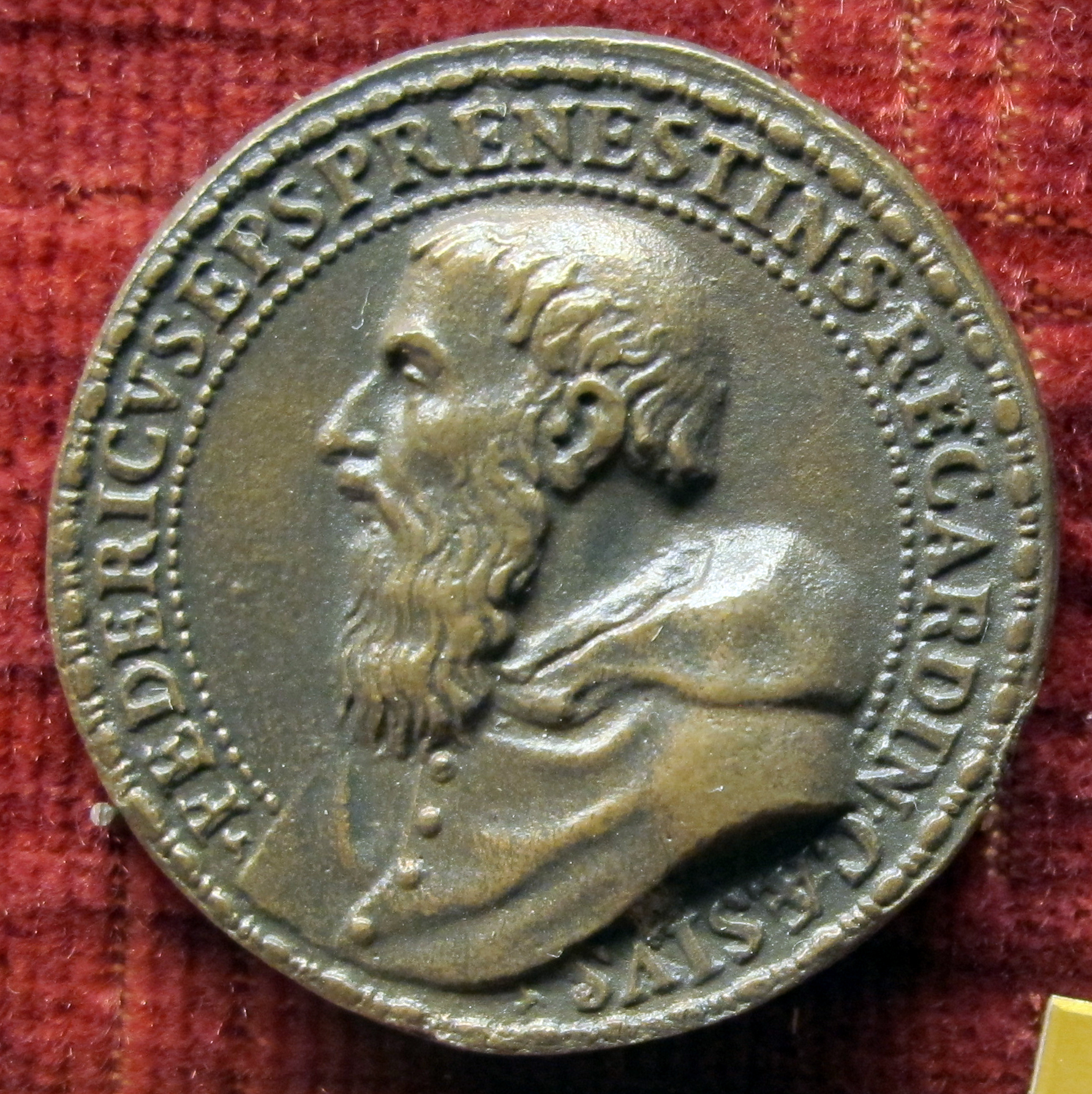
Federico Cesi

Federico Cesi (1 July 1500 — 28 January 1565) was an Italian Roman Catholic bishop and cardinal.

== Biography ==
Federico Cesi was born in Rome on 1 July 1500, the son of Roman noble Angelo Cesi of the House of Cesi and his wife Francesca Cardoli. He was the younger brother of Cardinal Paolo Emilio Cesi.

He studied law at the University of Rome and then practiced law in Rome. He later left legal practice to become a priest.

On 12 June 1523, he was elected Bishop of Todi, with dispensation for not having reached the canonical age. He was consecrated as a bishop in Rome on 25 July 1524 by Paris de Grassis, Bishop of Pesaro. He soon became a member of the Apostolic Camera.

Pope Paul III made him a cardinal priest in the consistory of 19 December 1544. He received the red hat and the titular church of San Pancrazio on 9 July 1545. He resigned the government of the Diocese of Todi on 11 March 1545. From 9 November 1549 to 12 February 1552 he was the administrator of the Diocese of Caserta.

He participated in the papal conclave of 1549-50 that elected Pope Julius III. He opted for the titular church of Santa Prisca on 28 February 1550.

From 15 July 1550 to 14 March 1551 he was the administrator of the Diocese of Vulturaria e Montecorvino. He then administered the Diocese of Cremona from 18 March 1551 until 13 March 1560. He also served as Camerlengo of the Sacred College of Cardinals from 7 January 1555 to 10 January 1556.

He was a participant in both the papal conclave of April 1555 that elected Pope Marcellus II and the papal conclave of May 1555 that elected Pope Paul IV.

On 20 September 1557 he opted for the order of cardinal bishops, receiving the suburbicarian see of Palestrina.

He then participated in the papal conclave of 1559 that elected Pope Pius IV.

He opted for the suburbicarian see of Frascati on 18 May 1562, and then for the suburbicarian see of Porto e Santa Rufina on 12 May 1564. During this period he was Vice-Dean of the College of Cardinals.

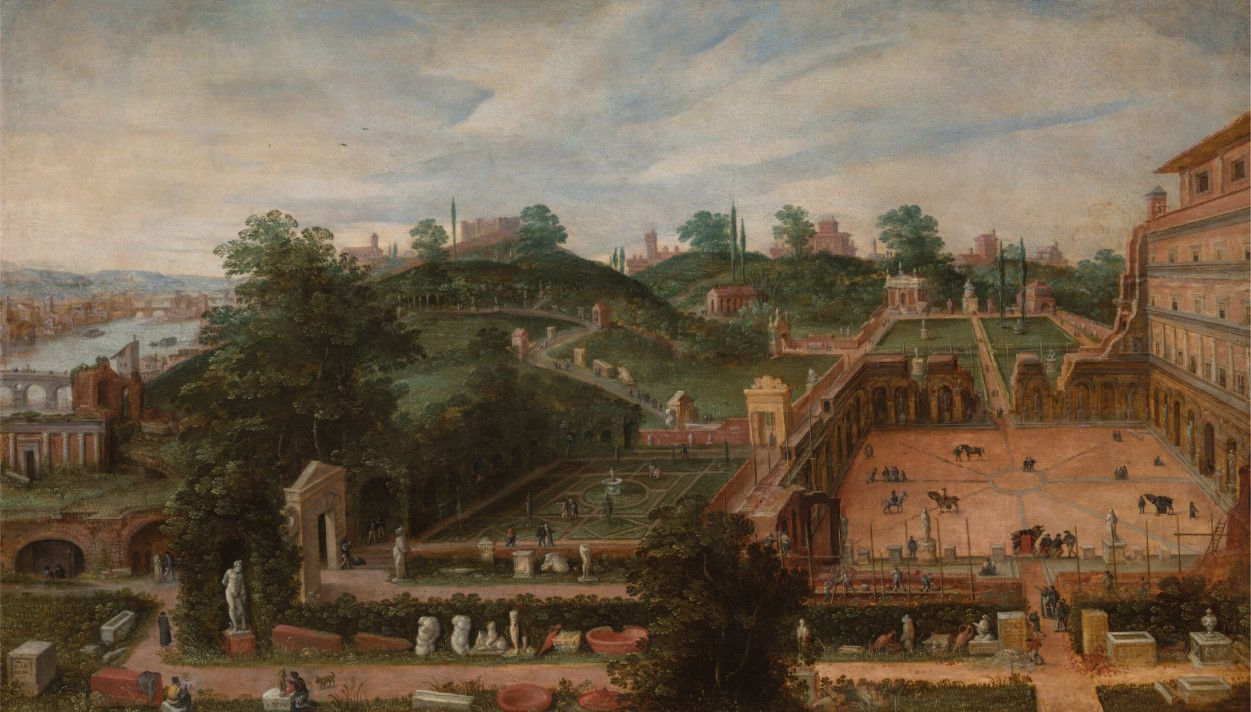
The Sculpture Garden of Cardinal Cesi, by Hendrick van Cleve III (1584)

Cardinal Cesi was friends with Charles Borromeo, Ignatius of Loyola, and Philip Neri. He created one of the most famous gardens in early modern Rome near St. Peter's Basilica. There he exhibited his collection of antiques, a sculpture garden, which is depicted in a painting by Hendrick van Cleve III. In 1622 the collection, which included the famous Juno Ludovisi, was acquired by Cardinal Ludovico Ludovisi.

Cardinal Cesi died in Rome on 28 January 1565. Following a funeral at Santa Caterina dei Funari, he was buried in the Basilica di Santa Maria Maggiore.

Catholic Church titles
Preceded by Paolo Emilio Cesi	Bishop of Todi; 1523–1545	Succeeded by Giovanni Andrea Cesi
Preceded by Gian Pietro Carafa	Cardinal-Priest of San Pancrazio; 1545–1557	Succeeded by Juan Álvarez de Toledo
Preceded by Giovanni Andrea Cesi	Administrator of Cervia; 1545	Succeeded by Scipione Santacroce
Preceded by Bernardino Maffei	Administrator of Caserta; 1549–1552	Succeeded by Antonio Bernardi della Mirandola
Preceded by Gerolamo Vecciani	Administrator of Vulturara e Montecorvino; 1550–1551	Succeeded by Leonardo Benzoni
Preceded by Francesco Sfondrati	Administrator of Cremona; 1551–1560	Succeeded by Niccolò Sfondrati
Preceded by Louis de Bourbon de Vendôme	Cardinal-Bishop of Palestrina; 1557–1562	Succeeded by Giovanni Gerolamo Morone
Preceded by Francesco Pisani	Cardinal-Bishop of Frascati; 1562–1564	Succeeded by Giovanni Gerolamo Morone
Preceded by Francesco Pisani	Cardinal-Bishop of Porto e Santa Rufina; 1564–1565	Succeeded by Giovanni Gerolamo Morone
