= Francesco Peroschi =

Italian Roman Catholic prelate

Most Reverend Francesco Peroschi
- Bishop of Massa Marittima
- Church: Catholic Church
- Diocese: Diocese of Massa Marittima
- In office: 1524–1529
- Predecessor: Giovanni Gregorio Peroschi
- Successor: Paolo Emilio Cesi

Francesco Peroschi or Camillus Peroschi was a Roman Catholic prelate who served as Bishop of Massa Marittima (1524–1529).

== Biography ==
On 29 July 1524, Ventura Benassai was appointed during the papacy of Pope Clement VII as Bishop of Massa Marittima. He served as Bishop of Massa Marittima until his resignation in 1529.

== External links and additional sources ==
- Cheney, David M. "Diocese of Massa Marittima-Piombino". Catholic-Hierarchy.org. (for Chronology of Bishops) ^{[self-published]}
- Chow, Gabriel. "Diocese of Massa Marittima-Piombino (Italy)". GCatholic.org. (for Chronology of Bishops) ^{[self-published]}

Catholic Church titles
Preceded by Giovanni Gregorio Peroschi	Bishop of Massa Marittima; 1524–1529	Succeeded by Paolo Emilio Cesi
