= Paolo Emilio Cesi =

Italian cardinal

- Cardinal-Deacon of Sant'Eustachio
- Church: Catholic Church
- In office: 1534–1537
- Predecessor: Alessandro Farnese (cardinal)
- Successor: Agostino Trivulzio

Orders
- Rank: Cardinal-Deacon

Personal details
- Born: 1481 Terni, Umbria
- Died: 5 Aug 1537 (age 56) Rome, Italy

Paolo Emilio Cesi (1481–1537) was an Italian Roman Catholic cardinal.

== Biography ==
Paolo Emilio Cesi was born in Terni, Umbria in 1481, the eldest of twelve children born to Roman noble Angelo Cesi from the house of Cesi and Francesca Cardoli. His younger brother, Federico Cesi, also became a cardinal. After finishing school, he moved to Rome where he served as a notary at the Fifth Council of the Lateran, a canon of Santa Maria Maggiore, a protonotary apostolic, and a regent of the Chancery of Apostolic Briefs.

He was named cardinal deacon by Pope Leo X in the consistory of July 1, 1517. On July 6, 1517, he received the red hat and the deaconry of San Nicola in Carcere. He participated in the papal conclave of 1521-22 that elected Pope Adrian VI. He was the administrator of the see of Lund from February 6, 1520, to July 12, 1521; administrator of the see of Sion from November 12, 1522, until September 8, 1529; and administrator of the see of Todi from June 1, 1523, until he resigned in favor of his brother Federico. Pope Adrian VI named him one of the judges in the case against Cardinal Francesco Soderini. He participated in the papal conclave of 1523 that elected Pope Clement VII. He was administrator of the see of Narni from May 20, 1524, to June 1, 1524; administrator of the see of Civita Castellana from April 7, 1525, until his death; and administrator of the see of Cervia from 1525 until March 23, 1528.

He lost all of his goods during the Sack of Rome (1527).

In the absence of the pope, he was governor of Rome in 1529. From October 6, 1529, until October 21, 1530, he was administrator of the see of Massa Marittima. He opted for the deaconry of Sant'Eustachio on September 5, 1534. Under Pope Clement VII, he was Prefect of the Apostolic Signatura. He was also the cardinal protector of the Duchy of Savoy, and vice-protector of the Kingdom of England and the Kingdom of Ireland. He participated in the papal conclave of 1534 that elected Pope Paul III. On August 23, 1535, the new pope made him a member of the commission on reform of the Roman Curia.

He died in Rome on August 5, 1537. He is buried in the Basilica di Santa Maria Maggiore. While bishop, he was the principal co-consecrator of Cristoforo Numai, Bishop of Isernia.

== See also ==
- Catholic Church in Italy

Catholic Church titles
| Preceded by Carlo Domenico del Carretto | Cardinal-Deacon of San Nicola in Carcere; 1517–1534 | Succeeded by Íñigo López de Mendoza y Zúñiga |
| Preceded by | Administrator of Lund; 1520–1521 | Succeeded by |
| Preceded by Matthäus Schiner | Administrator of Sion; 1522–1529 | Succeeded by Adrian von Riedmatten |
| Preceded by Constantin Eruli | Administrator of Todi; 1523 | Succeeded by Federico Cesi (cardinal) |
| Preceded by Carlo Soderini | Administrator of Narni; 1524 | Succeeded by Bartolomeo Cesi (bishop) |
| Preceded by Pietro de Flisco | Administrator of Cervia; 1525–1528 | Succeeded by Octavio de Cesi |
| Preceded by Francesco Franceschini | Administrator of Civita Castellana e Orte; 1525–1537 | Succeeded by Pomponio Cecci |
| Preceded by Francesco Peroschi | Administrator of Massa Marittima; 1529–1530 | Succeeded by Girolamo Ghianderoni |
| Preceded by Andrea della Valle | Archpriest of the Basilica di Santa Maria Maggiore; 1534–1537 | Succeeded by Alessandro Farnese (cardinal) |
| Preceded by Alessandro Farnese (cardinal) | Cardinal-Deacon of Sant'Eustachio; 1534–1537 | Succeeded by Agostino Trivulzio |
