= Bartolomeo Cesi (bishop) =

16th-century Roman Catholic bishop

Most Reverend Bartolomeo Cesi
- Bishop of Narni
- Church: Catholic Church
- Diocese: Diocese of Narni
- In office: 1524–1537
- Predecessor: Paolo Emilio Cesi
- Successor: Guido Ascanio Sforza di Santa Fiora

Orders
- Consecration: 25 Jul 1524

Personal details
- Died: 1537

Bartolomeo Cesi (died 1537) was a Roman Catholic prelate who served as Bishop of Narni (1524–1537).

== Biography ==
On 1 Jul 1524, Bartolomeo Cesi was appointed during the papacy of Pope Clement VII as Bishop of Narni. On 25 Jul 1524, he was consecrated bishop. He served as Bishop of Narni until his death in 1537.

While bishop, he was the principal consecrator of Paride de Grassis, Bishop of Pesaro (1513).

== External links and additional sources ==
- Cheney, David M. "Diocese of Narni". Catholic-Hierarchy.org. (Chronology of Bishops) ^{[self-published]}
- Chow, Gabriel. "Diocese of Narni (Italy)". GCatholic.org. Archived from the original on February 4, 2014. (Chronology of Bishops) ^{[self-published]}

Catholic Church titles
Preceded by Paolo Emilio Cesi	Bishop of Narni; 1524–1537	Succeeded by Guido Ascanio Sforza di Santa Fiora
