= Christian Friedrich Schuricht =

German architect and painter (1753–1832)

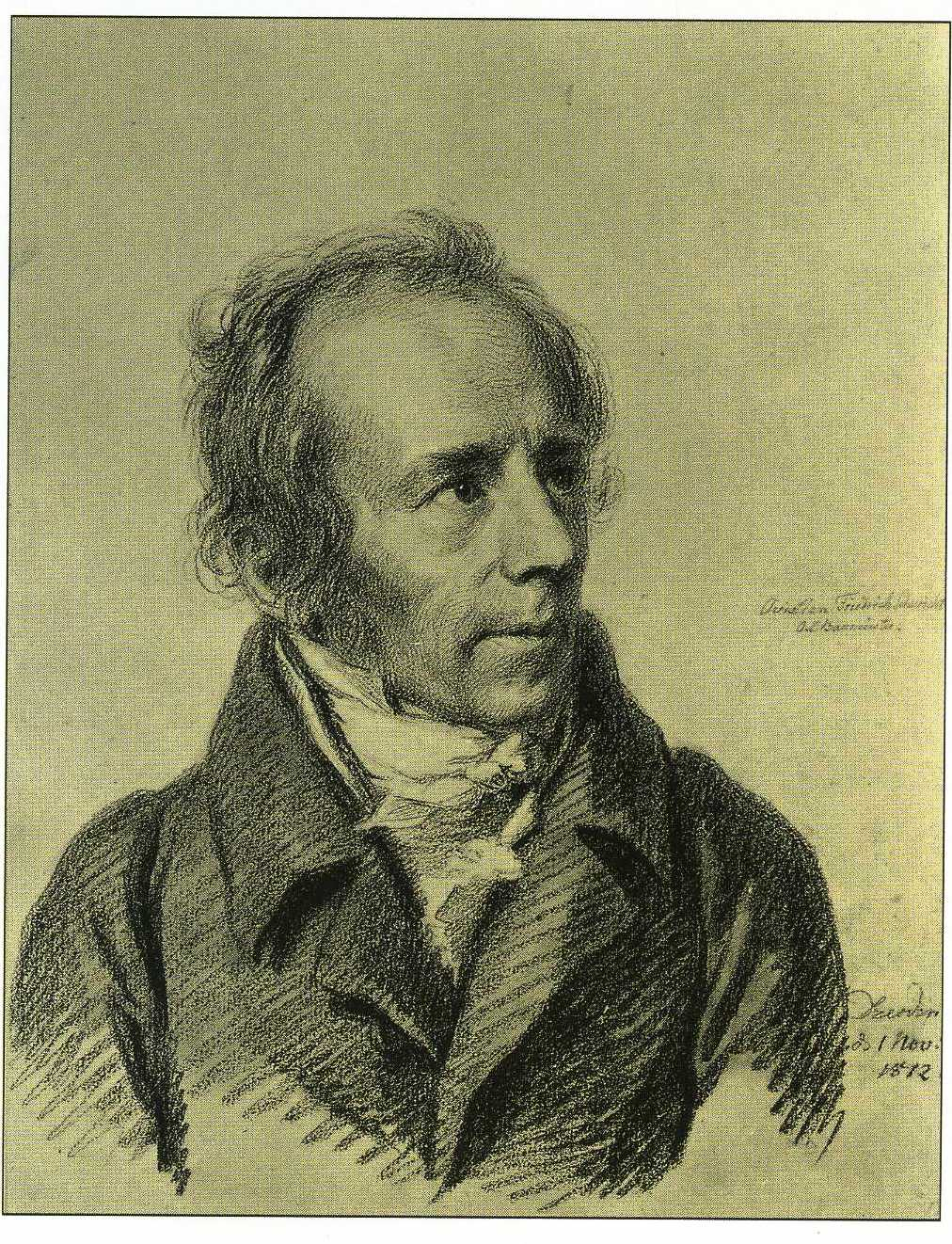
Christian Friedrich Schuricht

Christian Friedrich Schuricht (March 5, 1753 – August 2, 1832) was a German architect and painter who designed, among others, the New Palace and the Chinese garden at Pillnitz Castle.

Schuricht was born in Dresden and a pupil of Friedrich August Krubsacius. He was appointed by Frederick Augustus I of Saxony to become his court architect in 1812. When the Countess' palace at Pillnitz Castle burnt down in 1818, Frederick Augustus I asked him to design a new palace on the same spot. The New Palace (Neues Palais) was finished in 1826. While the building itself is Neoclassical style, its roof follows the original theme of the other buildings at Pillnitz Castle established by the former court architect Matthäus Daniel Pöppelmann in the 1720s.

He is commemorated by street names Schurichstrasse in Dresden and Munich.
