= Diocese of Massa Marittima-Piombino =

Roman Catholic diocese in Italy

Coordinates: 43.0495°N 10.8881°E

Diocese of Massa Marittima-Piombino Dioecesis Massana-Plumbinensis

Catholic
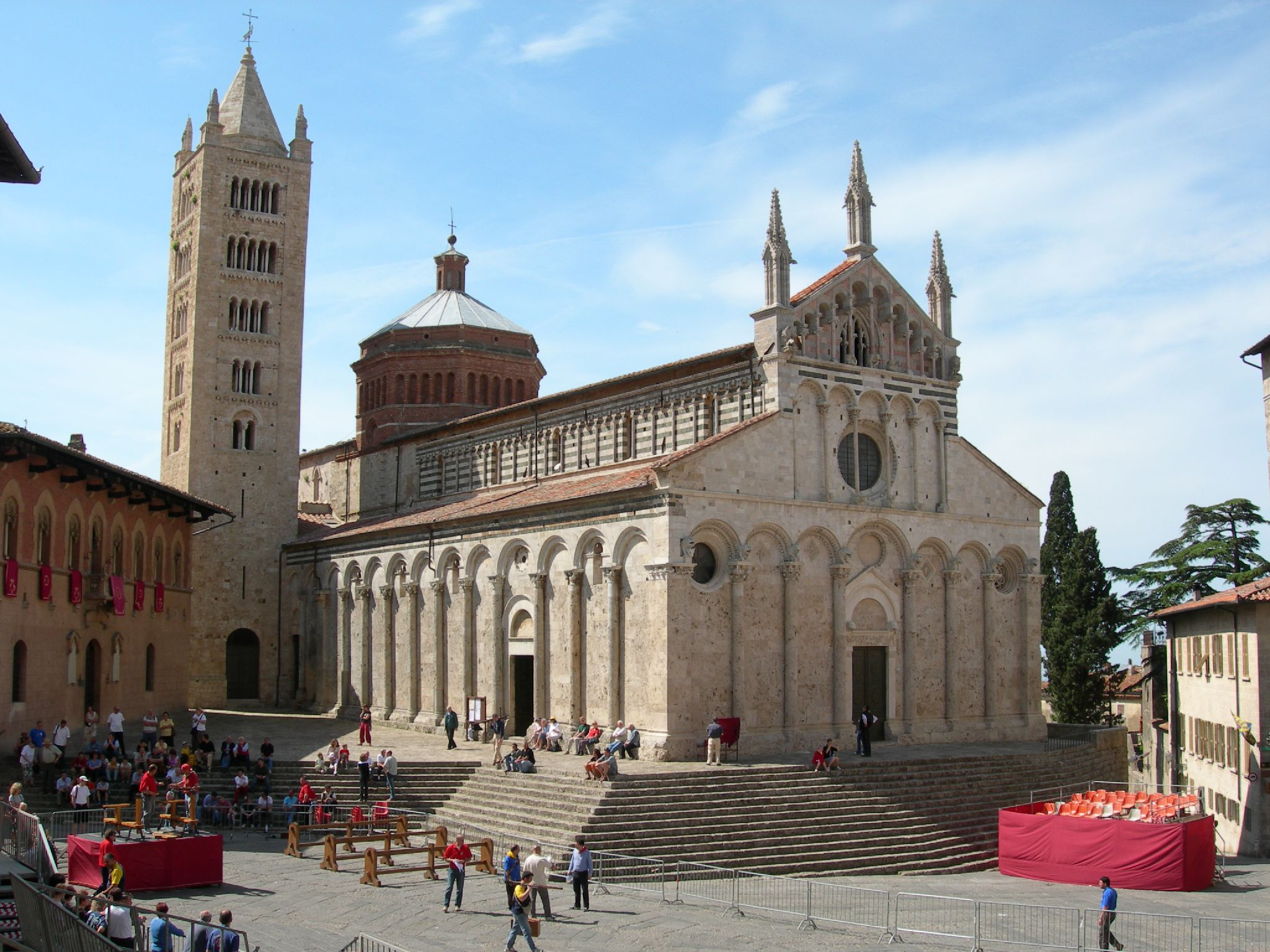
- Massa Marittima Cathedral

Location
- Country: Italy
- Ecclesiastical province: Siena-Colle di Val d'Elsa-Montalcino

Statistics
- Area: 1,200 km^{2} (460 sq mi)
- Population: Total; Catholics: (as of 2021); 126,700 (est.); 124,750 (guess)
- Parishes: 53

Information
- Denomination: Catholic Church
- Rite: Roman Rite
- Established: 5th century
- Cathedral: Basilica Cattedrale di Cerbone Vescovo (Massa Marittima)
- Co-cathedral: Chiesa Abbaziale di S. Antimo Martire (Piombino)
- Secular priests: 35 (diocesan); 12 (Religious Orders); 4 Permanent Deacons

Current leadership
- Pope: Leo XIV
- Bishop: Carlo Ciattini

Map

Website
- www.diocesimassamarittima.it

The Diocese of Massa Marittima-Piombino (Latin: Dioecesis Massana-Plumbinensis) is a Latin Church diocese of the Catholic Church in Tuscany, central Italy. It was known as Diocese of Massa Marittima before 1978. Up until 1458, it was a suffragan of the archdiocese of Pisa; since 1458, it has been a suffragan of the Archdiocese of Siena. The territory of the diocese includes the islands of Elba and Pianosa, and (up to 1817) Capraia.

== History ==
Massa Marittima was first mentioned in the eighth century. It grew at the expense of Populonia, an ancient city of the Etruscans. Populonia was besieged by Sulla, and in Strabo's time was already declining; later it suffered at the hands of Totila, King of the Lombards, and in 817 of a Byzantine fleet. After this, the bishops of Populonia abandoned the town, which was destroyed in the 9th century, and moved their seat to Castrum Corniae. In the eleventh century, the bishops established their residence at Massa, though continuing to call themselves bishops of Populonia. Bishop Martinus (1181–1196) is the first to be called Bishop of Populonia e Massa.

On 22 April 1138, Populonia was made a suffragan of Pisa by Pope Innocent II, who had once been living in exile in Pisa; the bull stated that the grant was a compensation for Pisa's loss of the overlordship of the bishops of Corsica earlier in the century. Before 1138, Populonia had been directly subject to the Holy See (Papacy), and attended the Roman synods.

In 1226 Massa became a commune under the protection of Pisa. In 1307 it made an alliance with Siena, which was the cause of many wars between the two republics.

On 22 April 1459, Pope Pius II issued the bull "Triumphans Pastor", in which he raised the diocese of Siena to metropolitan status, and assigned to it as suffragans the dioceses of Soano, Chiusi, Massa, and Grosseto.

The Second Vatican Council (1962–1965), in order to ensure that all Catholics received proper spiritual attention, decreed the reorganization of the diocesan structure of Italy and the consolidation of small and struggling dioceses. It also recommended the abolition of anomalous units such as exempt territorial prelatures. This applied to Populonia, which had a tiny population but was part of the name of the diocese, while the much larger city of Piombino, which was a civil administrative center, had no recognition. On 14 May 1978, at the instruction of Pope Paul VI, the name "Populonia" was removed from the name of the diocese, and the name "Piombino" substituted. The name "Populonia", however, was preserved as the name of a new titular diocese.

The first known Bishop of Populonia was Atellus, or Asellus (about 495). Among the bishops of Massa were Antonio da Massa Marittima (1430), a former minister general of the Franciscans, and legate of Pope Boniface IX; Leonardo Dati (1467), author of poetic satires. Massa Marittima's most famous native son was Saint Bernardino (of Siena) (1380–1444), whose father was the governor of Massa at the time of Bernardino's birth.

=== Chapter and cathedral ===
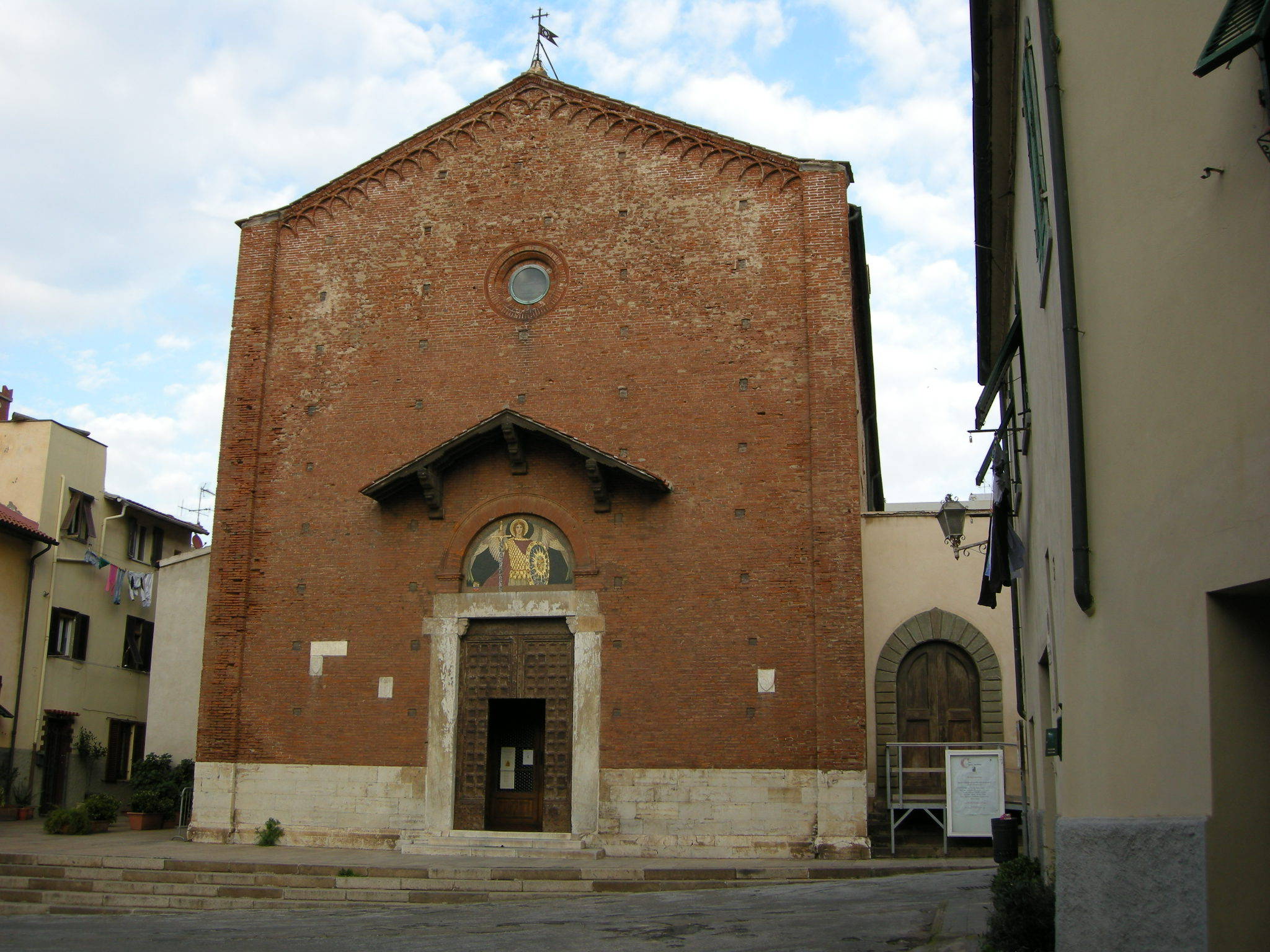
Co-cathedral of Sant'Antimo in Piombino

The cathedral of Massa, begun in the first years of the 11th century, is dedicated to Saint Cerbonius, one of its earliest bishops, who was named protector of the city. The cathedral is also a parish church. Its earliest construction is Romanesque, but, beginning in 1287, it was extended under the supervision of Giovanni Pisano. The present cathedral structure was consecrated by Bishop Vincenzo Casali (1585– 1587) on 23 March 1586.

The cathedral is served and administered by a Chapter, composed of two dignities (the Archpriest and the Provost) and ten Canons. In 1679, there were only six Canons. In 1770 there were eight Canons. Since the cathedral has parishioners, the Archpriest is responsible for their spiritual care.

The co-cathedral in Piombino, once the convent of the Augustinian monks, was built through the generosity of the Lord of Piombino, Jacopo d'Appiano, between 1374 and 1377. The Augustinians were ejected in 1806, under the regulations of the French occupation, and S. Antimo was severely damaged. The co-cathedral is dedicated to Saint Antimo.

=== Synods ===
A diocesan synod was an irregularly held, but important, meeting of the bishop of a diocese and his clergy. Its purpose was (1) to proclaim generally the various decrees already issued by the bishop; (2) to discuss and ratify measures on which the bishop chose to consult with his clergy; (3) to publish statutes and decrees of the diocesan synod, of the provincial synod, and of the Holy See.

Bishop Nicolaus Beruti, O.P. (1394–1404) held a diocesan synod on 20 May 1396, at which, having considered the effects of the wars and famine, it was decided to reduce the decima (tithe). A diocesan synod was held by Bishop Vincenzo Casali (1585–1587) on 10–11 April 1586.

On 18–20 April 1723, Bishop Eusebio Ciani (1719–1770) presided over a diocesan synod, held in the cathedral at Massa. He held another synod in 1746, at which the parish priest of the island of Capraia was raised to the dignity of archpriest.

Bishop Giovanni Battista Boracchia (1892–1924) held a diocesan synod in Massa on 11–13 October 1921.

== Bishops of Massa Marittima ==
=== Bishops of Populonia ===
==== to 1200 ====
...

- Asellus (attested 495, 501)

...
[Florentius (6th cent.)]

- Cerbonius (attested 546-547)

...
[Maximinus]
...

- Sede vacante (591)

...

- Wido (Guido) (attested 979)

...

- Henricus (attested 1015, 1036, 1050)
- Tegrino (attested 1057–1061)
- Bernardus (attested 1065, 1068)
- Wilelmus (attested 1074, 1080)

Wilelmus (attested 1082)

- Joannes (attested 1099)
- Laurentius (attested 1103)
- Rolandus (attested 1112, 1126, 1138)

...

- Albertus (attested 1149)

...

- Martinus (1181–1196)

...

==== 1200 to 1500 ====
...

- Marsuccus Gaetani (attested 1211–1213)
- Albertus (attested 1217)

[Guglielmo (1231)]

- Hldebrandus (attested 1231–1236)
- Nicolaus (attested 1254)
- Ruggierus Ugurgeri (attested 1256–1268)
- Philippus (1268–1278?)
- Rotlandus Ugurgeri (attested 1278–1300)
- Lando (attested 1307)
- Christophorus Tolomei, O.P. (1310–1313?)
- Joannes (1313–1332)
- Galganus de Pagliarecci, O.P. (1332–1348?)
- Guido (1349–1361?)
- Antonio di Riparia (1361–1380)
- Pietro da Fano, O.E.S.A. (1380–1389) Roman Obedience
- Nicolaus da Salerno, O.Min. (1385– ? ) Avignon Obedience
- Andrea Galeazzi, O.Min. (1389–1390) Roman Obedience
- Giovanni Gabrielli (1390–1394) Roman Obedience
- Nicolaus Beruti, O.P. (1394–1404) Roman Obedience
- Bartolomeo Ghini (1404–1425) Roman Obedience
- Antonius Francisci (1425–1430)
- Antonius da Massa, O.Min. (1430–1435)
- Richardus del Frate, O.S.B.Vallamb. (1435–1438)
- Pietro Dell'Orto (6 Mar 1439 – 1467)
- Leonardo Dati (1467–1472)
- Bartolomeo della Rovere, O.F.M. (1472–1474)
- Giovanni Gianderoni, O.S.A. (1475–1483)
- Gerolamo Conti (1483–1500)

==== 1500 to 1800 ====
- Ventura Benassai (1501–1511)
- Alfonso Petrucci (1511 – 22 Jun 1517 Resigned)
- Giovanni Gregorio Peroschi (16 Jul 1517 – 1524)
- Francesco Peroschi (29 Jul 1524 – 1529 Resigned)

Cardinal Paolo Emilio Cesi (1529–1530) Administrator

- Girolamo Ghianderoni (1530–1538)

Alessandro Farnese (iuniore) (1538–1547) Administrator

- Bernardino Maffei (1547–1549) Bishop-elect
- Cardinal Miguel da Silva (1549–1556)
- Francesco Franchini (30 Oct 1556 – 1559)
- Ventura Bufalini (13 Mar 1560 – 1570)
- Antonio de Angelis (23 Aug 1570 – 1579)
- Alberto Bolognetti (27 Apr 1579 – 17 May 1585)
- Vincenzo Casali (1 Jul 1585 – 1587 Resigned)
- Achille Sergardi (28 Sep 1587 – 1601)
- Alessandro Petrucci (1602–1615)
- Fabio Piccolomini (1615–1629)
- Giovanni Battista Malaspina (17 Sep 1629 – 16 Oct 1655)
- Bandino Accarigi (3 Mar 1656 – Aug 1670)
- Niccolò Della Ciaia (20 Apr 1671 – Aug 1679)
- Paolo Pecci (27 Nov 1679 – Oct 1694)
- Pietro Luigi Malaspina, C.R. (2 May 1695 – Dec 1705 Died)
- Ascanio Silvestri (17 May 1706 –1714)
- Niccolò Tolomei (21 Jan 1715 – May 1718)
- Eusebio Ciani, O.S.B. (2 Oct 1719 – 2 Feb 1770)
- Pietro Maria Vannucci (12 Dec 1770 – 7 Aug 1793)

Sede vacante (1793-1795)

- Francesco Toli (22 Sep 1795 –1803)

==== since 1800 ====
Sede vacante (1803–1818)

- Giuseppe Mancini (1818 –1824)
- Giuseppe Traversi (1825–1872)
- Giuseppe Morteo, O.F.M. Cap. (23 Dec 1872 – 21 Nov 1891)
- Giovanni Battista Boracchia (11 Jul 1892 – 24 Apr 1924 Died)
- Giovanni Piccioni (18 Dec 1924 – 1933 Resigned)
- Faustino Baldini (8 Aug 1933 – 20 May 1966 Died)
- Lorenzo Vivaldo (7 Sep 1970 – 13 Mar 1990 Died)

=== Bishops of Massa Marittima-Piombino ===
Name Changed: 14 May 1978

- Angelo Comastri (25 Jul 1990 – 3 Mar 1994 Resigned)
- Gualtiero Bassetti (9 Jul 1994 – 21 Nov 1998 Appointed, Bishop of Arezzo-Cortona-Sansepolcro)
- Giovanni Santucci (28 Oct 1999 – 19 May 2010 Appointed, Bishop of Massa Carrara-Pontremoli)
- Carlo Ciattini (15 Dec 2010 – )

=== Auxiliary bishops ===
- Rodrigo Vázquez (18 Feb 1551 – 1562?)

== Books ==
- Gams, Pius Bonifatius (1873). Series episcoporum Ecclesiae catholicae: quotquot innotuerunt a beato Petro apostolo. Ratisbon: Typis et Sumptibus Georgii Josephi Manz. pp. 756–757. (Use with caution; obsolete)
- Eubel, Conradus, ed. (1913). Hierarchia catholica (in Latin). Vol. Tomus 1 (second ed.). Münster: Libreria Regensbergiana.
- Eubel, Conradus, ed. (1914). Hierarchia catholica (in Latin). Vol. Tomus 2 (second ed.). Münster: Libreria Regensbergiana.
- Eubel, Conradus; Gulik, Guilelmus (1923). Hierarchia catholica (in Latin). Vol. Tomus 3 (second ed.). Münster: Libreria Regensbergiana.
- Gauchat, Patritius (Patrice) (1935). Hierarchia catholica (in Latin). Vol. Tomus IV (1592-1667). Münster: Libraria Regensbergiana.
- Ritzler, Remigius; Sefrin, Pirminus (1952). Hierarchia catholica medii et recentis aevi (in Latin). Vol. Tomus V (1667-1730). Patavii: Messagero di S. Antonio.
- Ritzler, Remigius; Sefrin, Pirminus (1958). Hierarchia catholica medii et recentis aevi. Vol. Tomus VI (1730-1799). Patavii: Messagero di S. Antonio.
- Ritzler, Remigius; Sefrin, Pirminus (1968). Hierarchia Catholica medii et recentioris aevi (in Latin). Vol. VII (1800–1846). Monasterii: Libreria Regensburgiana.
- Remigius Ritzler; Pirminus Sefrin (1978). Hierarchia catholica Medii et recentioris aevi (in Latin). Vol. VIII (1846–1903). Il Messaggero di S. Antonio.
- Pięta, Zenon (2002). Hierarchia catholica medii et recentioris aevi (in Latin). Vol. IX (1903–1922). Padua: Messagero di San Antonio. ISBN 978-88-250-1000-8.

=== Studies ===
- Antonio Canestrelli, Antonio (1910). L'Abbazia di Sant'Antimo. Monografia storico-artistica, con documenti e illustrazioni. Siena: Rivista Siena Monumentale Editrice, 1910–1912. (in Italian)
- Cappelletti, Giuseppe (1862). Le chiese d'Italia dalla loro origine sino ai nostri giorni (in Italian). Vol. decimosettimo. Venezia: Antonelli. pp. 679–726.
- Cesaretti, Agostino (1784). Memorie sacre e profane dell'antica diocesi di Populonia, al presente diocesi di Massa Marittima (in Italian). Vol. Tomo Primo, parte prima. Firenze: stamperia di Giuseppe Tofani.
- Galli, Stefano (1871). Comparini, Olinto (ed.). Memorie storiche di Massa Marittima (in Italian). Vol. Parte prima. Massa Maritima: Tip. A. Dionigi. Parte seconda. 1873. (1873).
- Garzella, Gabriella (1991). "Cronotassi dei vescovi di Populonia-Massa Marittima dalle origini all'inizio del secolo XIII," in Pisa e la Toscana occidentale nel Medioevo. A Cinzio Volante nei suoi 70 anni (Pisa 1991), vol. I, pp. 1–21. (in Italian)
- Greco, Gaetano (1994). "I vescovi del Granducato di Toscana nell'età medicea". In: Istituzioni e società in Toscana nell'età moderna. Rome 1994. pp. 655–680. (in Italian)
- Kehr, Paul Fridolin (1908). Italia pontificia. vol. III. Berlin 1908. pp. 268–278. (in Latin)
- Lanzoni, Francesco (1927). Le diocesi d'Italia dalle origini al principio del secolo VII (an. 604). Faenza: F. Lega. pp. 554–558.(in Italian)
- Petrocchi, Luigi (1900). Massa Marittima: arte e storia (in Italian). Firenze: Arturo Venturi.
- Schwartz, Gerhard (1913), Die Besetzung der Bistümer Reichsitaliens unter den sächsischen und salischen Kaisern : mit den Listen der Bischöfe, 951-1122, Leipzig-Berlin 1913, p. 260-262. (in German)
- Ughelli, Ferdinando; Coleti, Nicolo (1718). Italia sacra sive de Episcopis Italiae, et insularum adjacentium (in Latin). Vol. Tomus tertius (secunda ed.). Venice: Apud Sebastianum Coleti. pp. 701–732.
