= Carlo Ciattini =

Roman Catholic Bishop

His Excellency Carlo Ciattini
- Church: Roman Catholic Church
- See: Massa Marittima-Piombino
- Appointed: 15 December 2010

Personal details
- Born: 20 March 1951 (age 75) Cerreto Guidi, Province of Florence, Italy
- Coat of arms

Carlo Ciattini (born 20 March 1951) is an Italian Roman Catholic bishop. Since 15 December 2010, he has served as bishop of Massa Marittima-Piombino.
