= Girolamo Conti =

16th-century Roman Catholic bishop

Most Reverend Girolamo Conti
- Bishop of Massa Marittima
- Church: Catholic Church
- Diocese: Diocese of Massa Marittima
- In office: 1483–1501
- Predecessor: Giovanni Gianderoni
- Successor: Ventura Benassai

Personal details
- Died: 1501

Girolamo Conti or Girolamo de Comitibus (died 1501) was a Roman Catholic prelate who served as Bishop of Massa Marittima (1483–1501).

== Biography ==
On 10 Sep 1483, he was appointed during the papacy of Pope Sixtus IV as Bishop of Massa Marittima. He served as Bishop of Massa Marittima until his death in 1501.

== External links and additional sources ==
- Cheney, David M. "Diocese of Massa Marittima-Piombino". Catholic-Hierarchy.org. (for Chronology of Bishops) ^{[self-published]}
- Chow, Gabriel. "Diocese of Massa Marittima-Piombino (Italy)". GCatholic.org. (for Chronology of Bishops) ^{[self-published]}

Catholic Church titles
Preceded by Giovanni Gianderoni	Bishop of Massa Marittima; 1483–1501	Succeeded by Ventura Benassai
