= Ventura Benassai =

Italian Roman Catholic prelate

Most Reverend Ventura Benassai
- Bishop of Massa Marittima
- Church: Catholic Church
- Diocese: Diocese of Massa Marittima
- In office: 1501–1511
- Predecessor: Girolamo Conti
- Successor: Alfonso Petrucci

Personal details
- Died: 1511 Massa Marittima, Italy

Ventura Benassai (died 1511) was a Roman Catholic prelate who served as Bishop of Massa Marittima (1501–1511).

== Biography ==
Ventura Benassai was a native of Siena. He had a brother, Latino Benassai. His sister Margherita had been married to Luzio Bellanti.

Benassai began his career at the Papal Court as an agent for the Sienese banking firm of Spannocchi. He purchased the office of Cleric of the Apostolic Chamber for 5,600 ducats. By 5 July 1499, he was also scriptor apostolicarum litterarum.

On 6 October 1501, Ventura Benassai was appointed Bishop of Massa Marittima by Pope Alexander VI. Giovanni Burchard, the papal Master of Ceremonies, noted that he had paid Pope Alexander 7,000 ducats for the diocese. He enjoyed the post of Bishop of Massa Marittima until his death in 1511.

He was a regular member of the papal suite. He traveled with Pope Alexander in his trip to Cerveteri, Corneto, and Piombino in February 1502. On 13 September 1502, Benassai was in Camerino as part of the suite of Cardinal Francesco Borgia, who had been sent to put into operation Alexander VI's bull granting Camerino to his son, Juan Borgia, and elevating the territory to the status of a duchy.

On 2 June 1503 he was named Treasurer General of the Holy Roman Church, the third highest office in the Apostolic Camera, by Alexander VI.

Pope Alexander VI died on 18 August 1503. During the laying-in-state, according to Giovanni Burchard, the Bishop of Massa engaged in minor theft of some of the ornaments. During the Sede vacante following the death of the Pope, the College of Cardinals elected Ventura Benassai to be the Sacristan. He held the office less than a year, being forced to resign by Pope Julius II.

In the spring of 1504, Benassai found himself in trouble. He was accused of having forged a breve of Pope Pius III. He was imprisoned until 5 November, and then only released when he resigned all of his offices. Julius II imposed a fine of 8,000 ducats on him. The Master of Ceremonies, Burchard, remarks that there were a number of other frauds which were unknown to him at the time.

On 1 June 1511, Ventura was at Pavia, having recently spent a day in Milan. He wrote to Aldo Pio Manutio in Rome, mentioning their mutual Milanese friend, Giacomo Antiquario.

He died in Massa, in 1511.

== Sources ==
- Burchard, Johann (Giovanni) (1884). Louis Thuasne (ed.). Johannis Burchardi Argentinensis capelle pontificie sacrorum rituum magistri diarium: sive Rerum urbanarum commentarii (1483-1506) (in Latin and French). Vol. Tome second. Paris: E. Leroux. pp. 427, 544.
- Burchard, Johann (Giovanni) (1885). Louis Thuasne (ed.). Diarium: sive Rerum urbanarum commentarii (1483-1506) (in Latin). Vol. Tome troisième. Paris: E. Leroux. pp. 164, 192, 258, 269, 278, 288, 295, 297, 299, 323–324, 326, 341–342, 370.
- Cesaretti, Agostino (1784). Memorie sacre e profane dell'antica diocesi di Populonia, al presente diocesi di Massa Marittima (in Italian). Vol. Tomo Primo, parte prima. Firenze: stamperia di Giuseppe Tofani. pp. 61–62.
- Piccolomini, Paolo (1903). La "famiglia" de Pio III. Archivio della R. Societa romana di storia patria. Vol. XXVI. Roma: R. Societá romana di storia patria. pp. 146–164 [1–24].
- Ughelli, Ferdinando; Coleti, Nicolo (1718). Italia sacra sive de Episcopis Italiae, et insularum adjacentium (in Latin). Vol. Tomus tertius (secunda ed.). Venice: Apud Sebastianum Coleti. pp. 725–726.

Catholic Church titles
Preceded by Girolamo Conti	Bishop of Massa Marittima; 1501–1511	Succeeded by Alfonso Petrucci
