= View of Pillnitz Castle =

Painting by Johan Christian Dahl

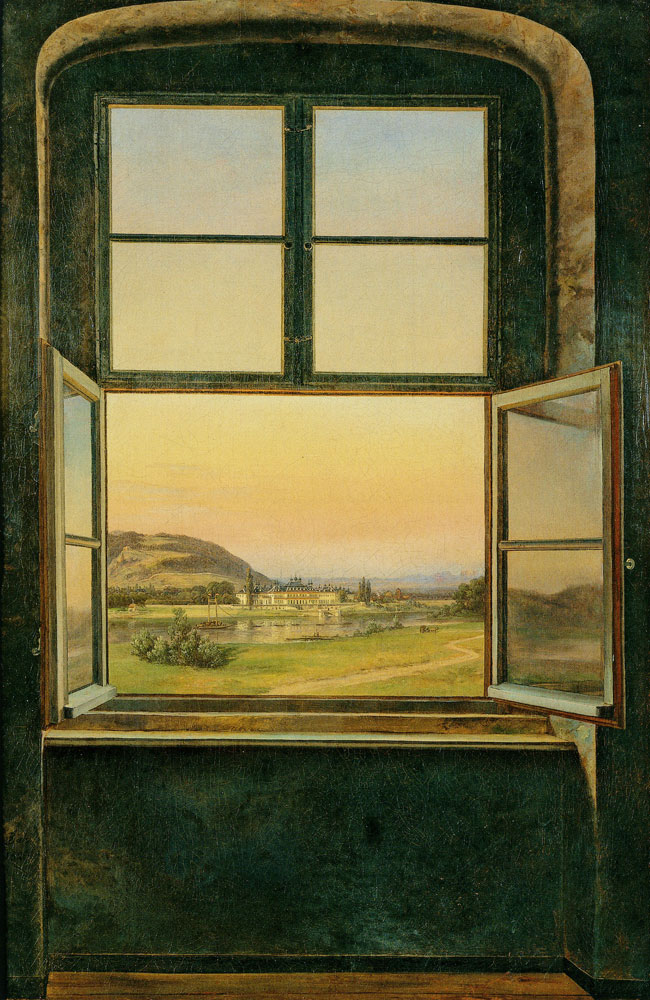
- Artist: Johan Christian Dahl
- Year: 1823
- Type: Oil on canvas, landscape painting
- Dimensions: 70 cm × 45.5 cm (28 in × 17.9 in)
- Location: Museum Folkwang, Essen

View of Pillnitz Castle is an oil on canvas landscape painting by the Norwegian artist Johan Christian Dahl, from 1823.

It depicts a view of the baroque Pillnitz Castle outside Dresden on the River Elbe. Dahl had long since settled in the city, and worked on romantic landscapes in the same style as his friend Caspar David Friedrich. The painting's unusual composition comes from the scene being a view out through an opened window. It is implied that it is seen from the artist's studio in the city, although Pillnitz is in fact located several miles upriver. In his delicate depiction of the case Dahl had to use the technique of a miniaturist

Today the painting is in the collection of the Museum Folkwang, in Essen.

== Bibliography ==
- Johnston, Catherine, Borsch-Supan, Helmut & Leppien, Helmut R. Baltic Light: Early Open-air Painting in Denmark and North Germany. Yale University Press, 1999.
- Lund, Hans. Text as Picture: Studies in the Literary Transformation of Pictures. E. Mellen Press, 1992.
- Rewald, Sabine. Rooms with a View: The Open Window in the 19th Century. Metropolitan Museum of Art, 2011.
