= Bernardino Maffei =

Italian archbishop and cardinal (1514–1553)

- Archbishop of Chieti
- Church: Catholic Church
- Archdiocese: Archdiocese of Chieti
- In office: 9 November 1549 – 14 July 1553
- Predecessor: Gian Pietro Carafa
- Successor: Marcantonio Maffei
- Other post: Cardinal-Priest of San Ciriaco alle Terme Diocleziane (1549-1553)
- Previous posts: Bishop of Caserta (1549); Bishop of Massa Marittima (1547-1549)

Orders
- Consecration: 30 May 1547 by Giovanni Giacomo Barba
- Created cardinal: 8 April 1549 by Pope Paul III

Personal details
- Born: 27 January 1514 Rome, Papal States
- Died: 16 July 1553 (aged 39) Rome, Papal States

Bernardino Maffei (Rome, 27 January 1514 – Rome, 16 July 1553) was an Italian archbishop and cardinal.

He studied jurisprudence at Padua, and during the frequent absence of Dandino acted as secretary to Cardinal Alessandro Farnese, and later to Pope Paul III.

On 12 March 1547, he was made Bishop of Massa Marittima, Bishop of Caserta (June 1549), and then Archbishop of Chieti (November 1549), and on 8 April 1549, raised to the purple. He was on intimate terms with St. Ignatius Loyola and was highly esteemed by pope Julius III. His commentary on the "Letters of Cicero" is one of the best. He also wrote: "De inscriptionibus et imaginibus veterum numismatum".

Catholic Church titles
Preceded by Alessandro Farnese (iuniore)	Bishop of Massa Marittima; 1547–1549	Succeeded by Miguel da Silva
Preceded by Gregorio Cortese	Cardinal-Priest of San Ciriaco alle Terme Diocleziane; 1549–1553	Succeeded by Giovanni Andrea Mercurio
Preceded by Marzio Cerboni	Bishop of Caserta; 1549	Succeeded by Federico Cesi
Preceded by Gian Pietro Carafa	Archbishop of Chieti; 1549–1553	Succeeded by Marcantonio Maffei
