= Juno Ludovisi =

1st century Roman marble head

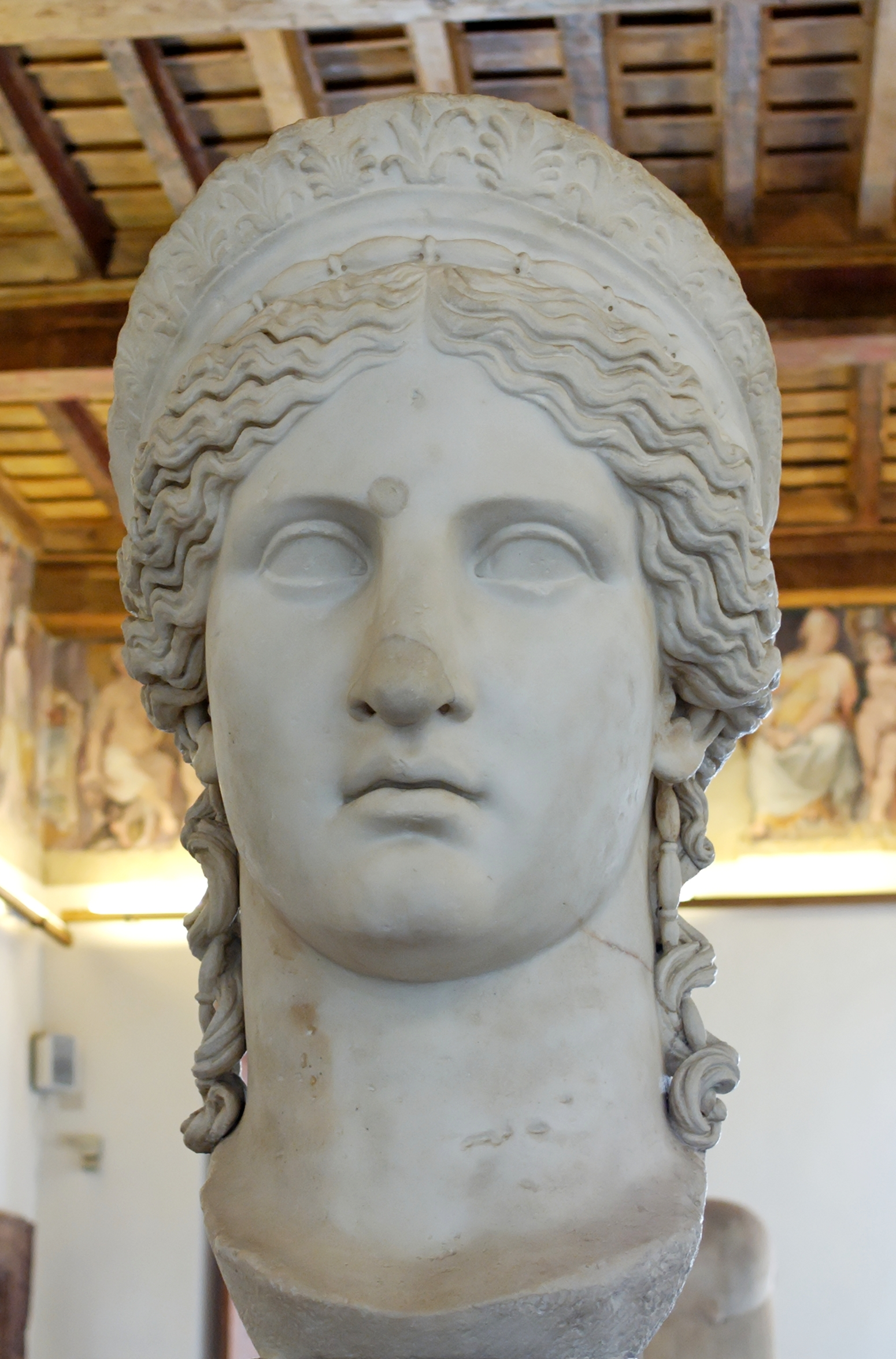
- Created: 1st century A.D.
- Place: Palazzo Altemps
- Present location: Rome
- Identification: inv. 8631

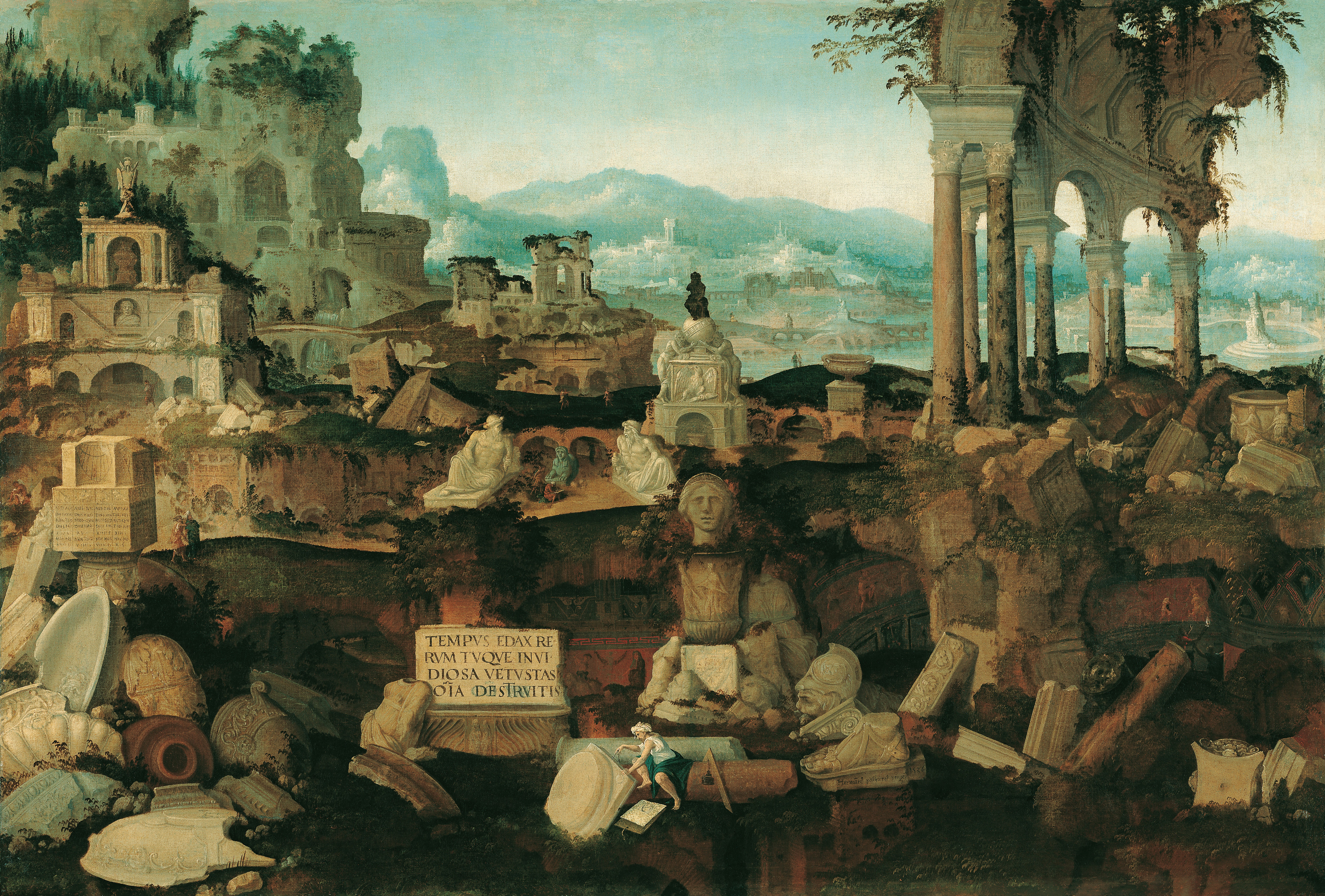
Landscape with Roman Ruins by Herman Posthumus (1536), a collage of Roman ruins with the bust at the forefront (Collection: Liechtenstein Museum)

3D model, click to interact.

The Juno Ludovisi (also called Hera Ludovisi) is a colossal Roman marble head of the 1st century CE from an acrolithic statue of an idealized and youthful Antonia Minor as the goddess Juno. Added to the Ludovisi collection formed by Cardinal Ludovico Ludovisi, it is now in the Palazzo Altemps, Museo Nazionale Romano, Rome.

Casts of it are in the Museum of Classical Archaeology, Cambridge, England; Bryn Mawr College, Pennsylvania, USA; the Goethehaus in Weimar, Germany; George Mason University, Johnson Center, Fairfax, USA; the University of Helsinki, Department of Art History, Finland; and the University of Tartu Art Museum, Estonia.

== Description ==
The sculpture was made of Parian marble, and is generally considered to be a posthumous and deified portrait of Antonia Minor, mother of Claudius.

The bust was probably found in Rome, and prior to joining the Ludovisi Collection, was owned by Cardinal Federico Cesi.

There is debate over whether in addition to Antonia Minor the bust could represent Livia.

== Legacy and Popular Culture ==
As early as 1536, the presence of the sculpture was known to the general public prior to the ownership by Ludovisi. The painting, Landscape with Roman Ruins by painter Herman Posthumus depicts the bust at forefront, surrounded by Egyptian and Roman sculpture fragments with a quote from Ovid's Metamorphoses: "TEMPVS EDAX RERVM TVQVE INVIDIOSA VESTVSTAS O[MN]IA DESTRVITIS" (Translated: Oh, most voracious time, and you, envious Age, you destroy everything).

The sculpture is known to have been greatly admired by Goethe, who bought a cast of it, soon after seeing it in Rome.

The American-British novelist Henry James mentions the Ludovisi Juno several times including in his first long form novel Roderick Hudson. He described it in its surround as follows..."One warm, still day, late in the Roman autumn, our two young men were seated beneath one of the high-stemmed pines of the Villa Ludovisi. They had been spending an hour in the mouldy little garden-house where the colossal mask of the famous Juno looks out with blank eyes from that dusky corner which must seem to her the last possible stage of a lapse from Olympus"...

== Bibliography ==
- Nunzio Giustozzi, "Una Giunone adorata", in Adriano La Regina (a cura di), Museo nazionale romano, Electa, Milano 2005, ISBN 88-370-3743-0, p. 140.
