= Miguel da Silva =

Portuguese nobleman

His Eminence D. Miguel da Silva
- Cardinal, Bishop Emeritus of Viseu
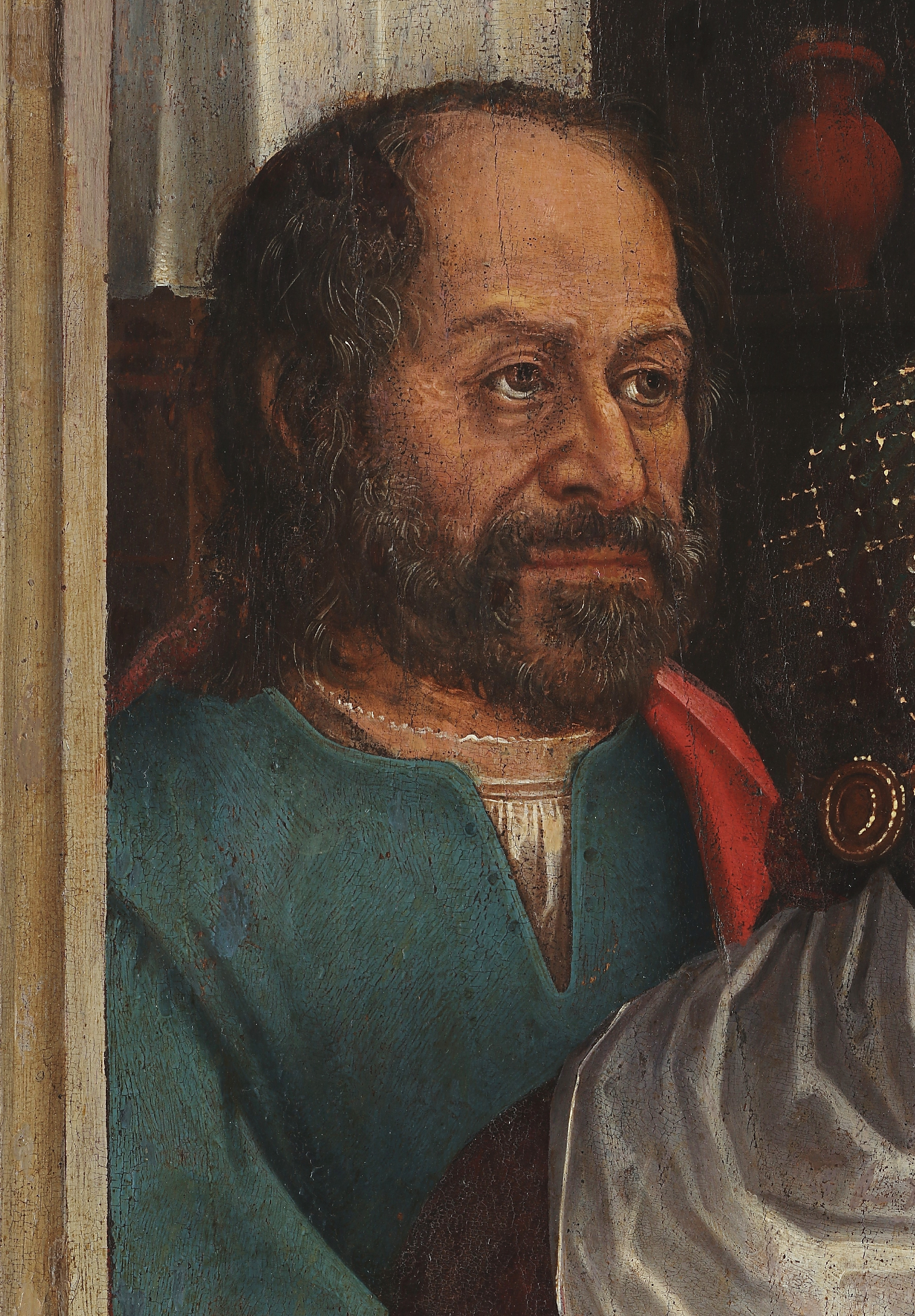
- Donor portrait in Christ in the House of Martha, c. 1535-40 (Grão Vasco National Museum)
- Church: Roman Catholic Church
- Diocese: Viseu
- Appointed: 21 November 1526
- Predecessor: João de Chaves
- Successor: Alessandro Farnese
- Other posts: Cardinal-Priest of Santi XII Apostoli (1542-1543); Cardinal-Priest of Santa Prassede (1543-1552); Cardinal-Priest of San Marcello (1552-1553); Cardinal-Priest of San Pancrazio (1553); Cardinal-Priest of Santa Maria in Trastevere (1553-1556)

Orders
- Ordination: December 1529
- Created cardinal: 19 December 1539 (in pectore); 2 December 1541 (published) by Pope Paul III
- Rank: Cardinal-Priest

Personal details
- Born: Miguel da Silva e Meneses c. 1480 Évora, Portugal
- Died: 5 June 1556 (aged 75–76) Rome, Papal States
- Parents: D. Diogo da Silva, 1st Count of Portalegre; D. Maria de Ayala
- Education: University of Paris

Styles of Miguel da Silva
- Reference style: His Eminence
- Spoken style: Your Eminence
- Religious style: Cardinal
- Informal style: Cardinal

Miguel da Silva (c. 1480 – 5 June 1556) was a Portuguese nobleman, the second son of Diogo da Silva, 1st Count of Portalegre and of his wife Maria de Ayala, a Castilian noblewomen. He was ambassador of the king of Portugal to several popes, and papal ambassador to the Emperor and others.

Sometimes referred to through antonomasia as the Cardinal of Viseu (Portuguese: Cardeal de Viseu), he was Bishop of Viseu (Portugal), and Apostolic Administrator of the diocese of Massa Maritima (Tuscany). He was a cardinal of the Holy Roman Church from 1539 to 1556, and served as governor of several papal states.

== Education and career ==
Silva was educated at the University of Paris, then in Siena, then Bologna, and finally in Rome. After his stay in Rome, he travelled to Venice, and from there he returned to Portugal, visiting several European principalities along the way. On his return to Portugal in 1502, he was appointed escrivão da puridade, or keeper of the royal seal, to the eldest son of King Manuel I, who succeeded him as John III of Portugal.

He was appointed by King Manuel I of Portugal as ambassador to Rome in 1514. He served in that post during the reigns of popes Leo X, Adrian VI and Clement VII. Both Leo X and Clement VII wanted to make him a Cardinal, but were opposed by the Portuguese Crown.

He was recalled to Lisbon in 1525 where he served as member of the Royal Council. Pope Clement VII appointed him Bishop of Viseu on 21 November 1526. He resigned the see on 22 April 1547, in favor of Cardinal Alessandro Farnese, the grandson of Pope Paul III.

Pope Paul III finally elevated Miguel da Silva to the cardinalate on 19 December 1539, though the appointment was kept secret (in pectore) for the time being. Falling out of favour with King John III of Portugal, D. Miguel da Silva ran away to Rome in 1540, where he was warmly welcomed to the Curia by Paul III. His status as a Cardinal was revealed in 1541, and on 6 February 1542 he was assigned the titular church of Ss. XII Apostolorum. King John III of Portugal promptly condemned him on a charge of treason and revoked his Portuguese nationality.

On 30 August 1542, Silva was named Legate to the Emperor Charles V.

On 9 January 1545, he was appointed Legate of the Marches of Ancona, and on 19 March 1545 was also named governor of Fermo.

He served as papal legate to Venice and Bologna.

On 20 May 1549, he was named Apostolic Administrator of the diocese of Massa Marittima by Pope Paul III.

Silva took part in the papal conclave following the death of Paul III, which began on 29 November 1549 and concluded on 7 February 1550 with the election of Cardinal Giovanni Maria Ciocchi del Monte, who took the name Julius III. He also took part in the conclave following the death of Julius III, which began on 5 April 1555 and ended on 9 April 1555, with the election of Cardinal Marcello Cervini, who took the name Marcellus II. He died three weeks later, on 30 April. A conclave followed immediately, opening on 15 May 1555 and concluding on 23 May with the election of Giampetro Carafa (Paul IV).

Silva died in Rome on 5 June 1556, and was buried in the church of S. Maria in Trastevere, which had been his titular church since 11 December 1553.

Greatly praised for his classical culture and command of ancient languages, he was a personal friend of the painter Raffaello Sanzio. Baldassare Castiglione dedicated his masterpiece Il Cortegiano to Silva.

== Sources ==
- Cardella, Lorenzo (1793). Memorie storiche de' cardinali della santa Romana chiesa (in Italian). Vol. Tomo quattro (4). Roma: Pagliarini. pp. 233–236.
- Gulik, Guilelmus (1923). Eubel, Conradus (ed.). Hierarchia catholica (in Latin). Vol. Tomus 3 (second ed.). Münster: Libreria Regensbergiana.
- Deswarte, Sylvie, "La Rome de D. Miguel da Silva (1515-1525)," O Humanismo Português. Primeiro Simpósio Nacional, 21-25 de Outubro de 1985. Lisboa: Il Centenario da Academia das Ciencias de Lisboa, 1988, pp. 177–307.
- Deswarte, Sylvie, Il "perfetto cortegiano," D. Miguel da Silva. Roma: Bulzoni Editore, 1989.
- Paiva, J.P. Os Bispos de Portugal e do Império 1495-1777. Coimbra, Universidade de Coimbra, 2006

Catholic Church titles
Preceded by João de Chaves	Roman Catholic Bishop of Viseu; 1526–1547	Succeeded by Alessandro Farnese
Records
Preceded by Ennio Filonardi	Oldest living Member of the Sacred College; 9 December 1549 - 5 June 1556	Succeeded by Claude de Longwy de Givry
