= Ulrich Blank =

German engineer

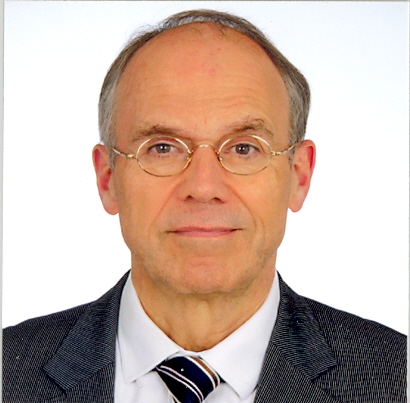
Ulrich Blank in 2017

Ulrich Blank (born June 29, 1948, in Duisburg) is a doctor of industrial engineering in Essen, Germany. He was for many years CEO of Heinrich Industrie AG and was a member of various supervisory boards and advisory boards of family businesses. In September 2018, he was awarded the Cross of Merit of the Federal Republic of Germany for his many years of voluntary work in the cultural field, in particular in favor of the Museum Folkwang. In September 2023, Ulrich Blank was awarded the Medal of Merit of the City of Essen.

== Activity in the culture committee of the city of Aachen ==
Ulrich Blank studied electrical engineering and economics at the RWTH Aachen, where he also obtained his doctorate. In this time already he engaged himself as a member of German liberal party FDP in the field of cultural politics, which is why this party appointed him in the culture committee of the city of Aachen after the municipal election of 1975. His work there until 1979 brought him together with the Aachen industrialist and patron Peter Ludwig, from whose donations to the city of Cologne at that very time the Museum Ludwig emerged. Blank remained member of the FDP for more than 30 years later on.

== Work for the Folkwang Museum ==
Since 1996, Blank has been a member of the Folkwang Museum Association (Folkwang-Museumsverein e.V.), where he became treasurer in 2005, then in 2015 chairman, succeeding Achim Middelschulte. Since 2006, the museum has completed five major special exhibitions, whose implementation was administratively planned and financially monitored by Ulrich Blank. In contrast to other museum associations, the Folkwang Museum Association, founded in 1922, is the owner of the Folkwang Museum's collections in equal shares with the city of Essen due to a contract signed in the same year.

== Further cultural engagement ==
As a co-initiator and supporter of the scholarship program Junge Kunst in Essen [Young Art in Essen], he enabled non-established artists to present their work to the public. Since 2006, Ulrich Blank has also been a member of the board of the Society of Friends and Supporters of the Folkwang University of the Arts e.V., for which he is a jury member in competitions, as a contact for students and in various projects. As a board member of the Forum Kreuzeskirche e.V. (since 2007) and also a member of the board of trustees of the Förderverein Evangelische Kirche Werden e.V., he is particularly committed to the church music program.

== Private life ==
Blank has been married to Marie Luise Blank (born Werhahn) since 1974, they are parents of four adult children. His hobbies include cooking and playing the oboe. He lives in the Essen district of Bredeney.

== Literature ==
- Blank, Ulrich: Entwicklung eines Verfahrens zur Segmentierung von Warenverteilungssystemen [= Development of a Process for the Segmentation of Goods Distribution Systems], 151 p. (PhD Theses); Aachen, 1980

== External Web Links ==
- Cross of Merit of the Federal Republic of Germany awarded to Dr. Ulrich Blank [in German] (Press Release of the city of Essen, issued Sept 21, 2018)
- Interview with Ulrich Blank on the occasion of his election as chairman of the Folkwang Museum Association [in German] (Martina Schürmann, Westdeutsche Allgemeine Zeitung vom 22.7.2015)
