= Susanna in the Bath (Corinth) =

Painting by Lovis Corinth

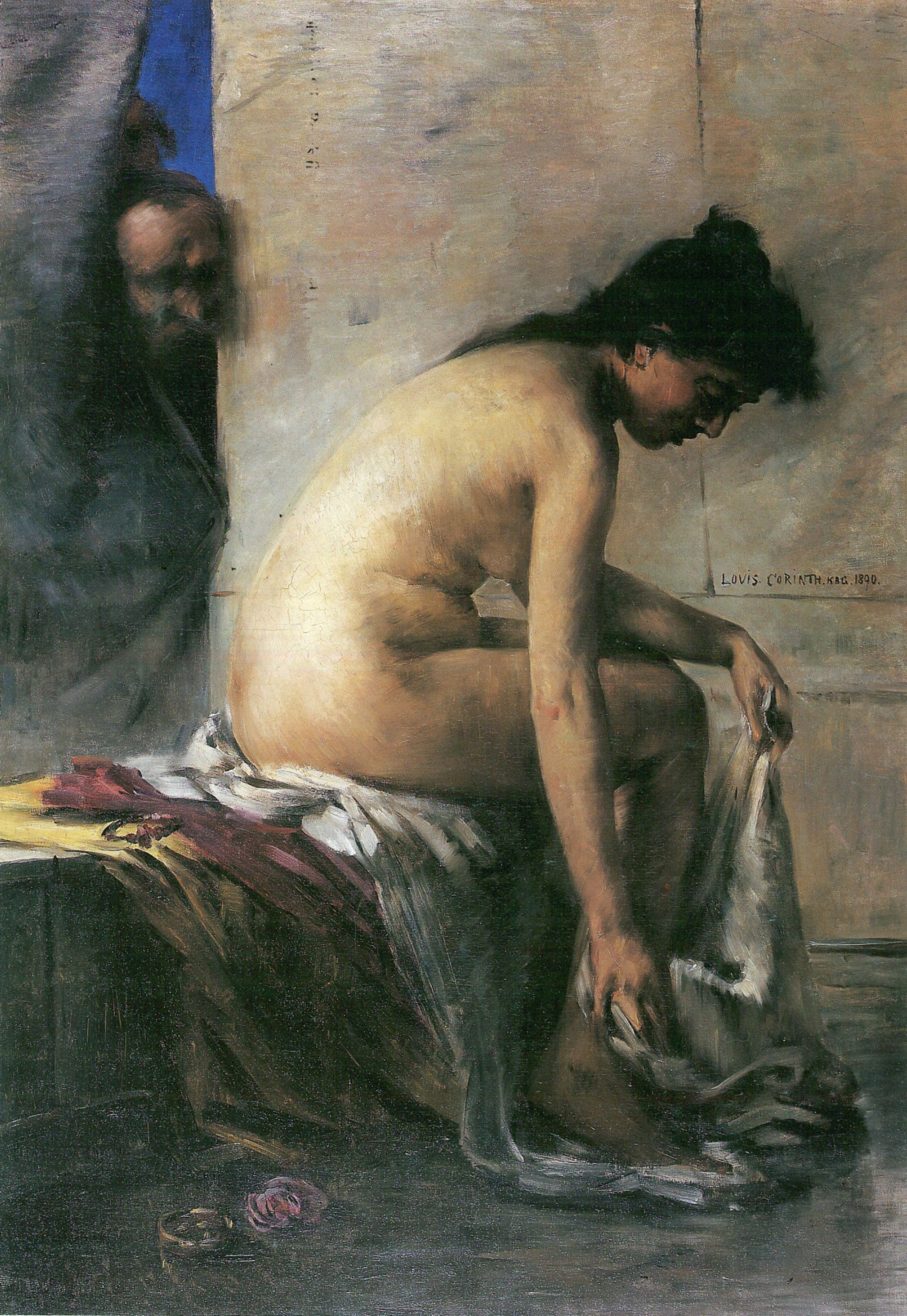
- Artist: Lovis Corinth
- Year: 1890
- Medium: Oil on canvas
- Dimensions: 159 cm × 111 cm (63 in × 44 in)
- Location: Museum Folkwang, Essen

Susanna in the Bath (German: Susanna im Bade) (BC 74) is an early painting by German painter Lovis Corinth, created in 1890 in his hometown of Königsberg (now Kaliningrad, Russia). Corinth painted two slightly different versions of it, the first of which he exhibited at the Salon de Paris in 1891. The initial version, believed to be lost, was rediscovered in 2006 through a private auction. The better-known second version, however, has been part of the Museum Folkwang, in Essen, since 1966.

Executed in oil on canvas, the portrait painting measures 159 × 111 cm. In this artwork, Corinth explores the Bible story of Susanna in the Bath, a theme that has been popular and frequently depicted in visual arts. He transforms the story into a nude portrayal, depicting Susanna unclothed after bathing, with two men secretly observing her. The artist himself served as the model for these two observers, effectively casting himself as a voyeur. Remarkable is Susanna's very realistic and naturalistic representation, which did not correspond to the usual painting styles of the masters of the time. However, the combination of a nude depiction and a history painting met the prevailing taste of the public at that time.

== Description ==
The painting shows a naked young woman drying and dressing herself after a bath. The painter is in a slight sub-position and looks sideways at the subject, who is seated in a somewhat elevated position. Susanna occupies a prominent position in the foreground of the painting, seated on a bench and leaning forward from the right. She extends her right hand to a white towel lying on the floor, covering the upper part of her breast with her right arm, revealing the nipple and a section of her thigh. Meanwhile, her left hand holds one end of the towel, resting on the left knee. She attends to drying her leg with an arched back and forward-facing shoulders. Though her head is slightly raised, her face remains in shadow, fixated on her garments. Illuminated by light from the left, her back takes on a bright glow, positioned centrally in the composition. In contrast, the front of her body and legs are shrouded in the right-side shadow.

The backdrop consists of smooth, large stone slabs with distinct joints. This spans approximately three-quarters of the picture's front width, serving as the complete background for the woman dressing. The remaining quarter features a gray curtain pulled to the left in the upper section. Through the opening in the blue sky, a bearded man's face is visible, looking directly at an unclothed woman. Behind him, another man with a less distinct face also gazes at the woman. Susanna's clothing, consisting of a white undergarment and a vibrant robe fashioned from red and gold fabric, is scattered across the bench where she is seated and the floor below. On top of the garments is a golden bracelet, and on the floor is a rose petal and another bangle.

The painting bears the signature and date 'Lovis Corinth KBG 1890,' positioned on the right side near the center of the wall.

== Background and origin ==
Susanna im Bade draws from the frequently revisited biblical tale of Susanna im Bad (Susanna in the Bath), originally found in the Apocrypha of the Book of Daniel. Susanna, a woman who fears God, is seen bathing in her husband's garden by two elders or judges. They harassed her, but she rejects them. In retaliation, they accuse her of adultery. During the trial that follows, Daniel reveals the truth, and the elders are punished with death.

Painted by Corinth in 1890, Susanna im Bade exists in two versions that vary only in minute details. According to the signature, they were painted in his hometown of Königsberg, now Kaliningrad. According to Charlotte Berend-Corinth, the two versions are almost identical: "The differences are in the treatment of the bangle on the bench, the rose on the floor, and the drapery." She also noted in the description of the portrait Polanger Jüdin (BC 76), painted in Königsberg, that it was a preparatory work for the painting Susanna im Bade. Therefore, it can be assumed that this young woman acted as a model for Susanna.

=== Chronological classification ===
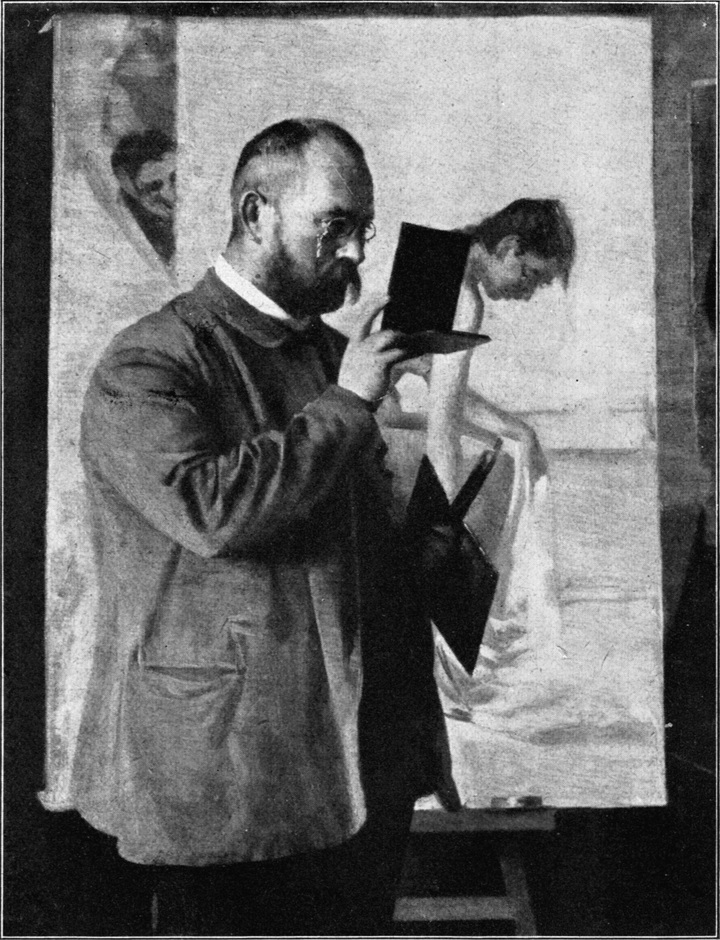
Lovis Corinth, portrayed by Carl Bublitz in 1890 in front of the unfinished painting of Susanna in the Bath

In 1880, Lovis Corinth embarked on an art study journey at the Academy of Art in Munich, a paramount center for painting alongside Paris during that era. He enrolled in classes conducted by renowned painters such as Franz Defregger, Wilhelm Trübner, and Ludwig von Löfftz, aligning himself with the currents of naturalism. Concurrently, he engaged significantly in nude painting as a vital aspect of his education. A short break resulted from his military service from 1882 to 1883, after which Corinth went to Antwerp in 1884. There, he underwent a three-month apprenticeship under Paul Eugène Gorge, followed by his move to Paris in October 1884, where he spent three years and enrolled in the private Académie Julian. This institution provided an opportunity mainly for foreign painters and women. These individuals were usually not accepted at the well-known École des Beaux-Arts. He received guidance in his studies from Tony Robert-Fleury and William Adolphe Bouguereau. With them, Corinth delved into the realm of primarily nude depictions of women (Peinture de la femme). Bouguereau, notable for his success in mythological and allegorical scenes populated by female nudes, particularly left an impression. Corinth had the opportunity to visit and observe both masters in their studios in the Galérie Montmartre.

His artwork Das Komplott (The Plot), created under Gorge's guidance, marked his debut at the Paris Salon in 1885. In 1887, Lovis Corinth relocated to Berlin, spending the ensuing winter there. During his time in the city, he met notable figures such as Max Klinger, Walter Leistikow, and Karl Stauffer-Bern. It was likely in Berlin that he produced his inaugural self-portrait, initiating a series of such portraits throughout his life. In the following year, however, he returned to his now seriously ill father in Königsberg and portrayed him there several times before he died on January 10, 1889. The creation of Susanna im Bade followed this period, taking place in the year after his father's demise, while Corinth was still situated in Königsberg in East Prussia. During this time, his fellow artist Carl Bublitz depicted Corinth. In a reciprocation of artistic exchange, Corinth gazed into a handheld mirror as he painted the background figures of two elderly individuals, a practice that took place before the incomplete Susanna im Bade painting. Corinth himself painted a portrait of the painter Bublitz in return, in which, as in the portrait of the actor Ragall, also painted in Königsberg, he implemented his experiences from Antwerp and Paris and designed them with clear borrowings from the painting of Frans Hals. He portrayed Bublitz in his own studio in front of the still unfinished portrait Schwimmanstalt bei Grothe, Königsberg.

During the same year, in 1890, Lovis Corinth's painting Pietà, which he had submitted to the Paris Salon, received an award. Encouraged by this success, Corinth decided to return to Munich, aiming to continue working there. He also presented his work Susanna im Bade to the Paris Salon, where it was showcased in 1891. The painting was accepted because it combined a nude portrayal with a historical scene, which matched the taste of the public and the Salon jury during that period. In his self-biography, Corinth did not mention the painting, but he does describe his joy at the award for the Pietà:

"I should not find so much, for my father had always managed carefully, also the property was mainly laid out in a few houses. I still had to be practically active, as many skills as I possessed for it, but I did not want to shorten my time for art in any way. I rented a small studio for the time being and painted as well as I could. A motif from the Parisian period still haunted my mind, which demanded that I paint it: A Corpse of Christ on a Red Brick Floor. I sent it to the Salon in 1890, where I finally received the "Mention honorable" that I so ardently sought. Now the picture is in the gallery in Magdeburg. So, I had now happily achieved my purpose, admittedly a few years later. But above all, this small success encouraged me to break off my tents in Königsberg and return to Munich."

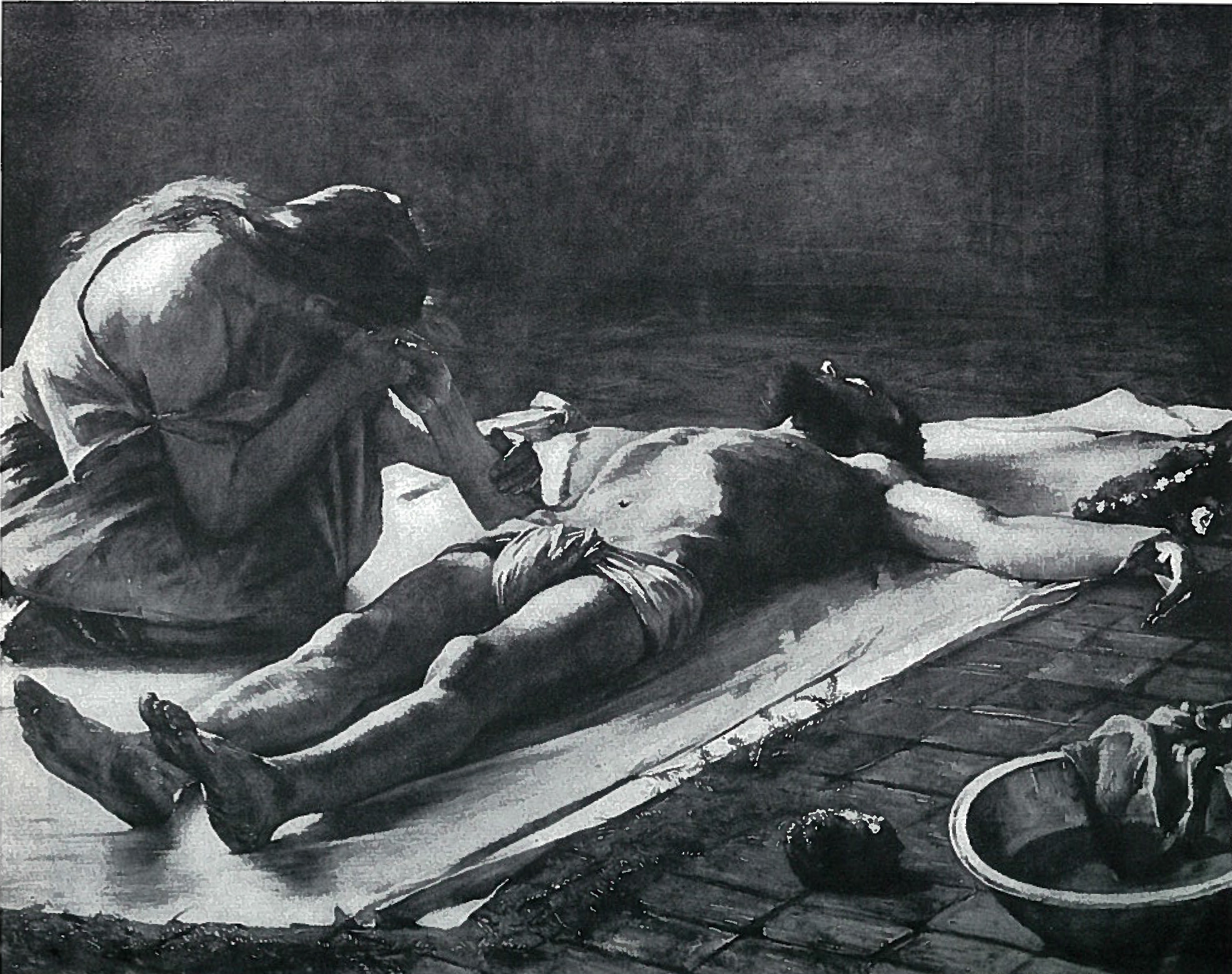
Pietà, 1889 (destroyed in 1945)

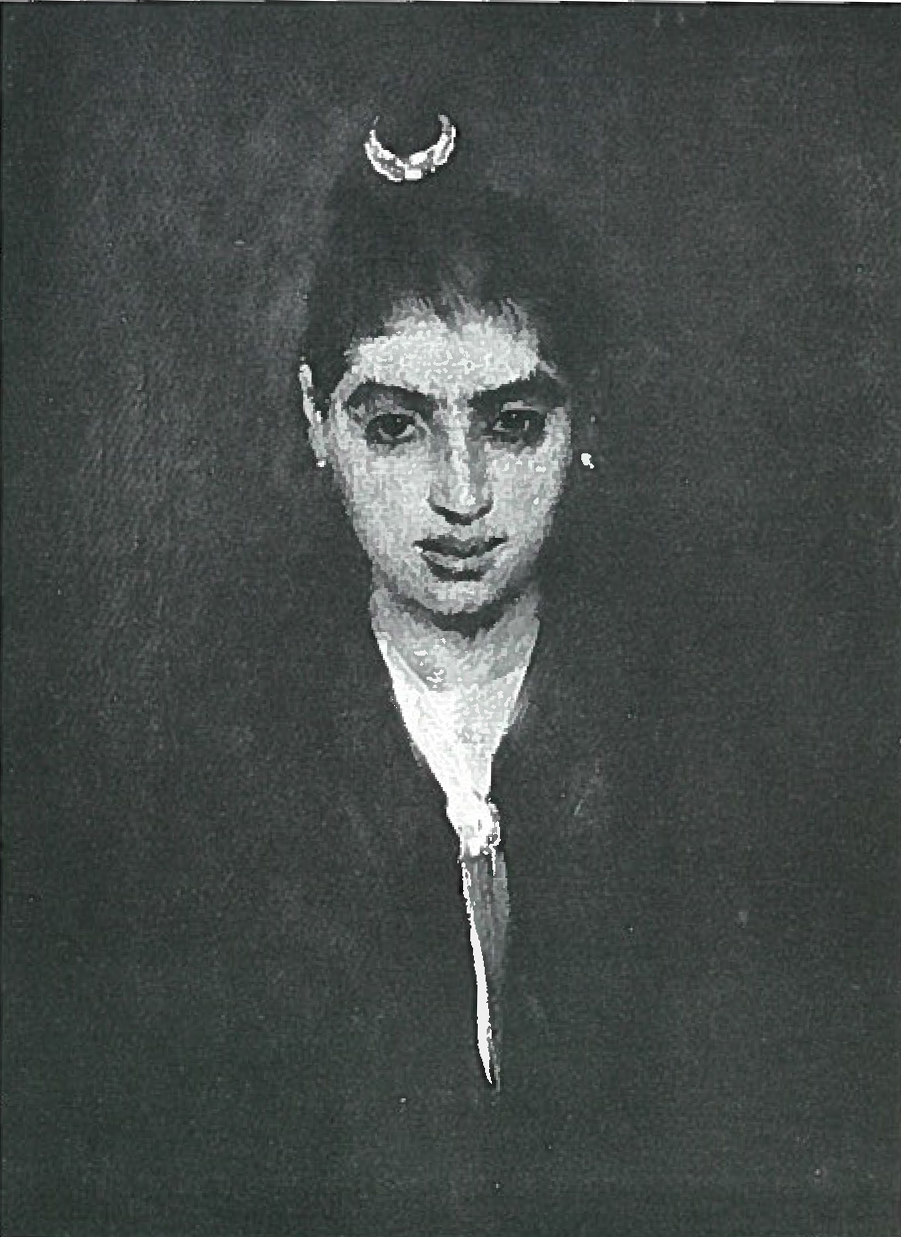
Jewess from Polang, 1890 (whereabouts unknown)

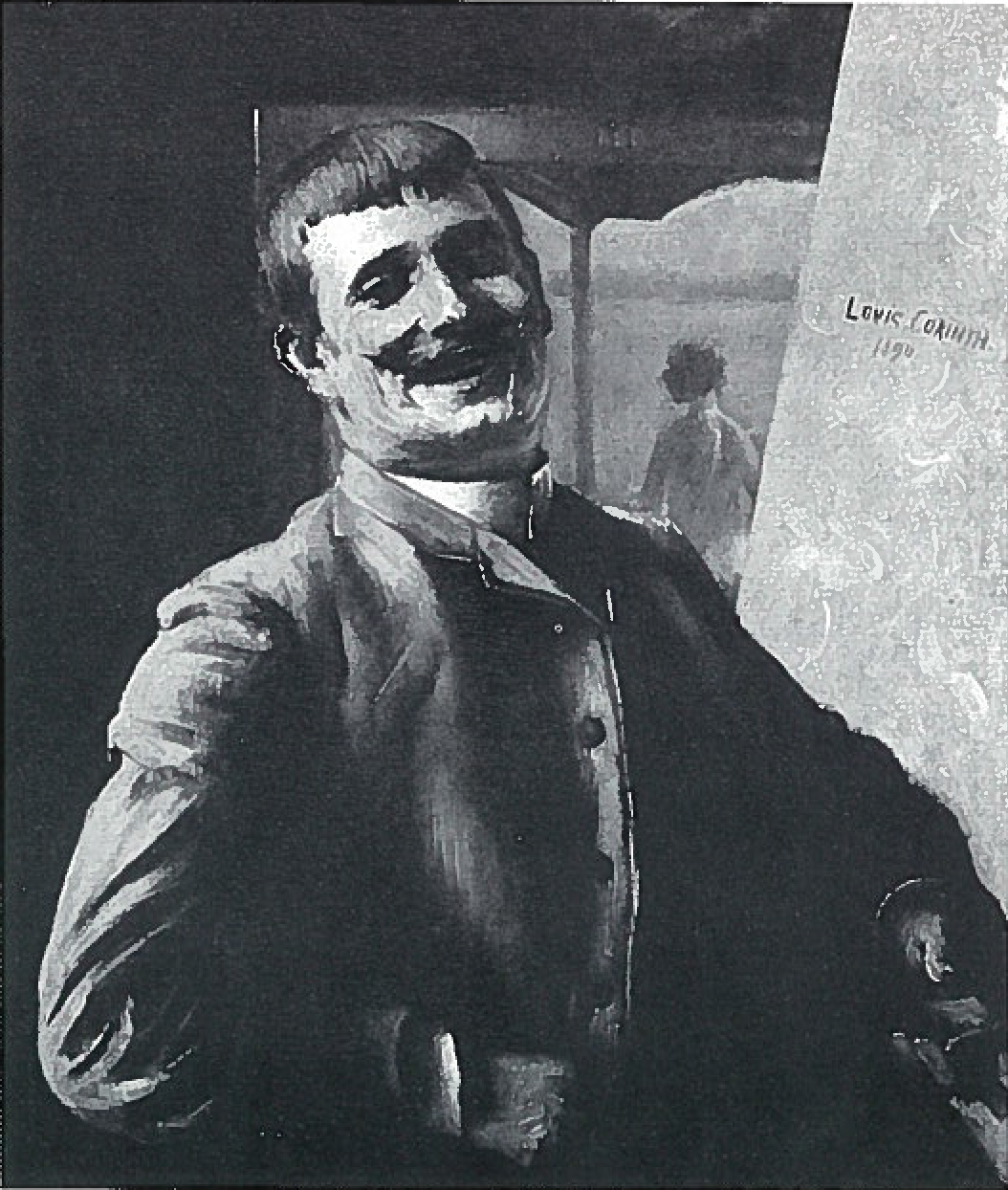
Portrait of the painter Bublitz, 1890

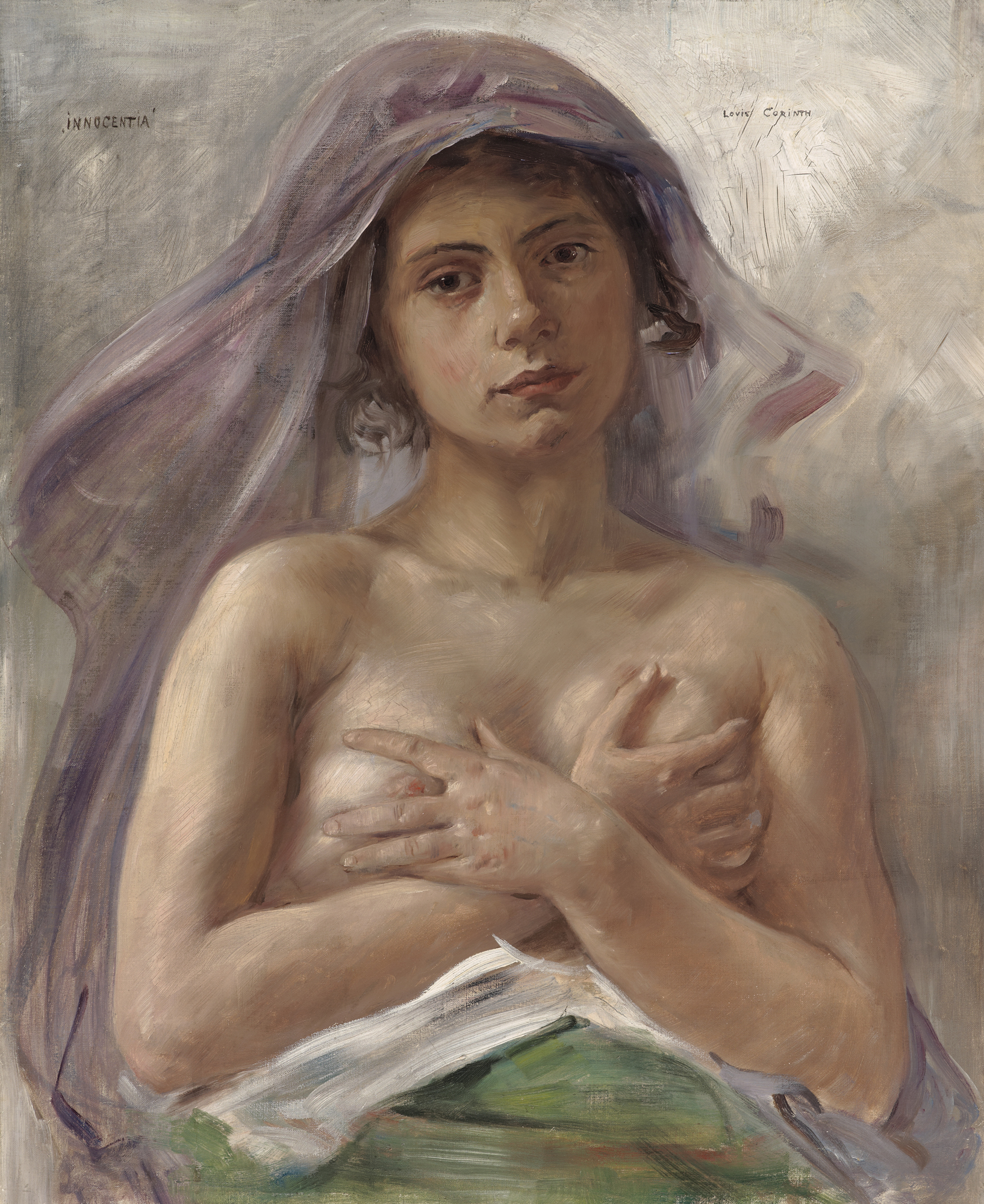
Innocentia, 1890

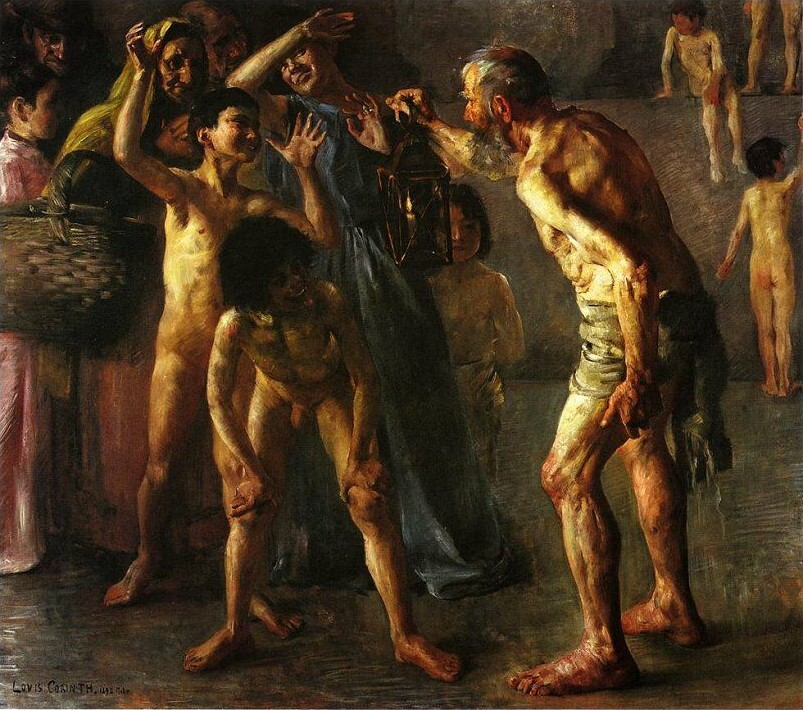
Diogenes, 1891

In 1891, he returned to Munich accordingly and concentrated on his further career as a painter, absorbing the various current trends in the vein of Klinger, Hans Thoma, and Arnold Böcklin, which brought more and more color to paintings previously dominated by tonal browns.

=== Classification ===
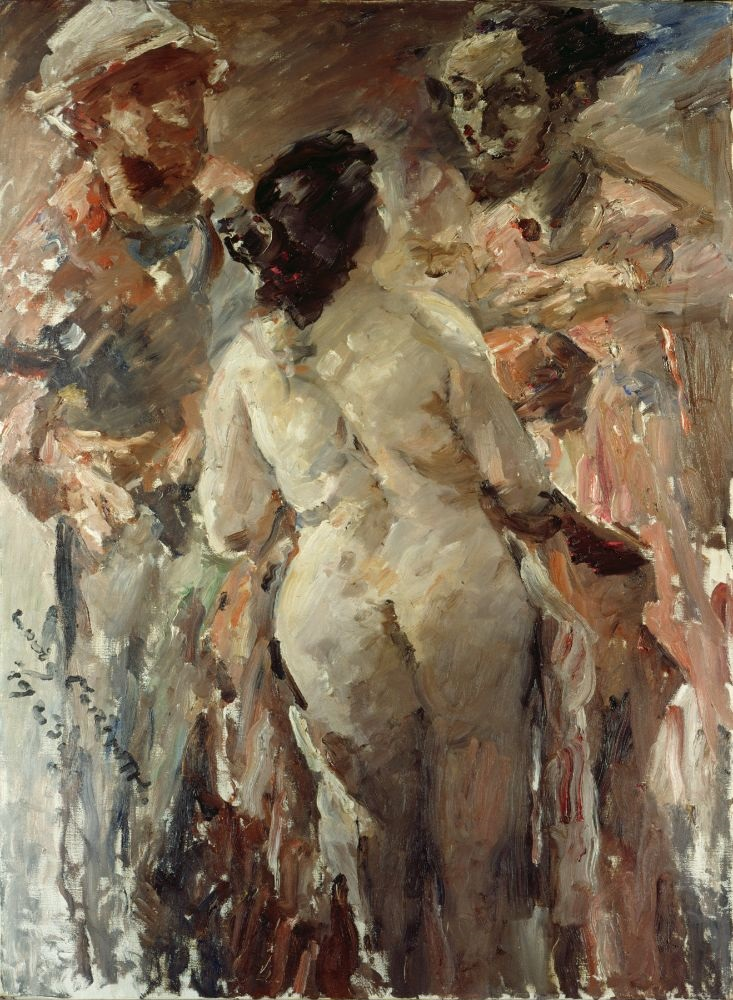
Susanna and the Two Elders, 1923 (BC 910)

Susanna im Bade holds significance as one of Corinth's early works, marking one of his initial forays into selecting a motif rooted in religious themes. In 1889, he achieved global recognition through works like Leichnam Christi (The Corpse of Christ) and particularly the related piece Pietà. Additionally, he revisited a biblical theme with Susanna im Bade. In this artwork, he merged it with his ongoing fascination for portraying female nudes, a focus that had been present since the early stages of his career and was particularly prominent during his apprenticeship years. According to Maria Makela, Corinth consistently employed the portrayal of mythological, literary, and biblical narratives to express broader social and political concerns.

In this work, Corinth takes up the motif of Susanna here for the first time. He continuously revisited this theme throughout his life, making it a constant presence throughout his creative career. He engaged with this theme across multiple instances, evident in paintings dating to 1897, 1909, and 1923, alongside individual drawings and prints. This demonstrates how his perspective on the story evolved over time and reflects his growth as an artist. Sevcik argues that Susanna's motif yielded more than a mere "pretext for the mobilization of nude painting, an element of significance to him." Rather, Corinth employed the motif as a course not solely for addressing artistic inquiries of form, but also to resolve broader artistic queries.

While Susanna im Bade emphasizes the voyeuristic aspect of the narrative, Corinth shifts his focus in subsequent works to the oppression Susanna faces from the two men. In the painting Susanna und die beiden Alten (Susanna and the Two Old Men) from 1897, the two men oppress the woman on the bench from behind, showing her in a frontal nude position. In Susanna im Bade from 1909, Corinth portrays a similar scene, but now the oppression has escalated into a more tangible assault. The old men are seen pressing down on the young woman's shoulder and getting very close to her. In 1923, Corinth depicted the scene once more. This time, Susanna is portrayed from behind, standing unclothed in front of the two men. This composition matches a drawing that Corinth initially created in 1890 and later colored in 1923. Corinth revisits the scene once more in 1923.

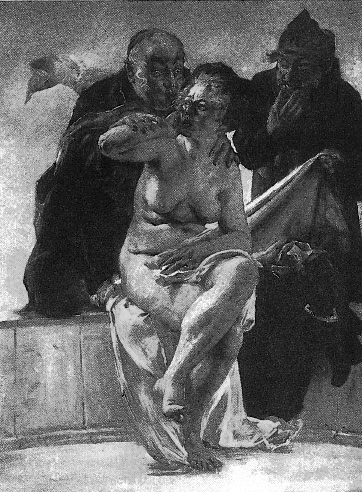
Susanna und die beiden Alten, 1897

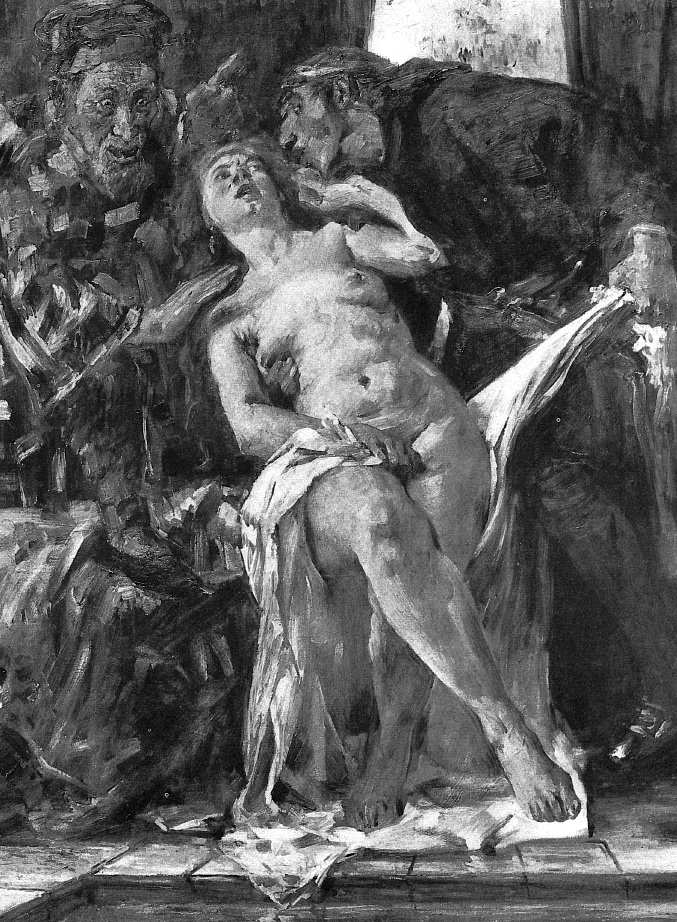
Susanna im Bade, 1909

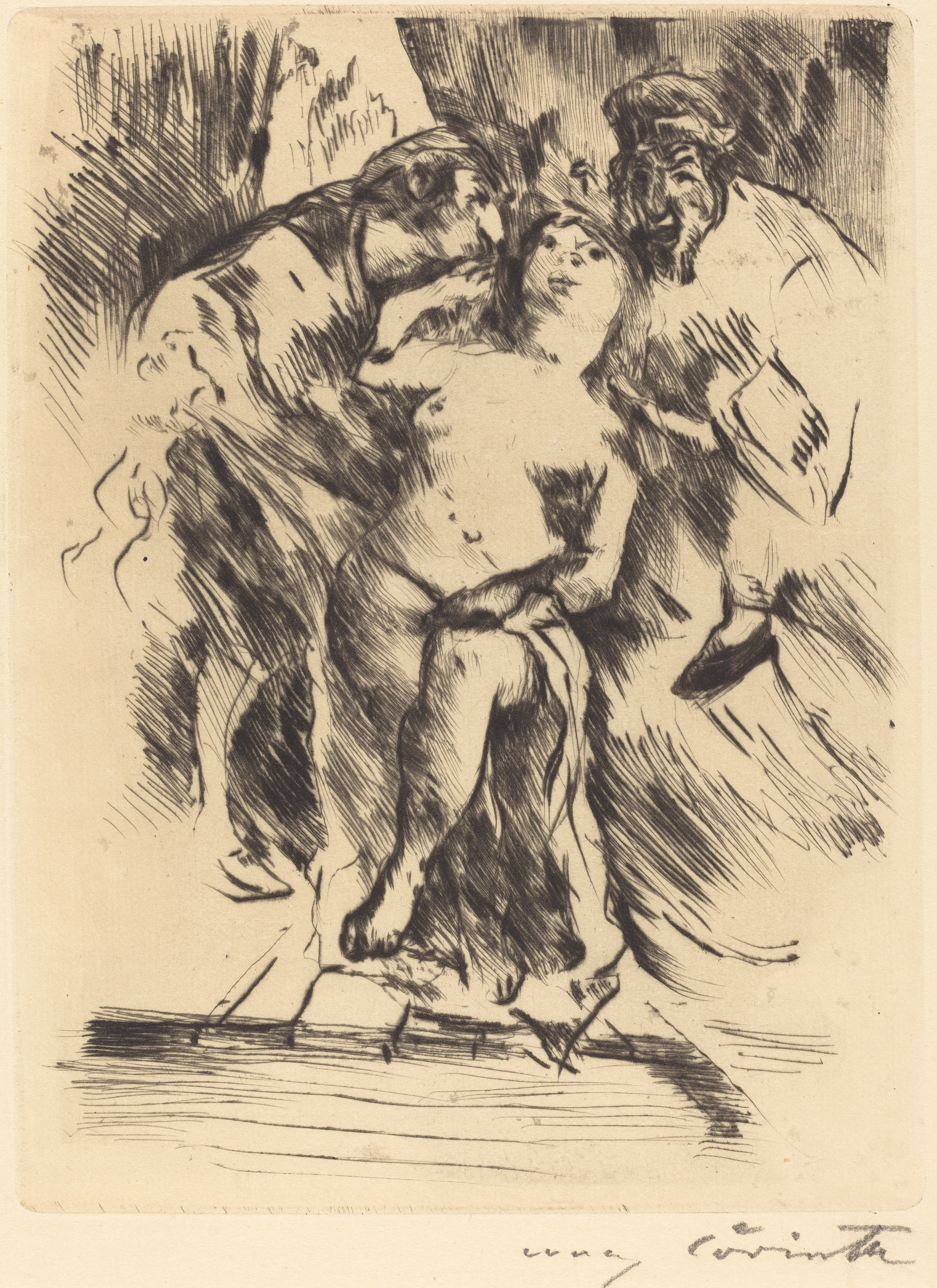
Susanna im Bade, 1914 (Kaltnadelradierung)

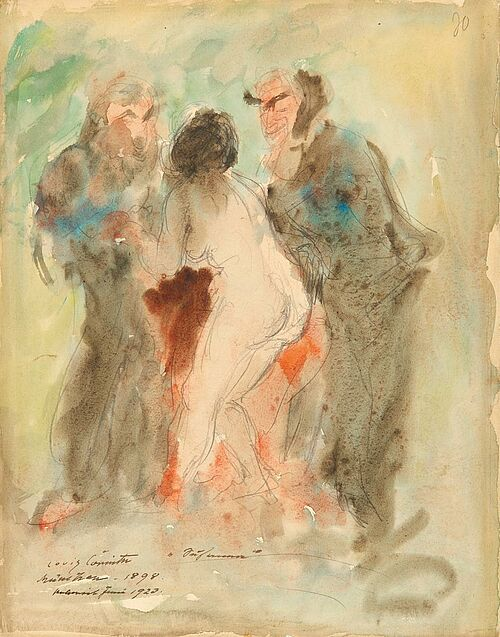
drawing Susanna; Drawn 1890, colored 1923

When interpreting the elderly characters, Corinth himself assumes the role of the model, as evidenced in the work by Bublitz. While his features are exaggerated, resembling a grimace, parallels can be drawn between these depictions and Corinth's extensive array of self-portraits.

== Interpretation and reception ==
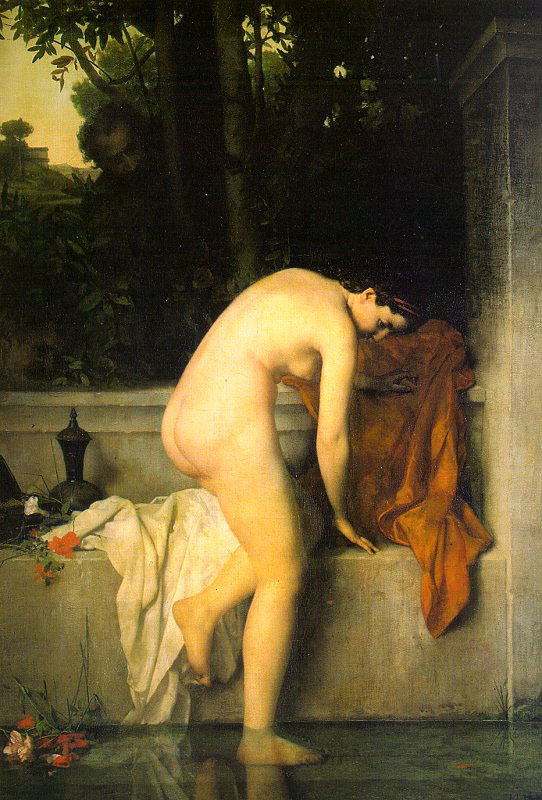
Jean-Jacques Henner: Chaste Susanna, c. 1863

The motif of Susanna holds a place within a longstanding pictorial tradition that takes root in the Renaissance and Baroque eras, continuing its influence into the modern period. Noteworthy works and potential sources of inspiration originate from artists such as Jacopo Tintoretto and Rembrandt, among others. Unlike many others who focused on depicting the forceful assault by the old men, often shown with intense groping, Corinth took a different approach. He concentrated on the less commonly depicted, more controlled moment of 'eavesdropping.

In this regard, Corinth's painting is occasionally compared to the painting Die keusche Susanna (The Chaste Susanna) by the French salon painter Jean-Jacques Henner, painted around 1863, which depicts a comparable aspect of the story. Corinth probably knew this contemporary painting from an exhibition at the Palais Luxembourg. In this context, Andrea Bärnreuther highlights how Corinth's depiction and painting differed from those of the French painters of the time: "Corinth's intention aimed at deforming the depiction of the nude and restoring the escaped life to the phrase-like depiction that kept every sensual thought at bay." According to Sevcik's observations in 2022, the primary distinction lies in Corinth's 'loose brushstrokes': 'Corinth's incarnate matter flickers, the draperies flow, the ground sparkles like a surface of water.'

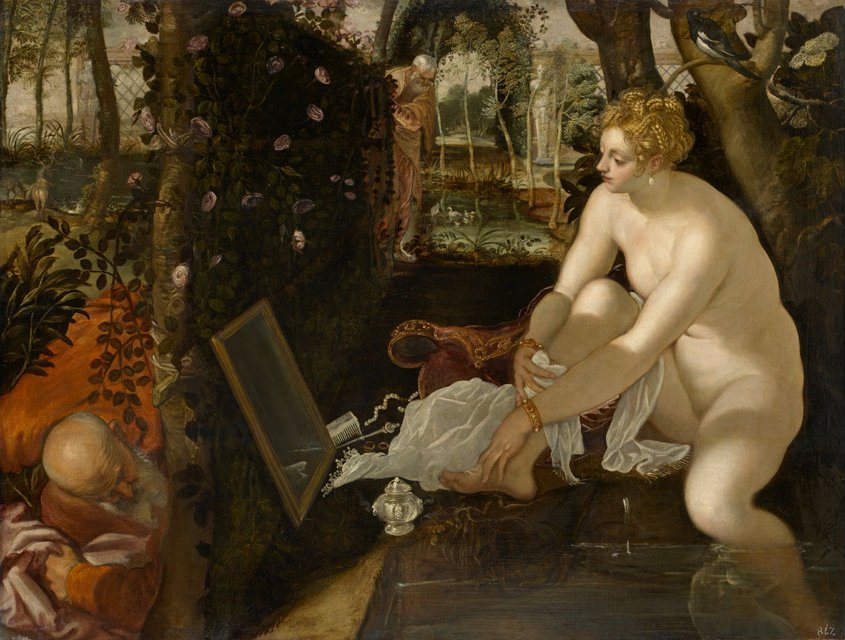
Jacopo Tintoretto: Susanna im Bade, 1555/56

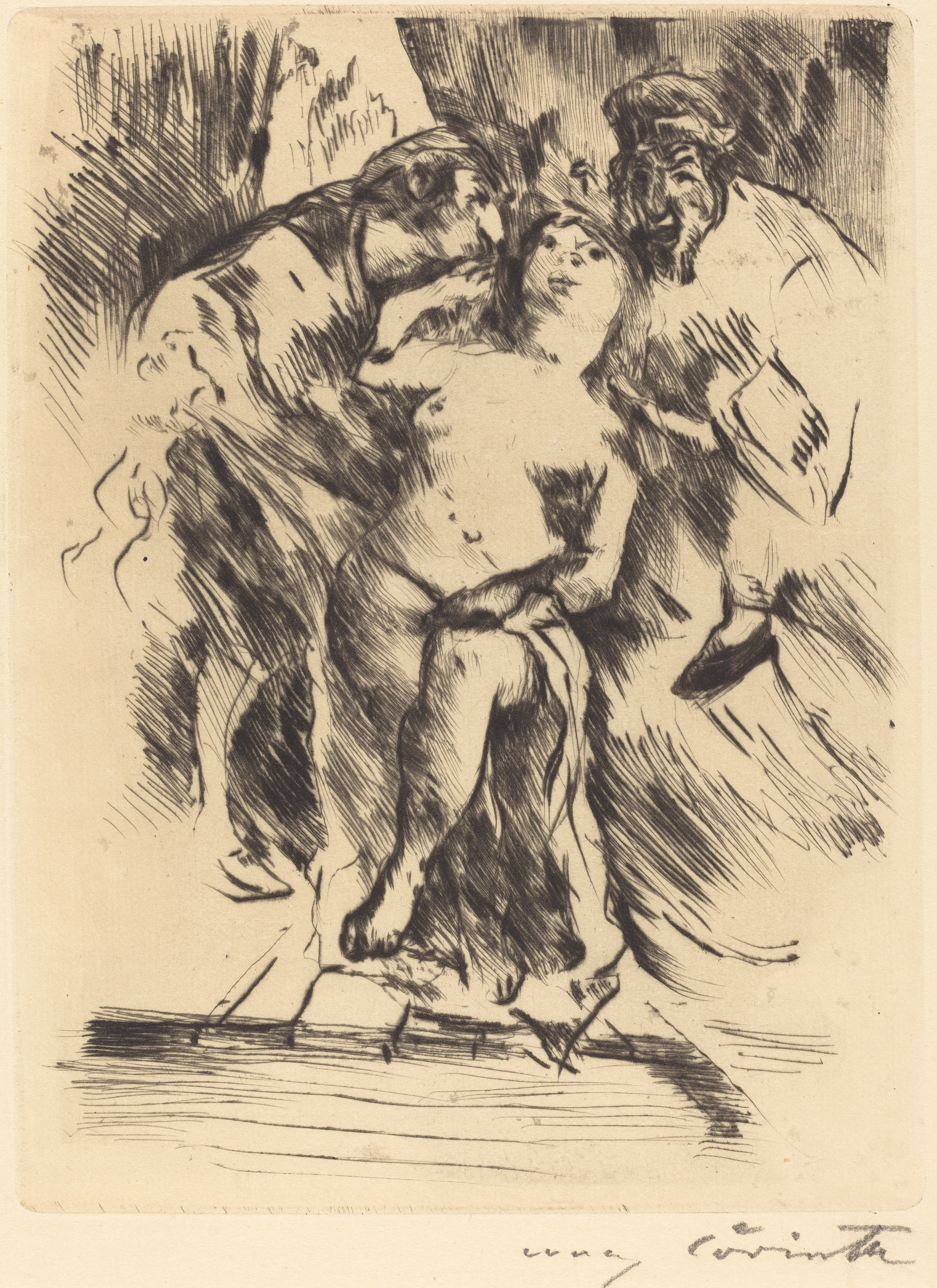
Massimo Stanzione: Susanna und die Ältesten, 1631–1637

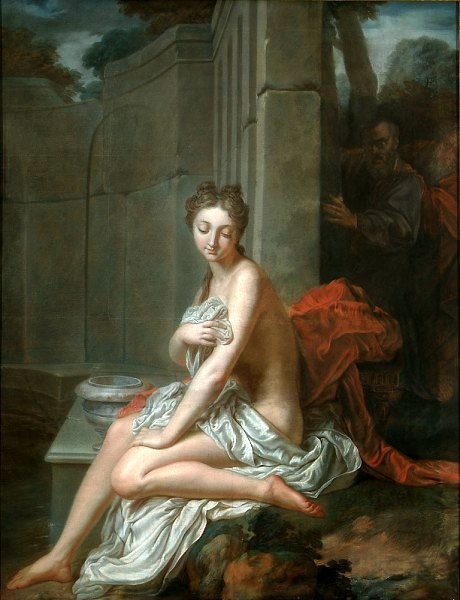
Jean-Baptiste Santerre: Susanna und die Ältesten, after 1704

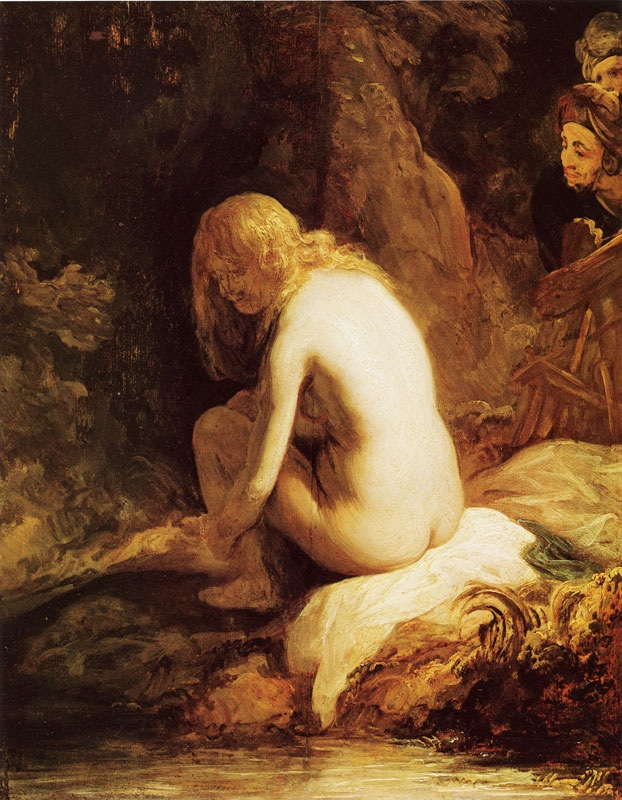
Rembrandt van Rijn: Susanna im Bade, around 1630

=== Naturalistic history painting ===
According to Bärnreuther's interpretation, "a deeper iconographic analysis is unnecessary" because the added accessories, including the heads of the ancients and the curtain, are incidental and anecdotal, creating an allusion to the subject. Corinth's approach aligns with the conventional rhetoric of the gaze, catering to the accustomed observer's perspective. While Corinth's early religious-themed works draw formal and compositional inspiration from diverse schools where he apprenticed, alongside lessons from the Old Masters, they are also infused with the influences of Naturalism. This artistic approach, deviating from the conventional 'scholarly painting,' had already emerged in Germany and France, notably through the likes of Jean-Auguste-Dominique Ingres and Anselm Feuerbach, and was further exemplified in naturalistic and realistic historical depictions as well as paintings rooted in literary models, as seen in the works of Gustave Courbet, Max Klinger, Lawrence Alma-Tadema, and Franz von Stuck. Corinth's art was also shaped by the legacy of the Old Masters.

Makela further observes that while the depiction of Susanna retains an idealized essence, it is distinctly grounded in realism. Corinth incorporates a selection of her traditional illustrative attributes. Moreover, as only one of the two leering old men is visible behind the curtain, 'Corinth's depiction operates on a secular as well as a religious level.' Here, a parallel is drawn with the Pietà, where the portrayal of the deceased Christ's body similarly adheres to a highly realistic and less idealized representation, shifting away from typical iconography such as the halo. The Pietà's depiction even prompted a reviewer to suggest changing its title from Beweinung Christi (Lamentation of Christ) to Beweinung eines Todten (Lamentation of a Dead Man).

=== Nudes ===
The naturalistic design of Corinth's paintings is particularly evident in his depictions of nudes, both in history paintings and in his nude portraits. According to Friedrich Gross, he owed his "reputation as a particularly sensual painter akin to Rubens [...] to his nudes, both the depictions of models and the figures of mythological and symbolic combination." In this pursuit, Corinth, similar to Manet and Klinger, stood in opposition to the prevailing academic standard of beauty in the 19th century. The depiction of women within Corinth's figure compositions often mirrors the patriarchal framework of bourgeois society, often portraying them as temptresses, self-surrenderers, or—as exemplified in the case of Susanna in Bade—oppressed figures. Corinth's paintings thereby also serve as a reflection of the patriarchal underpinnings within a capitalistic society.

In 1955, Gert von der Osten noted that Corinth's deeper engagement with nude painting commenced during his tenure at the Académie Julian. This period yielded numerous sketches and studies, although a significant large-scale nude painting on which he was working remains lost. As van der Osten observed, it was during this phase that Corinth initially infused the female form with a sense of a 'living breathing being,' a quality that would persist in his subsequent works. Van der Osten also suggested that Susanna im Bade, executed in Königsberg, could be aligned with the 'Paris Harvest.' He classified it as a subject on the border between 'history and moral image,' uniquely suited to 'facilitate Corinth's self-liberation.' While earlier works like Das Komplott and others retained strong Munich school influences, with Susanna im Bade for the first time, the anecdotal genre piece was transcended. This painting possesses 'little of the novelistic intensification' and avoids posed models. Likewise, it refrains from the excessive tension that Wilhelm Leibl had filled into his Wildschützen (Game shooters), a work culminating in tragic failure. Although Leibl had destroyed the mentioned artwork, Corinth had encountered it in Paris, an encounter serving as 'both a reminder and a warning' for him.

=== Voyeurism ===
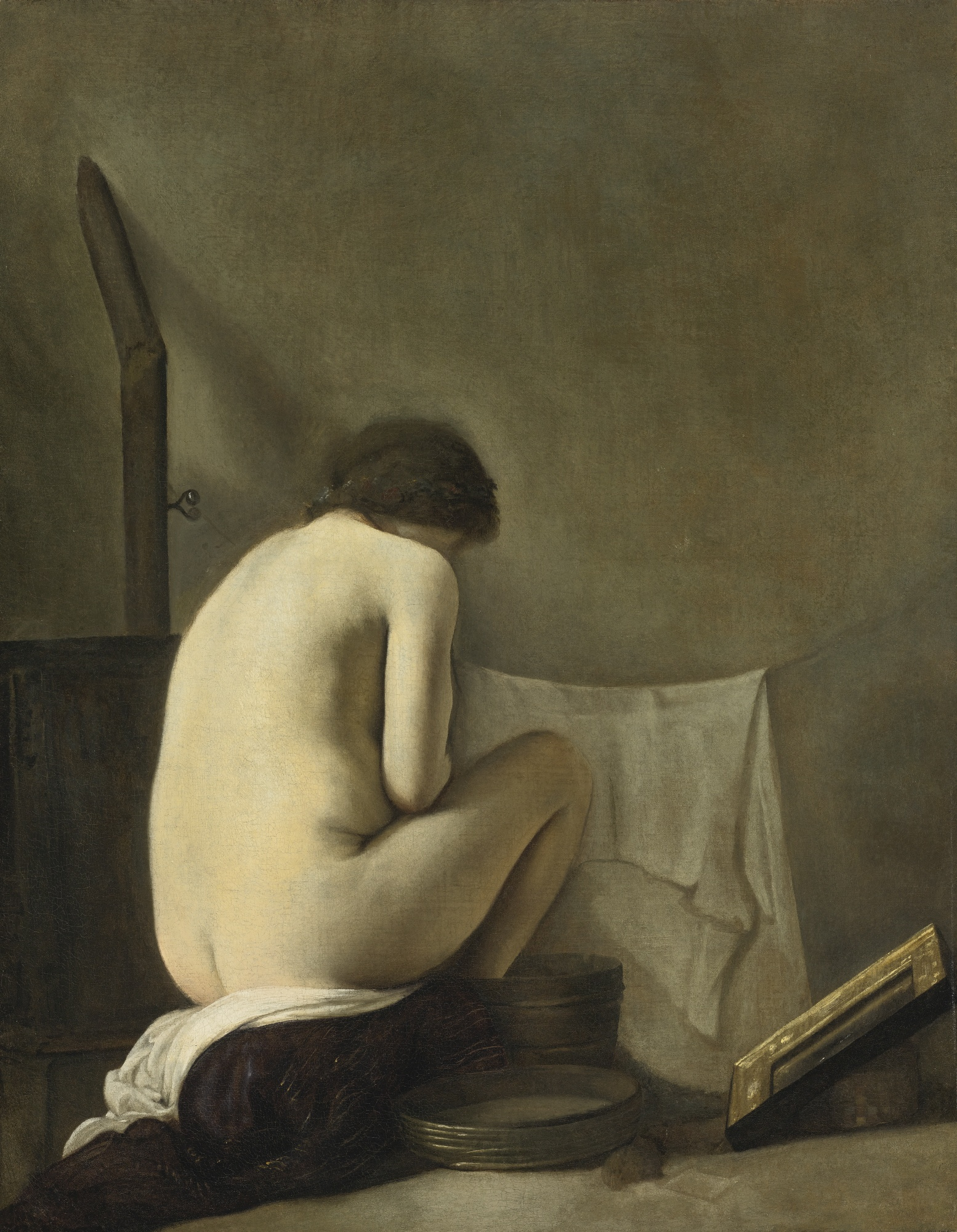
Paulus Bor, Sitzende Badende beim Ofen (1640s)

In his portrayal, Corinth chose a scene from the story where the two elders observe and eavesdrop on the woman in the intimate moment of the bath, hiding behind a curtain and remaining invisible to the sitter. By using his face, Corinth places himself in the position of voyeur. Several classical and contemporary models used the same scene as the basis for their interpretations of Susanna.

The voyeuristic scene is notably influenced by the woman being observed from behind, highlighted by the lighting. This technique is reminiscent of Rembrandt's portrayal of Susanna and can also be seen in works like Paulus Bor's Sitzenden Badenden beim Ofen (Seated Bathers by the Stove). According to Sevcik's insights from 2022, this choice of presenting the woman from behind conveys the illusion of her 'being unobserved,' thereby crafting an 'appealing mood' for the viewer. The outcome is a 'perspective crafted for the male gaze,' serving to ignite 'the possessive desire of the voyeur.'

== Provenance and exhibitions ==
=== Provenance ===
The provenance of the two paintings has not yet been systematically researched, or only partially.

According to Berend-Corinth's catalog raisonné, the first version of the painting was first privately owned by Alice Schurz in Wiesbaden and later in the art collection of the city of Königsberg. After that, the painting's location remained unknown (as of 1992), until it was sold at Koller Auctions in Switzerland in 2006. On November 3, 2015, another auction for the painting was held at Sotheby's in New York, with the painting's sale price estimated at $100,000 to $150,000; it was sold for $137,500.

For the second version, the catalog raisonné lists the owners without giving more specific dates. According to this, it was initially owned by the Berlin art dealer Ernst Zaeslein and went from there to a private owner in Breslau. It later went through Munich's Galerie Caspari, established by Georg Caspari in late 1913, before ultimately entering the possession of art collector Karl Wilhelm Zitzmann in Erlangen and from there to the collection of the art dealer Julius Stern in Düsseldorf. The last private owner of the painting was the family of the print shop owner and publisher Girardet, and since 1966 it has been in the collection of the Museum Folkwang in Essen through a donation by Wilhelm Girardet, the son of Wilhelm Girardet junior, where it is listed under inventory number G 349.

=== Exhibitions ===
Corinth's Susanna im Bade was submitted and exhibited in its first version at the Salon de Paris in 1891, but did not achieve the success of the painting Pietà exhibited the previous year and the "mention honorable." In 1893, the painting was shown first at the Great Berlin Art Exhibition, and second at the "Free Berlin Art Exhibition 1893" of the later Berlin Secession. In 1903 it was exhibited at Paul Cassirer's Gallery in Berlin and in 1913 at the Wimmer Gallery in Munich. In 1926, a year after Lovis Corinth's death, it was part of an exhibition at the Kunstverein Kassel as well as at the National Gallery in Berlin; the Kunstverein Dresden showed the painting in 1927 for the last time before the Nazi era and World War II.

After World War II, Susanna im Bade was shown at the Landesmuseum Hannover in 1950 and Wolfsburg in 1958. The Kunsthalle Köln exhibited the painting in 1976, and in 985 it was part of the Lovis Corinth 1858-1925 exhibition at the Museum Folkwang in Essen, as well as at the Hypo-Kulturstiftung in Munich, along with numerous other works. In 1992 it was shown at the Kunstforum Wien, and then at the Niedersächsisches Landesmuseum Hannover until early 1993. In 1996, it was part of an extensive retrospective of Lovis Corinth's work at the Nationalgalerie in Berlin, the Haus der Kunst in Munich, as well as the Tate Gallery in London, and the Saint Louis Art Museum. The painting was exhibited at the Museum Folkwang in Essen.

From October 2022 to February 2023, it was part of the exhibition Susanna - Images of a Woman from the Middle Ages to MeToo at the Wallraf-Richartz-Museum & Fondation Corboud in Cologne, along with numerous other artworks with motifs of the Susanna story.
