= Peter Gorschlüter =

German art historian

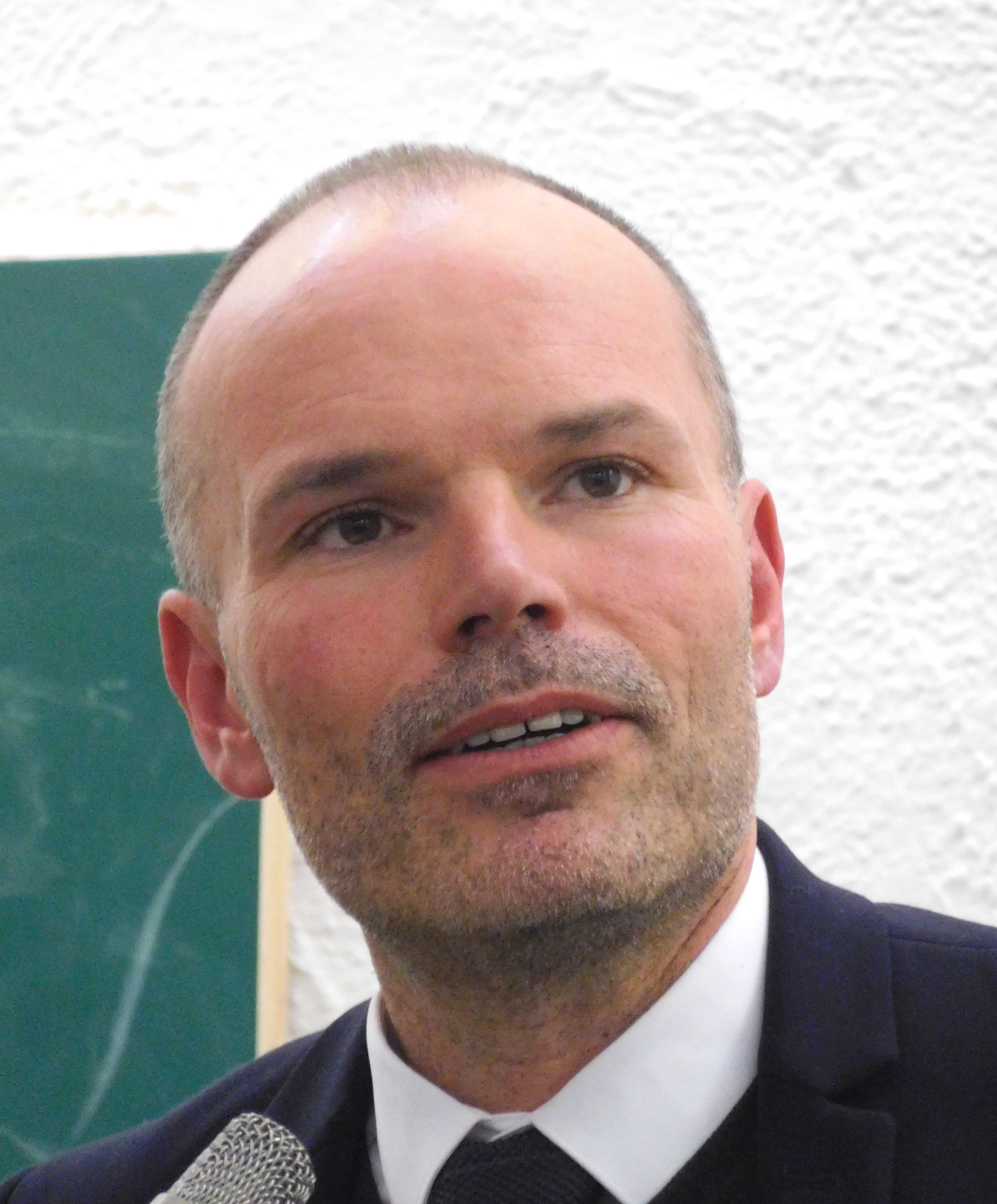
- Gorschlüter in 2018
- Born: 30 September 1974 (age 51); Mainz
- Occupation: Art historian
- Parents: Hans-Peter Gorschlüter; Vittoria Spani Molella

Peter Gorschlüter (born 30 September 1974 in Mainz) is a German art historian and curator. He was deputy director of the Museum für Moderne Kunst in Frankfurt am Main from 2010 to 2018 and has been director of the Museum Folkwang in Essen since July 1, 2018. In 2021 Gorschlüter was awarded an honorary professorship for "Art and the Public" at the Folkwang University of the Arts.

== Origin, education and studies ==
Peter Gorschlüter was born as the son of Hans-Peter Gorschlüter (1939–1992), head of the department of culture of the city of Koblenz, and Vittoria Spani Molella (* 1941), an Italian scholar of German studies. He is a German and Italian citizen. From 1994 to 1998 he studied theater, film and television studies at the University of Cologne, as well as German studies and philosophy. This was followed by studies in art history and media theory at the Hochschule für Gestaltung in Karlsruhe from 1998 to 2003. During his studies, he was a staff member of the Bonn Biennale '96 and '98 and worked as an assistant director. In Cologne, Gorschlüter curated exhibitions of works by young artists in private spaces.

== Controversy over Anaïs Duplan Exhibition ==
In November 2023, the director of Folkwang Museum, Peter Gorschlueter, sparked controversy by canceling an exhibition by artist Anaïs Duplan, a trans poet, curator, and artist. Gorschlueter cited activity on Instagram in his letter as the reason for the cancellation. The decision raised concerns internationally among artists about freedom of expression and censorship in the art community, part of a widespread rash of Censorship in Germany.

A representative of Folkwang stated: "“In autumn 2022, Museum Folkwang has invited Anaïs Duplan to curate a chapter on “Afrofuturism” for [the exhibition]. The curator, author and professor of literature, who lives in the US, has recognised expertise in this subject area. Since 18 October 2023, various posts relating to the current situation in Israel and Gaza have been shared and commented on by Duplan on the Instagram channel @an.duplan. On 10 November, a post appeared on this account calling for support for the BDS network. The German Bundestag has categorised this network as anti-Semitic.”

The artist Duplan refuted this statement's veracity publicly claiming there was no such post or reference to BDS.

== Professional career ==
From 1999 to 2001 Gorschlüter worked as an employee of the Karlsruhe gallery Meyer Riegger. In 2001 and 2002, he curated his own exhibition space there, "c/o Peter Gorschlüter," and showed exhibitions by Armin Boehm, Rosa Barba, and Zilla Leutenegger (30 Minuten vor Abfahrt), among others, as well as by Benita Liebel, Yasmin Müller, and Ulf Neumann and by Lee Taylor.

From 2002 to 2007 Peter Gorschlüter worked as curator and assistant director at the Kunsthalle Düsseldorf under Ulrike Groos. He curated exhibitions on art and music, e.g. in 2002 for the reopening of the Kunsthalle the exhibition "Back to Concrete - The Beginnings of Punk and New Wave". In 2007, he conceived the festival "düsseldorf sounds." In the same year, together with Groos, he curated a project with art in public space in Wuppertal entitled "SICHT WEISEN - Kunst auf der Talachse" [Ways of Viewing - Art on the Valley Axis]. Furthermore, he supervised solo exhibitions and publications on Blinky Palermo and Martin Honert at the Kunsthalle.

In 2005, Gorschlüter co-founded Passenger Books, a small publishing house that published books by artists David Shrigley, Simon Lewis, and Wilhelm Hein, among others. On January 1, 2008, Gorschlüter became chief curator of Tate Liverpool, heading the Exhibitions and Displays Department. He worked there with director Christoph Grunenberg primarily on the re-presentation of the collection. Within this framework, a collaboration developed with artist Michael Craig-Martin, film director Mike Figgis, and theater maker and author Tim Etchells. As head of exhibitions at Tate Liverpool, he was involved in major presentations on Gustav Klimt and Pablo Picasso, among others, and curated with Tanya Barson the exhibition "Afro Modern: Journeys through the Black Atlantic." In 2010 he was co-curator of the Liverpool Biennial.

== Museum director in Frankfurt am Main and Essen, teaching positions ==
On July 1, 2010, Gorschlüter became curator and deputy director at the MMK Museum für Moderne Kunst in Frankfurt am Main under Susanne Gaensheimer - succeeding Andreas Bee. From September 1 to December 31, 2017, he served as the museum's acting director. In 2012, Gorschlüter also co-founded the Triennale Ray Fotografieprojekte Frankfurt/RheinMain and co-curated its follow-up editions in 2015 and 2018.

From 2010 to 2018, Gorschlüter held a lectureship at the Institute of Art History in the field of study Curatorial Studies Theory-History-Criticism at Goethe University Frankfurt am Main / Städelschule Frankfurt am Main. From 2015 to 2018, he held another lectureship on Vergangenheitsdiskurs und Gegenwartskunst at the Department of Philosophy and Humanities at the University of Frankfurt am Main.

Gorschlüter has been chairman of the board of trustees of the Deutsche Börse Photography Foundation since 2015 and spokesperson for the RuhrKunstMuseen together with Regina Selter since 2020.

Since July 1, 2018, Peter Gorschlüter has succeeded Tobia Bezzola as director of the Museum Folkwang Essen. Under his leadership, the Museum Folkwang was named "Museum of the Year" in 2019 by the international art critics association AICA - German section.

== Publications by Peter Gorschlüter (selection) ==
- “Martin Kippenbergers The Happy End of Franz Kafka’s ‘Amerika’”, in: Museum Folkwang in Zusammenarbeit mit dem Estate of Martin Kippenberger (Ed.), Martin Kippenberger. The Happy End of Franz Kafka’s ‘Amerika’, exhibition catalogue Museum Folkwang, Köln 2021.
- with Victoria Noorthoorn et al. (Ed.), A Tale of Two Worlds. Experimentelle Kunst Lateinamerikas der 1940er- bis 80-er Jahre im Dialog mit der Sammlung des MMK, exhibition catalogue MMK Museum für Moderne Kunst und Museo de Arte Moderno de Buenos Aires, Bielefeld 2017.
- „Propose to Propose“, in: Stefanie Heraeus (Ed.), Hélio Oiticica. Curating the Penetráveis, Bielefeld 2016.
- „Through the Looking-Glass, and What I Found There. Places and Non-Places in Works by Fiona Tan“, in: Peter Gorschlüter et al. (Ed.), Fiona Tan. Geography of Time, exhibition catalogue, MMK Museum für Moderne Kunst et al., London 2015.
- with Susanne Gaensheimer (Ed.), Rineke Dijkstra. The Krazy House, Ausst.-Kat. MMK Museum für Moderne Kunst, Amsterdam 2013.
- „Making History“, in: RAY Fotografieprojekte Frankfurt/RheinMain (Ed.), Making History, Ostfildern 2012.
- „Introduction“, in: Lewis Biggs et al. (Hg.), Liverpool Biennial 2010. The Guide, exhibition catalogue Liverpool Biennial, Liverpool 2010.
- with Tanya Barson (Ed.), Afro Modern. Journeys Through The Black Atlantic, exhibition catalogue Tate Liverpool, London 2010.
- „Whose space is it anyway? Working on the Fifth Floor“, in: Peter Gorschlüter (Ed.), The Fifth Floor. Ideas Taking Space, exhibition catalogue, Tate Liverpool, Liverpool 2009.
- with Ulrike Groos, Thomas W. Rieger, Allen Ruppersberg (Ed.), Allen Ruppersberg. One of Many – Origins and Variants, exhibition catalogue, Kunsthalle Düsseldorf, Köln 2006.
- „Welcome Dilemma!“, in: Stefan Bidner, Thomas Feuerstein (Ed.), Plus ultra. Jenseits der Moderne?, exhibition catalogue, Kunstraum Innsbruck, Frankfurt am Main 2005.
- „The Gentle Art Of Making Enemies“, in: Peter Gorschlüter (Ed.), Armin Boehm. Paintball, exhibition catalogue, Meyer Riegger Galerie, Karlsruhe 2001.
- „Duty Free Jugoslavija“, in: Berliner Zeitung, Nr. 268, 16. November 1999.
- „Belgrad – Stadt der Geschichten“, in: SchauspielhausMagazin, Nr. 21, Deutsches Schauspielhaus, Hamburg 1998.
