= Museum Folkwang =

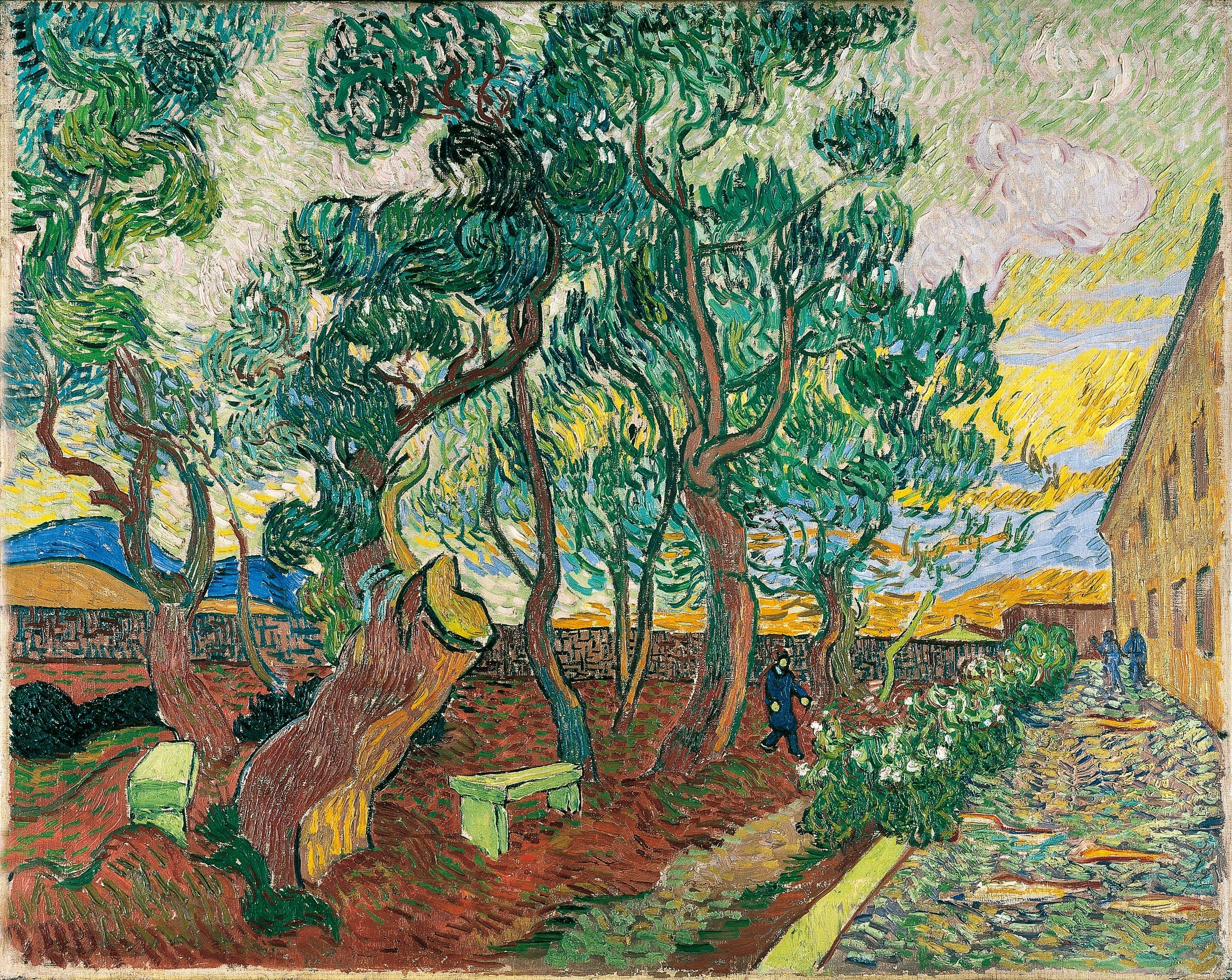
- The Garden of Saint-Paul Hospital by Vincent van Gogh
- Established: 9 July 1902
- Location: Essen, Germany
- Coordinates: 51°26′30″N 7°00′15″E
- Type: Modern art museum
- Key holdings: Mountain Landscape with Rainbow by Caspar David Friedrich
- Visitors: 800,000 in 2010
- Director: Peter Gorschlüter
- Public transit access: Essen Stadtbahn: U11 at Rüttenscheider Stern
- Website: museum-folkwang.de

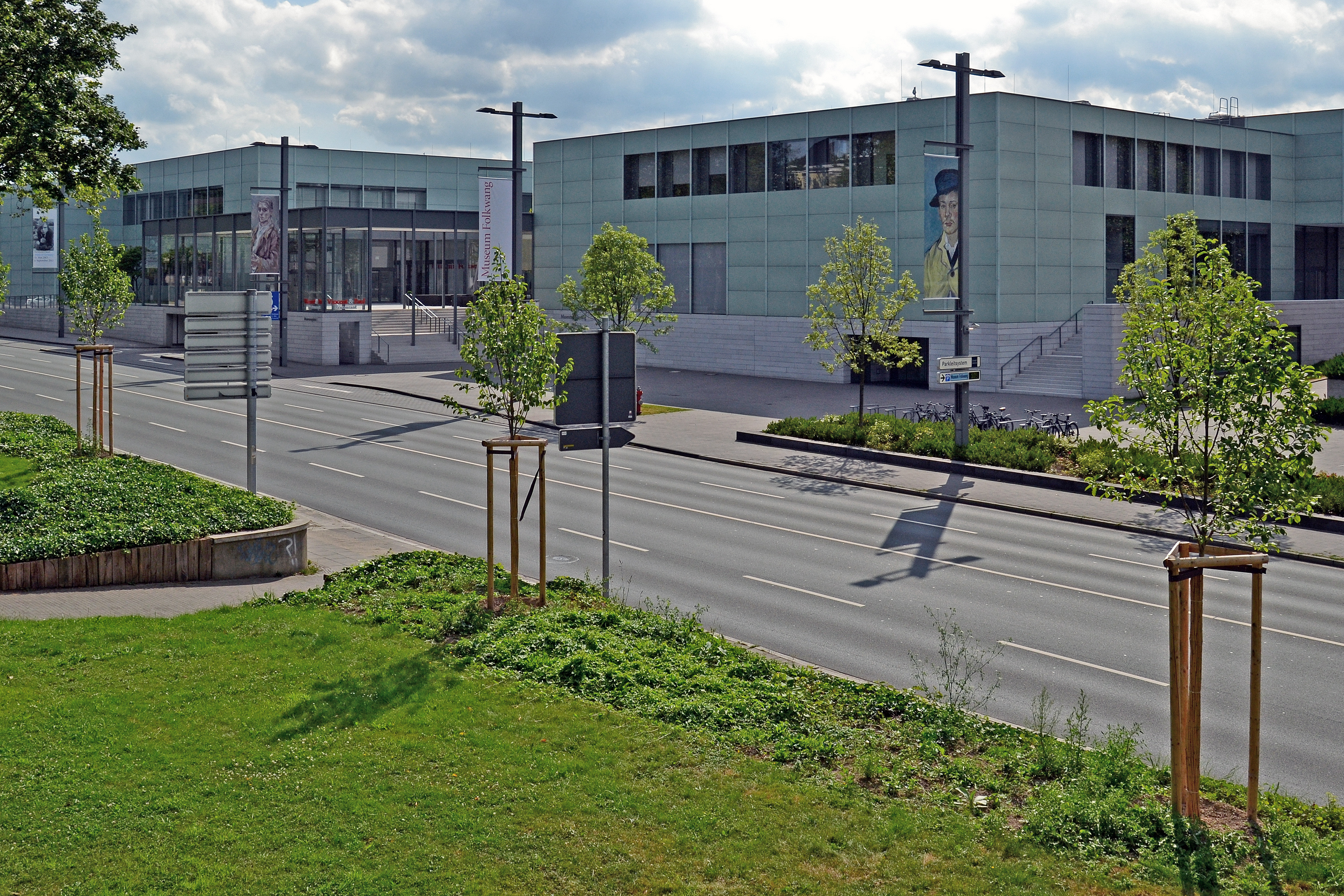
Exterior view of the museum, designed by British architect David Chipperfield (2010)

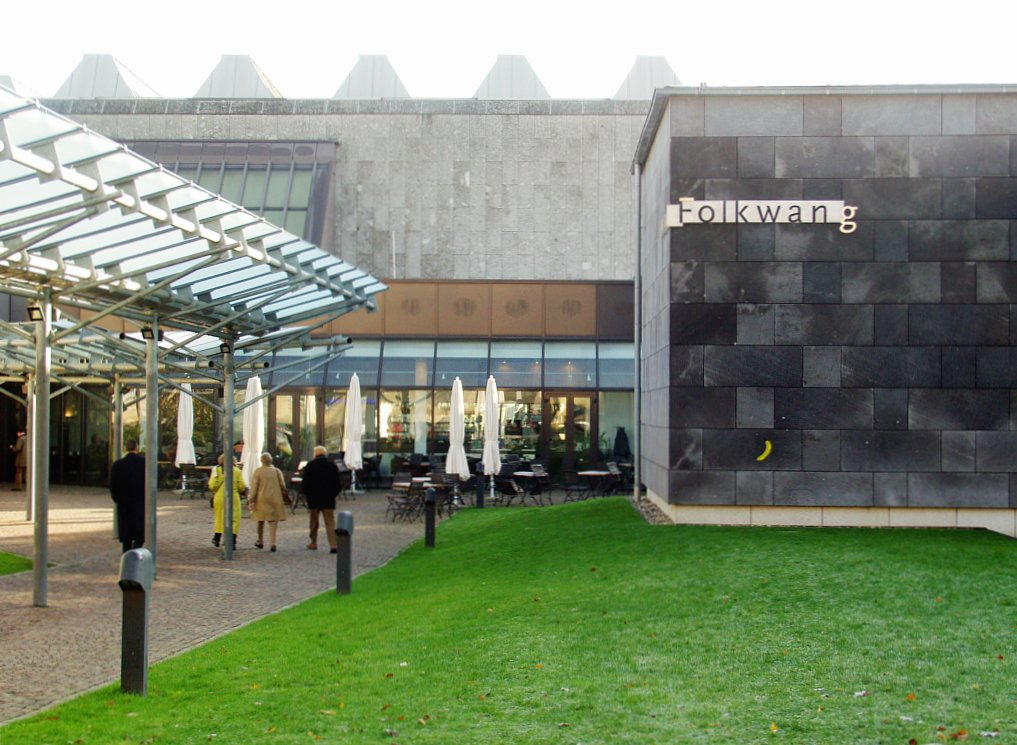
Exterior view of the old building (2004)

Museum Folkwang is a major collection of 19th- and 20th-century art in Essen, Germany. The museum was established in 1922 by merging the Essener Kunstmuseum, which was founded in 1906, and the private Folkwang Museum of the collector and patron Karl Ernst Osthaus in Hagen, founded in 1902.

The term Folkwang derives from the name of the afterlife meadow of the dead, Fólkvangr, presided over by the Norse goddess Freyja.

Museum Folkwang incorporates the Deutsche Plakat Museum (German poster museum), comprising circa 340,000 posters from politics, economy and culture. During a visit in Essen in 1932, Paul J. Sachs called the Folkwang "the most beautiful museum in the world."

In 2007, David Chipperfield designed an extension, which was built onto the older building.

== History ==
=== Museum Folkwang in the Nazi era ===
Ernst Gosebruch, director of the museum in the 1920s and 1930s, and earlier directors, had made the museum's collection of modern art into one of the leading collections in the world. However, when the Nazis came to power in Germany in the early 1930s, they instituted a government-wide purge of what they termed "degenerate art", by which they largely meant abstract, cubist, expressionist, surrealist and impressionist art. In 1937, Joseph Goebbels created a commission headed by Adolf Ziegler whose mission was to purge all German government-owned museums of such "degenerate" works. The Museum Folkwang fell into the category of government-controlled institutions and was therefore part of the purge. Over 1,200 works of art were removed from the museum (including those by Georges Braque, Paul Cézanne, Giorgio de Chirico, Henri-Edmond Cross, André Derain, Henri Matisse, and Edvard Munch, among others), part of over 17,000 works of art removed from museums throughout Germany. The Nazi government first organized a mass exhibition of this "degenerate" art—which, ironically, proved to be quite popular—and then began systematically selling the art to raise cash. Many works of art came into the possession of American and other collectors and museums. In the end, approximately 5,000 works of art deemed unsaleable were burned.

The Museum Folkwang and the other museums affected have generally not tried to reclaim these works because, at the time, the removal and sale of the works of art were legal under German law; the works of art were ultimately the property of the German government, which had the legal right to dispose of them as it saw fit.

=== Redesign ===
A €55m reconstruction was financed by the Alfried Krupp von Bohlen und Halbach Foundation under its chairman Berthold Beitz. An international architectural competition organized by the City of Essen was won by David Chipperfield (against competing designs by David Adjaye, Volker Staab, and Zaha Hadid) in March 2007. The new building, adding 16,000 square metres (170,000 sq ft) to the existing museum, opened in January 2010, when Essen and the Ruhr Area became European Capital of Culture – Ruhr.2010.

== Collections ==
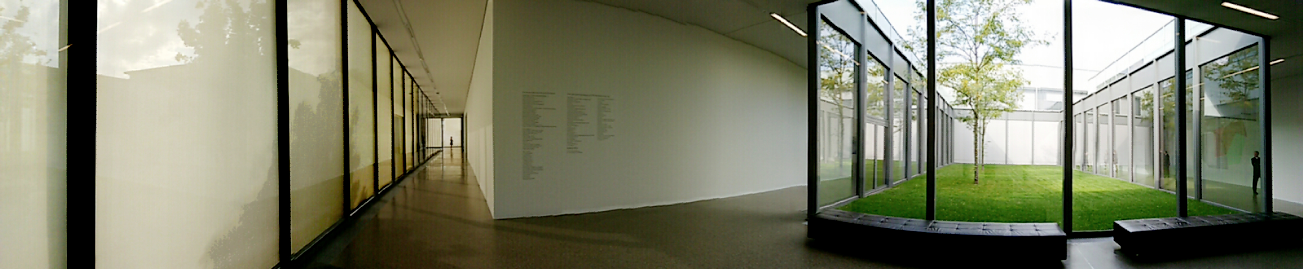
Interior view (2016)

The museum has collections on 19th and 20th century art, Modern art, Photography, Prints and drawings, German Posters, Ancient and Non-European art.

=== Photography ===
The photographic collection was established as an independent department in the Museum Folkwang in 1978; today it contains more than 50,000 photographs and a number of artists' estates. The Alfried Krupp von Bohlen und Halbach Foundation has been granting fellowships for contemporary German photography since 1982 in cooperation with the photographic collection of the Museum Folkwang.

The museum was the site of the seminal Fotografie der Gegenwart exhibition in 1929 at which the leading photographers of the time from Germany, Austria and France were represented.

The Museum Folkwang owns the copyright for the photographers Errell (Richard Levy), Germaine Krull, Helmar Lerski, Walter Peterhans, Fee Schlapper and Otto Steinert.

== Folkwang Museum Association ==
Folkwang Museum Association
- Folkwang Museumsverein
- Formation: 1 June 1922
- Founded at: Essen
- Location: Museumsplatz 1, 45128 Essen, Germany
- Members: 400
- Leader: Ulrich Blank
- Website: folkwang-museumsverein.de/en/

The museum is supported by the Folkwang Museumsverein e.V. (Folkwang Museum Association), a non-profit association of citizens, patrons and companies interested in art, founded on June 1, 1922. According to the statutes, its main aim is "to manage and expand the Folkwang Museum founded by Karl Ernst Osthaus together with the city of Essen and to make it permanently available for research and popular education purposes as a public collection". The association is based in Essen, where the Folkwang Museum has been located since October 1922. A special feature of the association compared to almost all other museum associations is that, together with the city of Essen, it is co-owner of the collections of the Folkwang Museum. The association publishes its own periodical for its members, the Folkwang newsletter. Its chairman since 2015 is Ulrich Blank.

=== Association purpose ===
The purpose and tasks of the Folkwang Museum Association are determined in its statutes as follows: "1. The purpose of the association is to manage, expand and public the Folkwang Museum founded by Dr. Karl Ernst Osthaus in Hagen together with the city of Essen 2. To make the collection permanently usable for the purposes of research and popular education. 2. In addition, the association has the general task of promoting the fine arts. 3. The association also has the task of maintaining and promoting the international status and character of the museum by supporting the work of the scientific staff in the field of teaching and research as well as all efforts of the museum for international cooperation in the artistic field." The purpose of the association determined in point 1 has been valid since 1922 (in the wording as quoted), the task of promoting the fine arts (analogously). The deliberate internationality of the museum and its activities was enshrined in the statutes only later, in fact it had existed from the beginning – only interrupted during the National Socialist era.

=== Bodies ===
The two governing bodies of the association are the board of directors elected by the general assembly (currently 14 members, at least seven according to the articles of association) and the executive board (currently six members). This is elected by the General Assembly on the proposal of the board of directors. In the early days, the board of directors had eight members (at least five according to the Articles of Association), while the executive board consisted of only three people, who at that time still had to belong to the board of directors.

Cooperation with the city of Essen and the heirs of Karl Osthaus as well as the supervision of the museum's operations take place in the board of trustees (Kuratorium) of the Museum Folkwang. It comprises up to 20 people, ten representatives of the city, five from the museum association and also up to five representatives from the Karl Ernst Osthaus Foundation, as well as the director of the museum (Peter Gorschlüter since 2018) as advisory member. The chair of the board of trustees changes annually between the mayor of Essen and the chairman of the museum association.

=== Membership and chairpersons ===
The Folkwang Museum Association has around 400 members, including legal entities (mostly companies). Its chairmen (since 1960 "first chairperson") were:

- 1922–1924: Friedrich Schöne
- 1925–1926: Ernst Henke
- 1926–1928: Oskar Ruperti
- 1928–1937: Hermann Seippel
- 1938–1959: Adalbert Colsman
- 1959–1969: Ernst Henke
- 1969–1985: Berthold von Bohlen und Halbach
- 1985–2000: Dietrich Oppenberg
- 2000–2005: Gerhard Cromme
- 2005–2010: Henner Puppel
- 2010–2015: Achim Middelschulte
- since 2015: Ulrich Blank

=== International Cooperation ===
With strong support of the Museum Association, the work of the Folkwang Museum became increasingly international from the beginning 1960s. Under the direction of Paul Vogt as museum director (in office since 1962), works from the Folkwang Collection were loaned to outstanding museums around the world. In addition, the FMV also began to cooperate more and more closely with museums in what was then the Eastern Bloc. The collaboration with museums in the USA was particularly close. In the early 1970s, works from the Folkwang Museum were loaned to partner museums in New York, Los Angeles, Chicago, Boston, Cleveland, Des Moines, Louisiana, Philadelphia, San Francisco and St. Louis.

=== Literature ===
- Folkwang-Museumsverein (Edit.): Sammlerfleiß und Stiftungswille. 90 Jahre Folkwang-Museumsverein – 90 Jahre Museum Folkwang [Collector's Diligence and Will to the Foundation. 90 Years of the Folkwang Museum Association – 90 Years of the Folkwang Museum], by Ulrike Laufer, 448p., Edition Folkwang / Steidl, Göttingen 2012, ISBN 978-3-86930-601-8. [A comprehensive account of the history and activities of the Folkwang Museum Association, published on the occasion of its ninetieth anniversary; in German.]
- Folkwang-Museumsverein (Edit.): Bilder für eine Sammlung. Museum Folkwang Essen. DuMont, Cologne 1994, ISBN 3-7701-3433-8.
- Tayfun Belgin, Christoph Dorsz (Edit.): Der Folkwang Impuls. Das Museum von 1902 bis heute. Neuer Folkwang Verlag, Hagen 2012.
- Andreas Lepik: Die Zurückführung der Kunst ins Leben: Karl Ernst Osthaus und das Museum Folkwang. In: Manet bis van Gogh, Hugo von Tschudi und der Kampf um die Moderne. Exhibition catalogue. Prestel, Berlin / München 1996, ISBN 3-7913-1748-2.

== Gallery ==
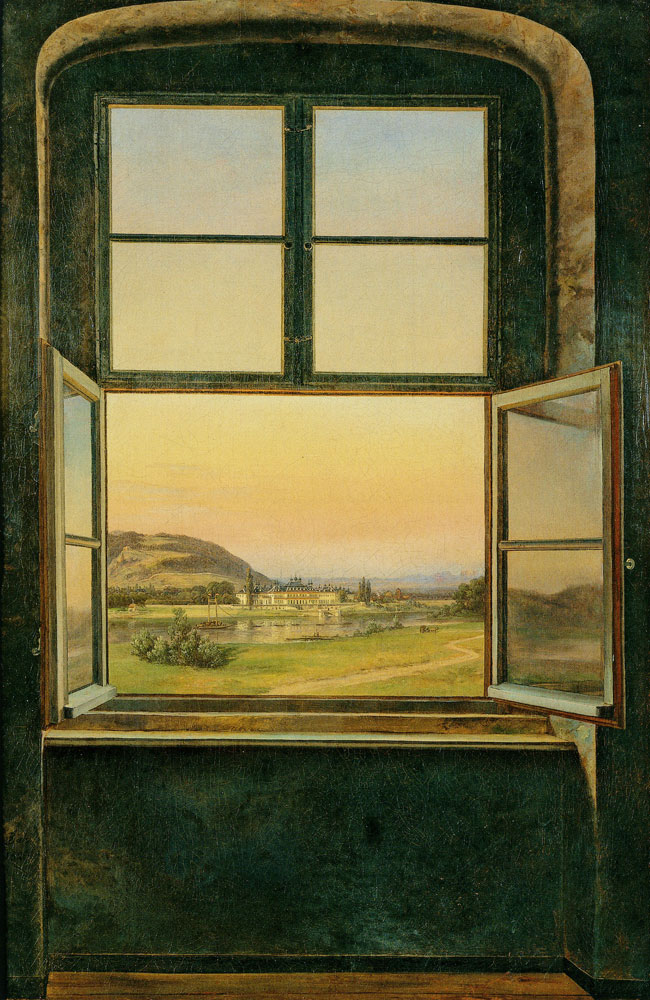
View of Pillnitz Castle by Johan Christian Dahl, 1823

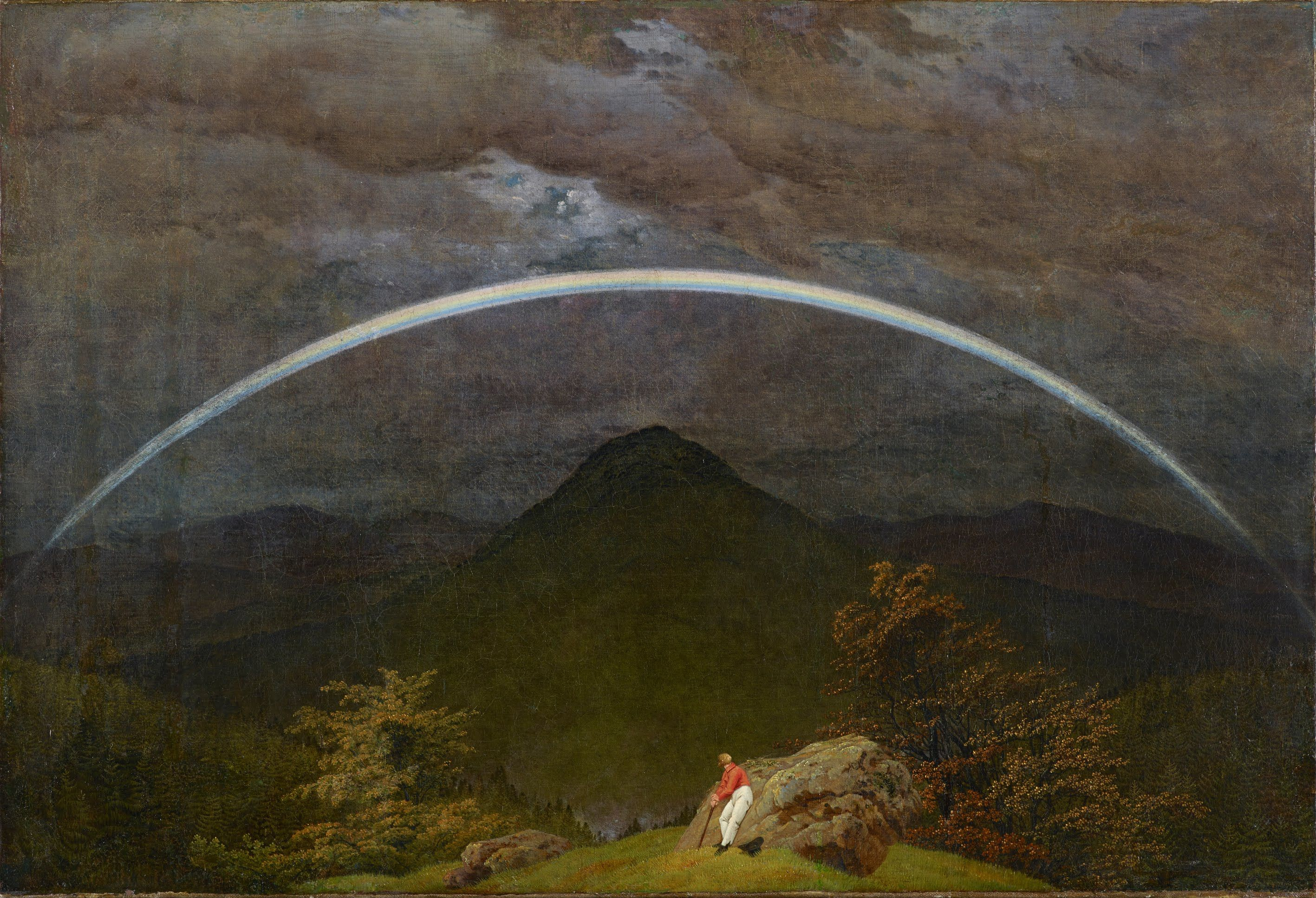
Caspar David Friedrich

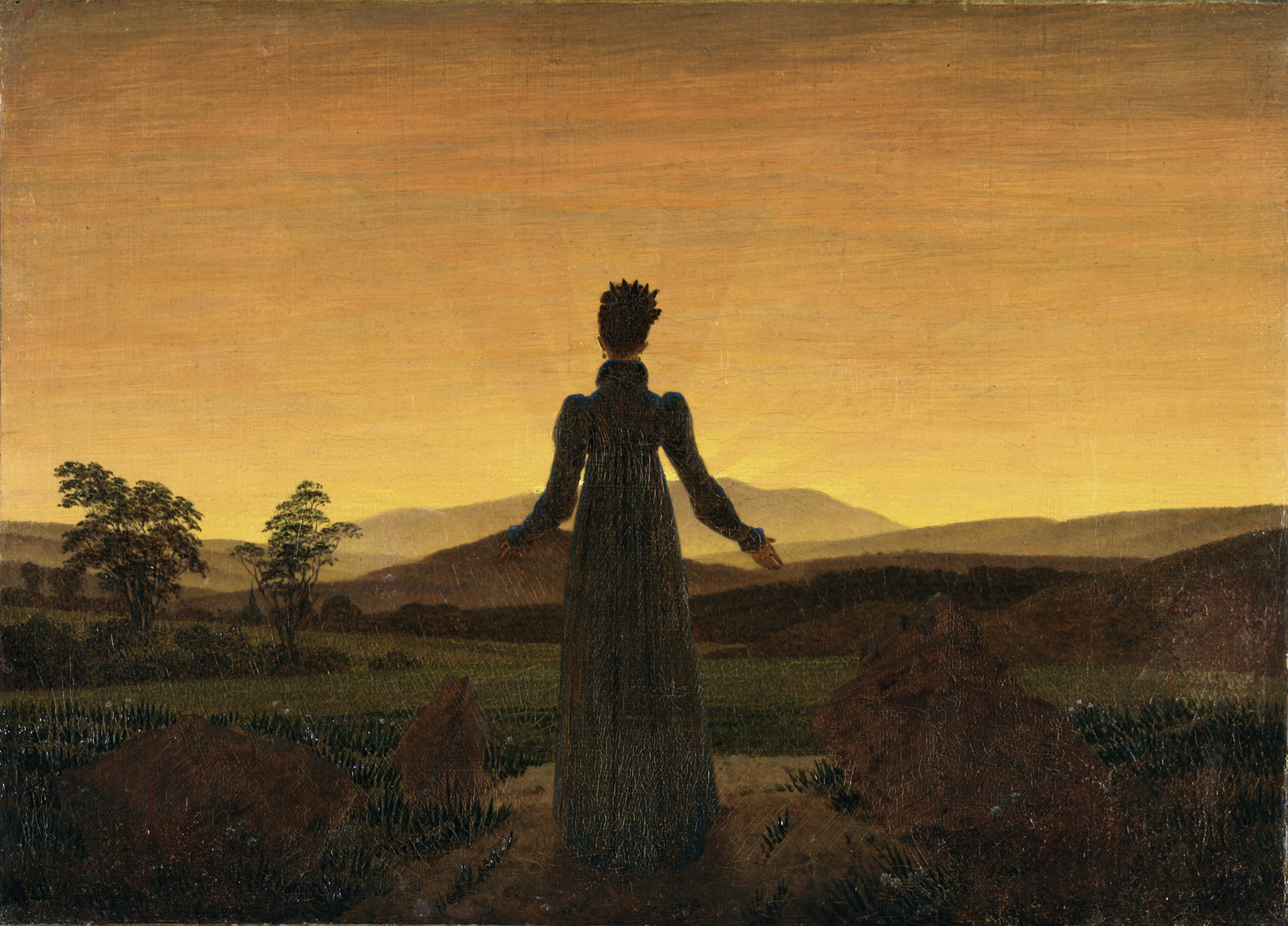
Caspar David Friedrich

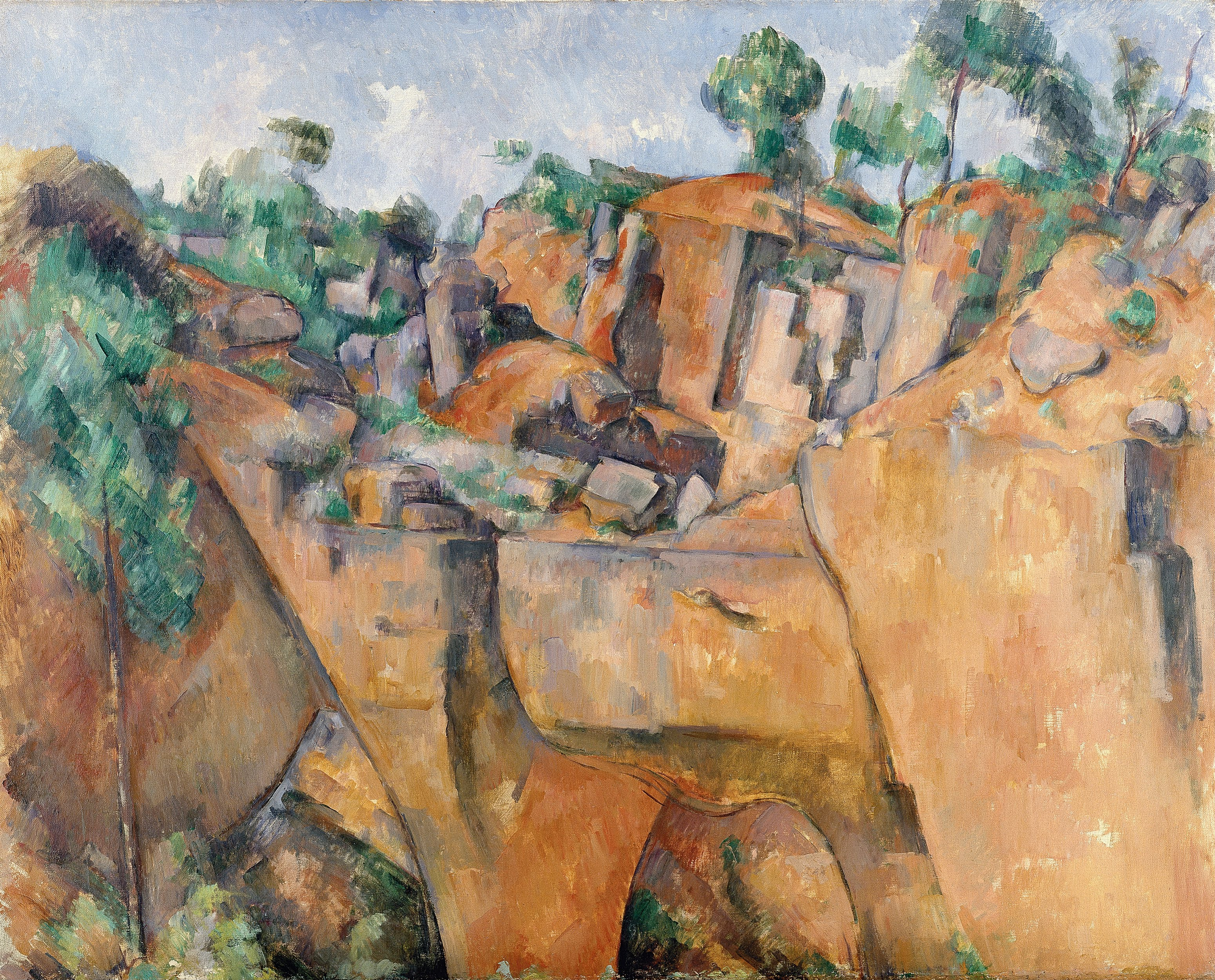
Paul Cézanne

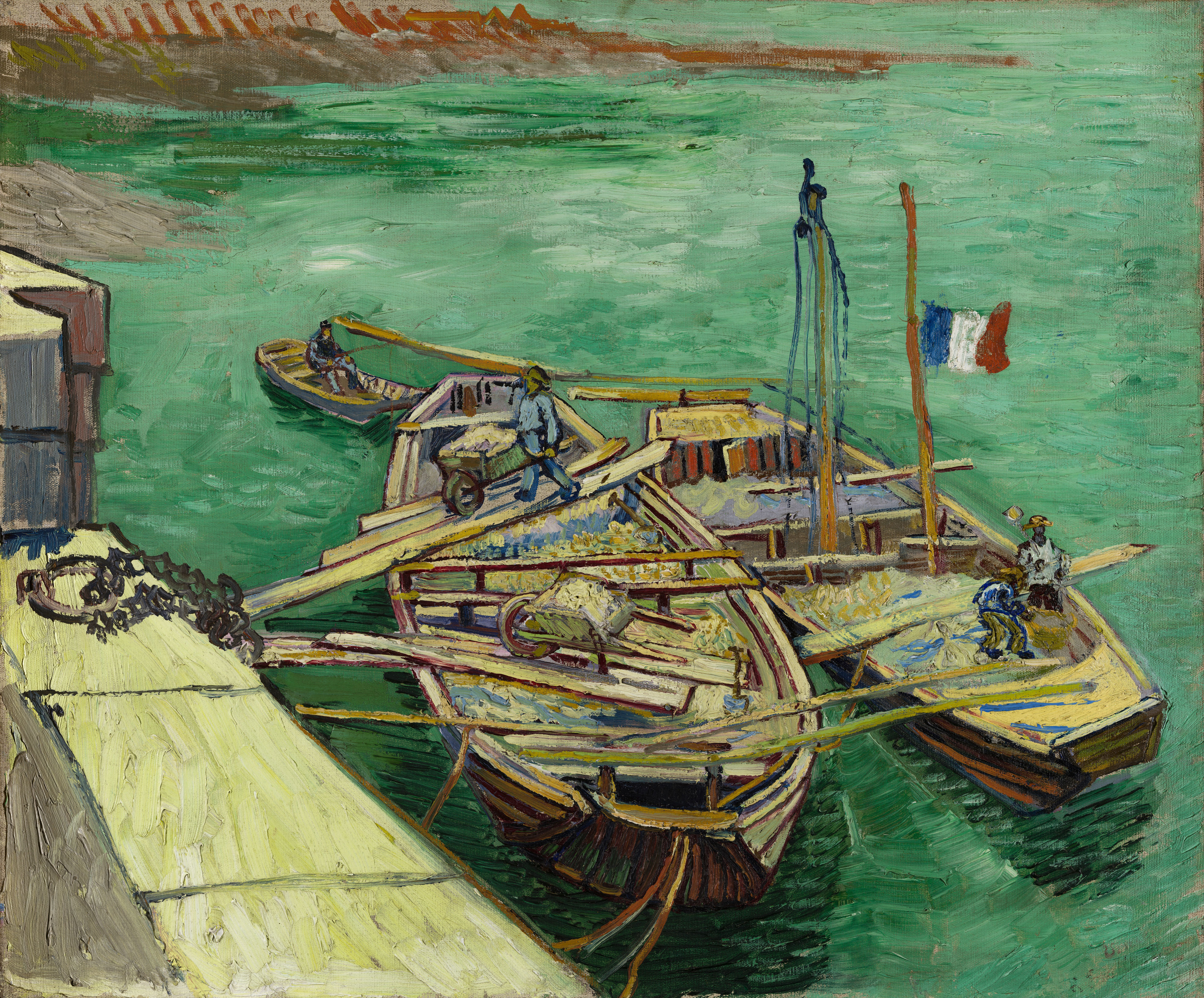
Vincent van Gogh

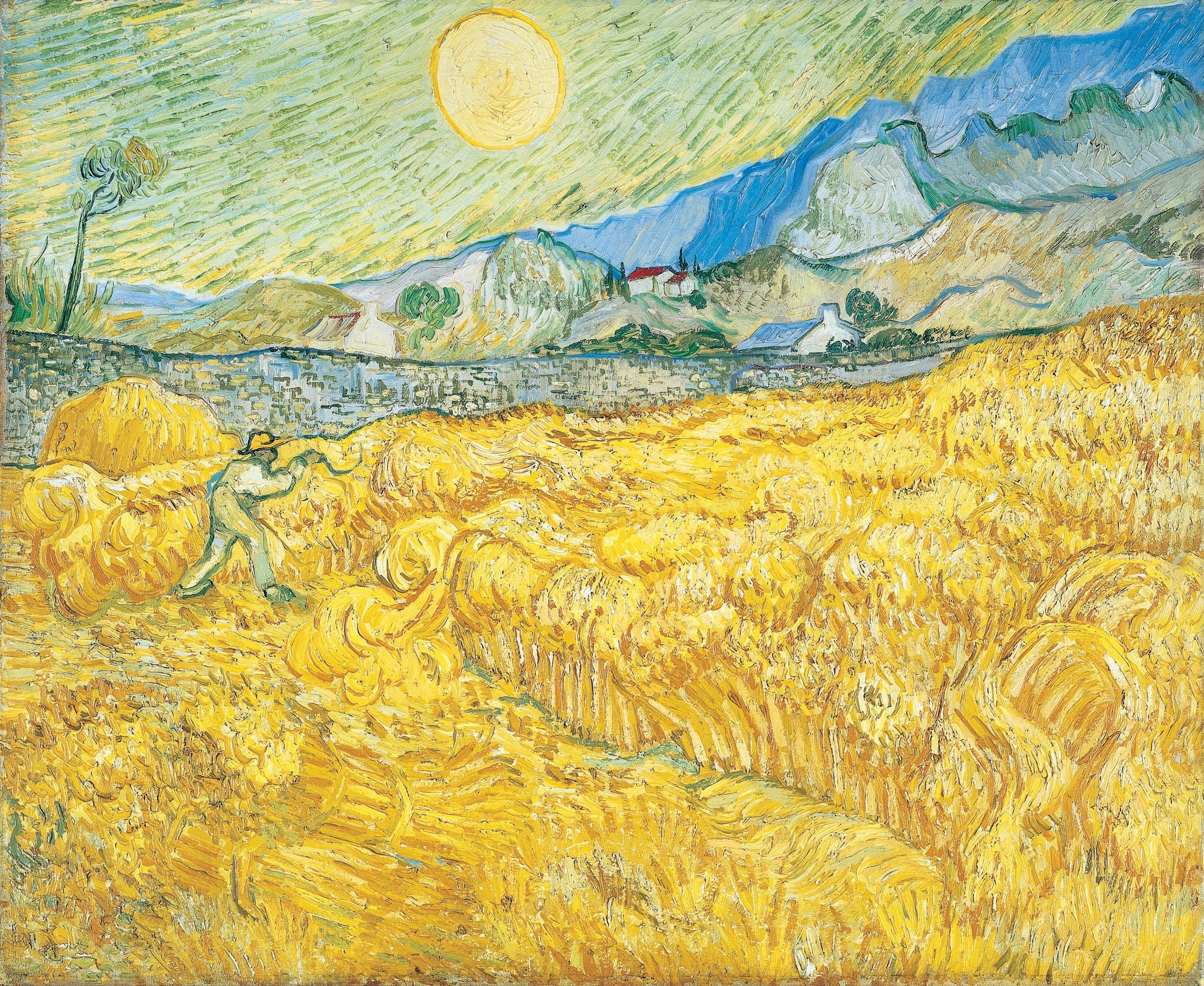
Vincent van Gogh
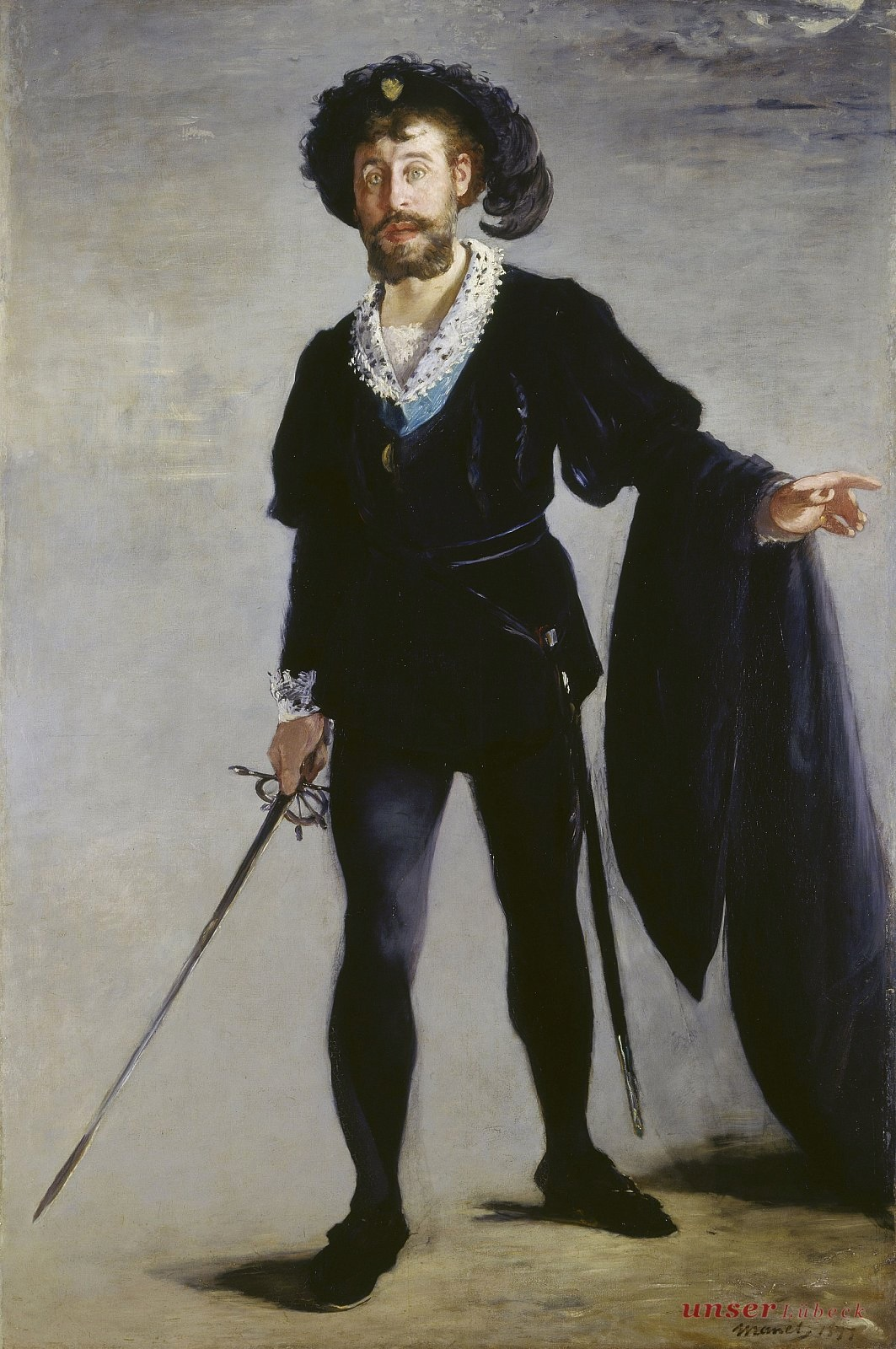
Édouard Manet

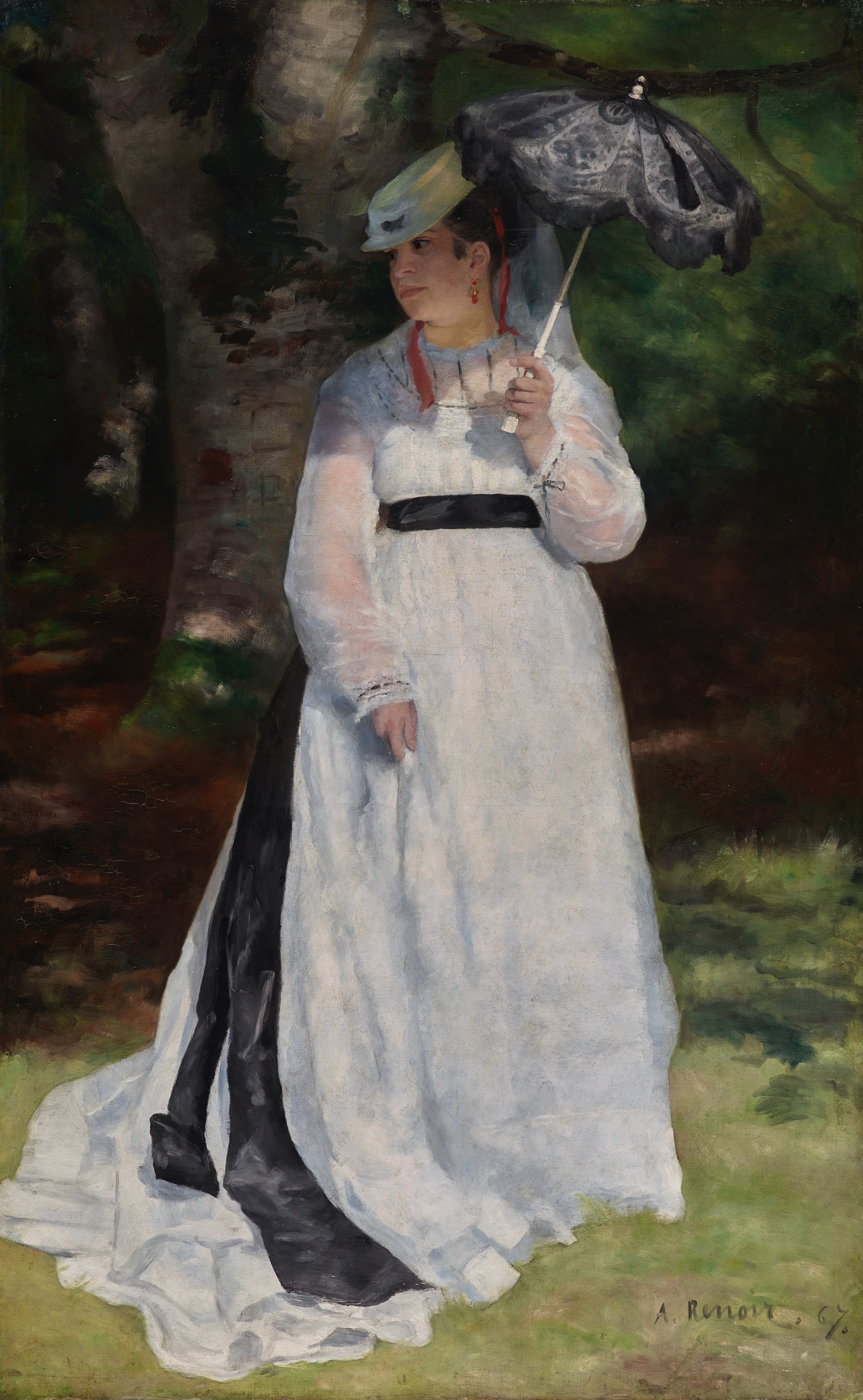
Pierre-Auguste Renoir

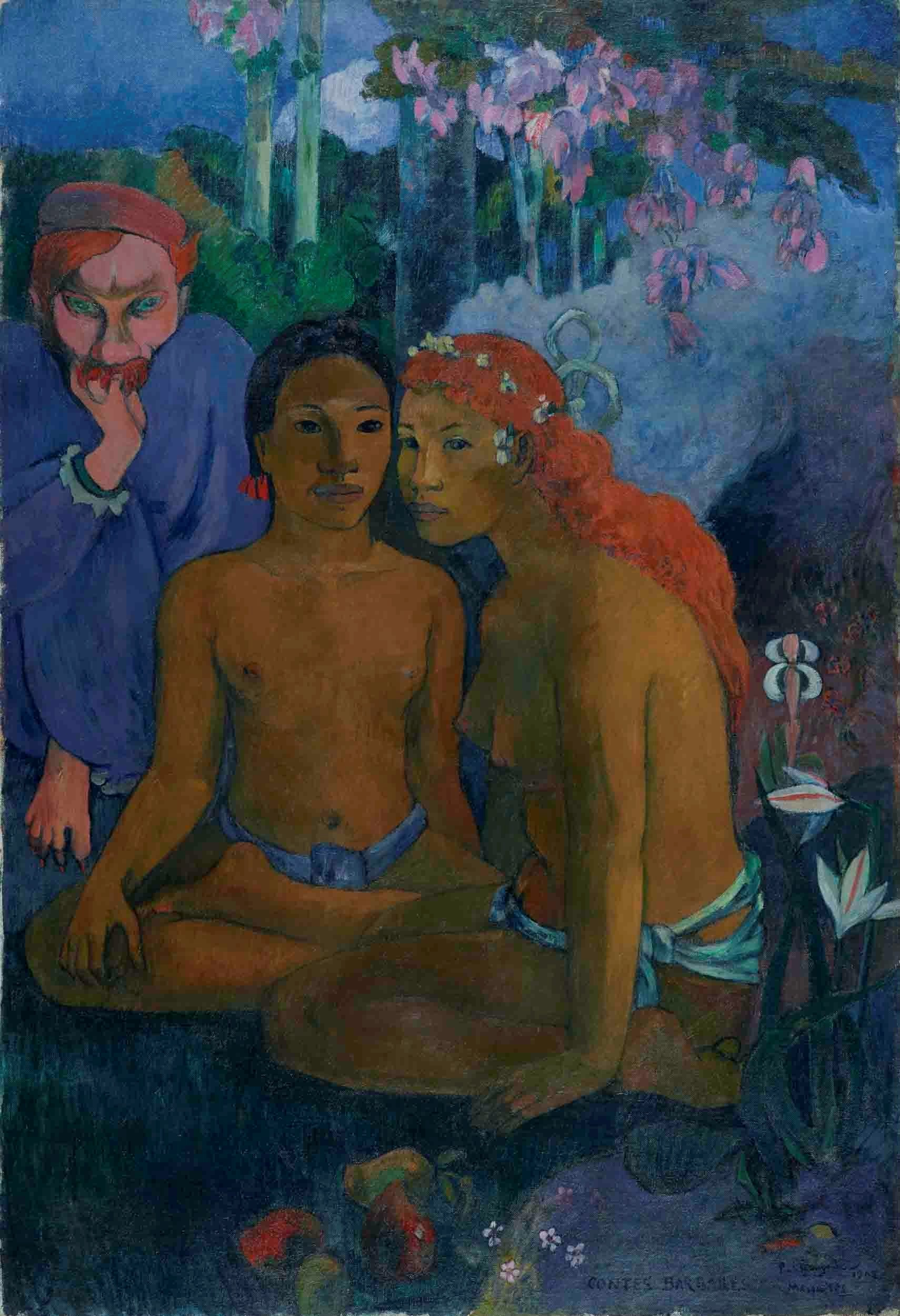
Paul Gauguin

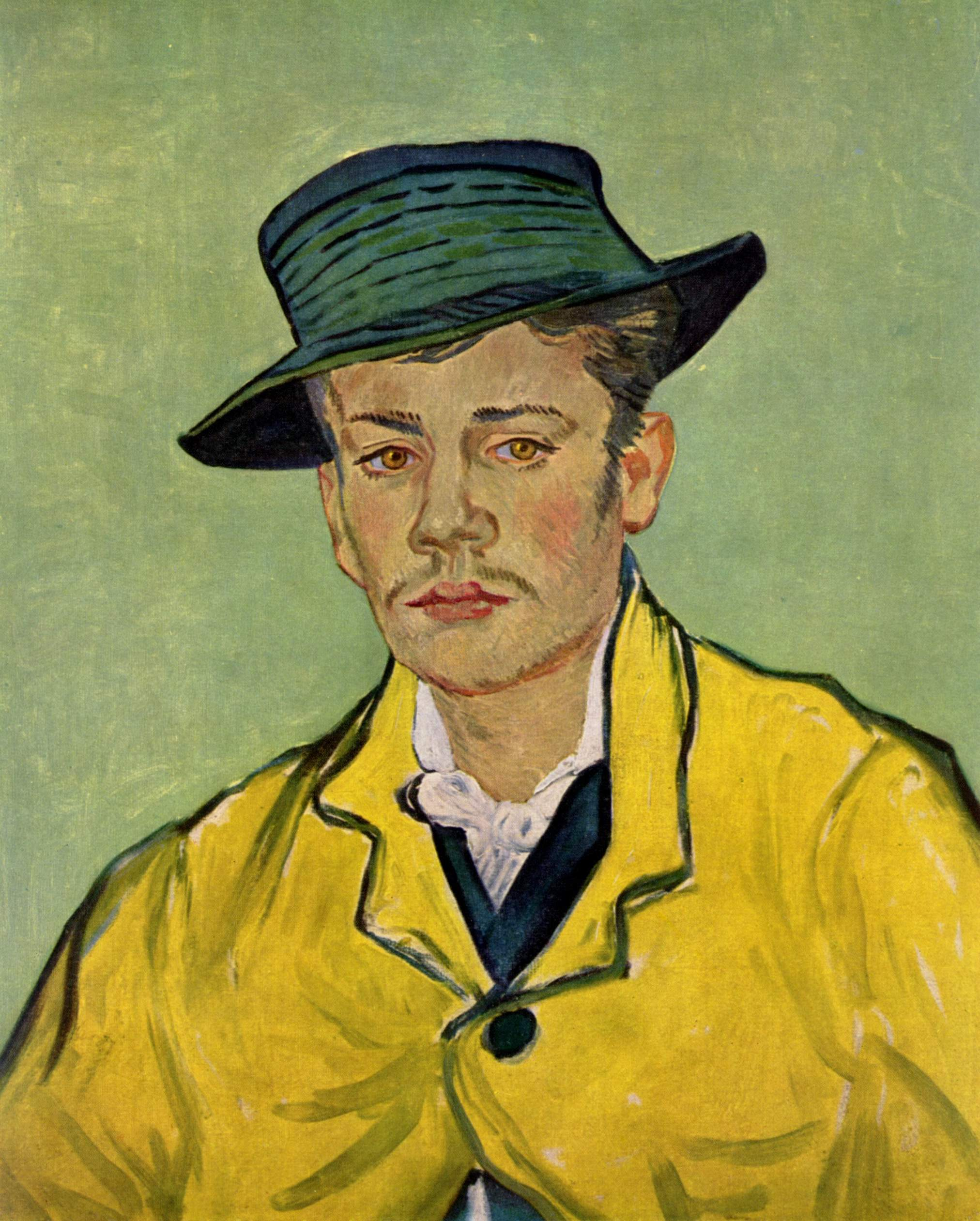
Vincent van Gogh

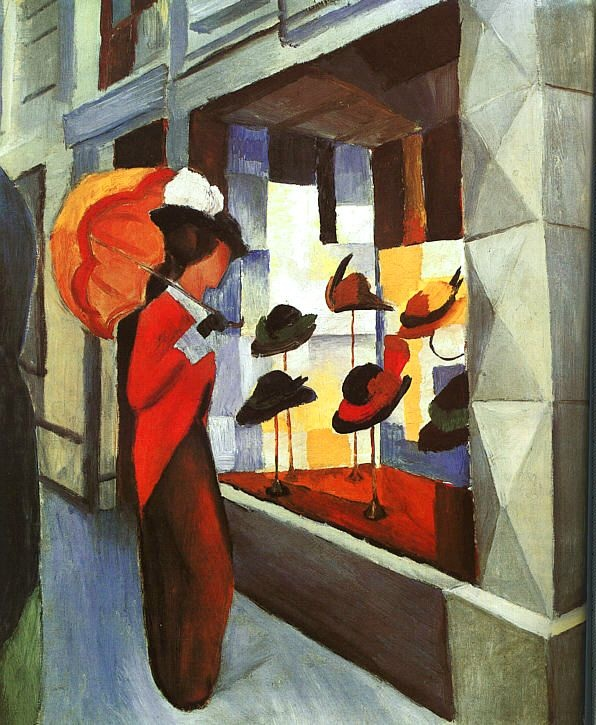
August Macke

== See also ==
- Susanna im Bade (Lovis Corinth)
