= Pöppelmann =

Pöppelmann refers to:

- 39464 Pöppelmann, a main belt asteroid with an orbital period of 3.79 years
- Matthäus Daniel Pöppelmann, a German master builder who was court architect for Augustus II the Strong
