= Vineyard Church (Dresden) =

Vineyard Church is a village church in Dresden

Coordinates: 51°00′41″N 13°52′42″E

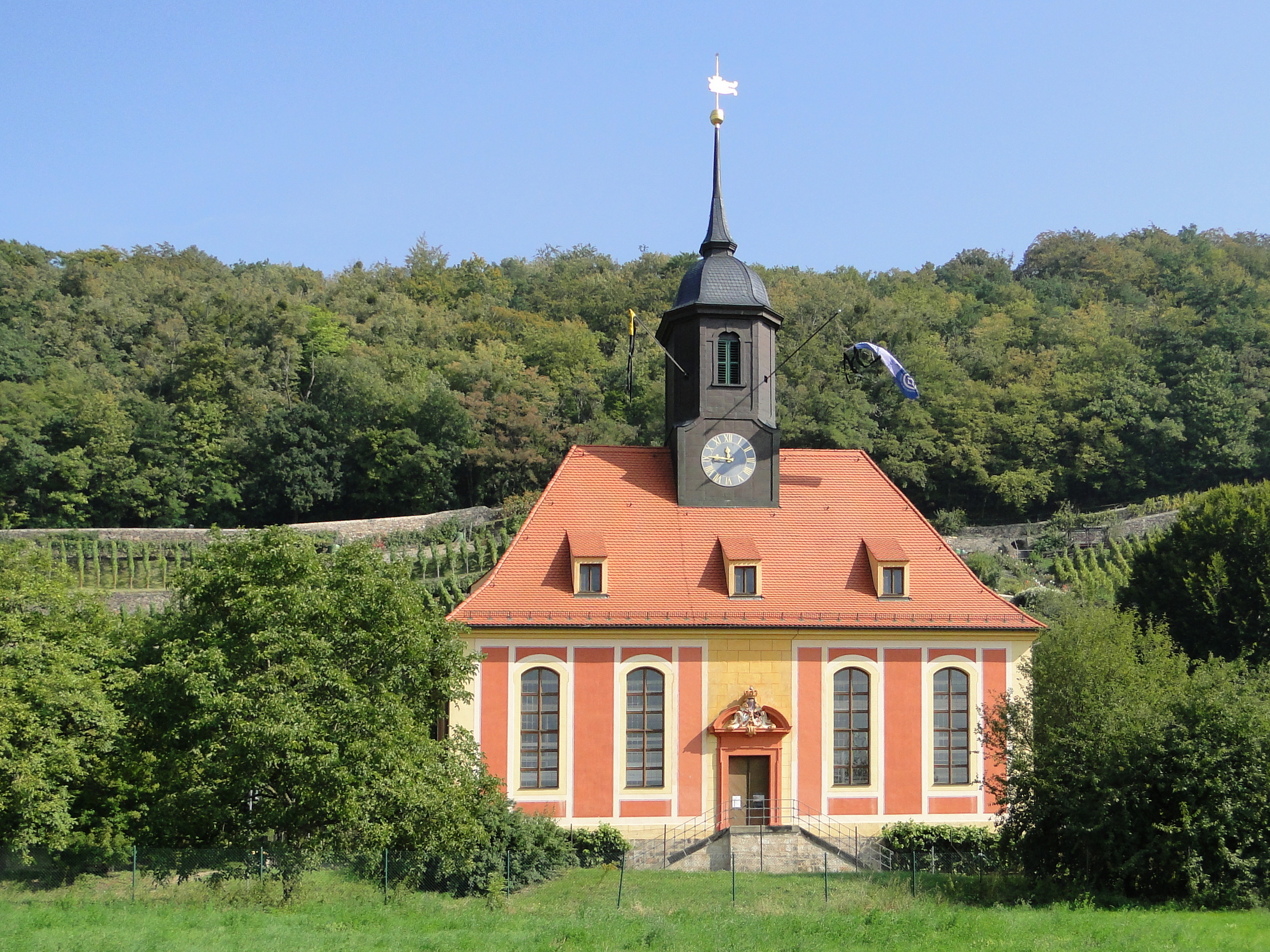
The Vineyard Church in Dresden-Pillnitz

The Protestant Vineyard Church "Zum Heiligen Geist" is a baroque village church in the Dresden district of Pillnitz, named after its location in the Royal Vineyard. It is not to be confused with the Vineyard Church built in the 20th century in the Trachenberge district of Dresden.

The Sacral architecture was built from 1723 as a replacement for the Pillnitz Palace, which was demolished for the expansion of Pillnitz Palace. It is the first executed church building by Matthäus Daniel Pöppelmann, the architect of the Dresden Zwinger, and is considered a "landmark of the Pillnitz landscape." The building, which had fallen into serious disrepair especially during the second part of the last century, was extensively restored in the 1990s. The vineyard church is under cultural heritage management and is part of the cultural landscape of the Dresden Elbe Valley.

== History ==
=== Previous building ===
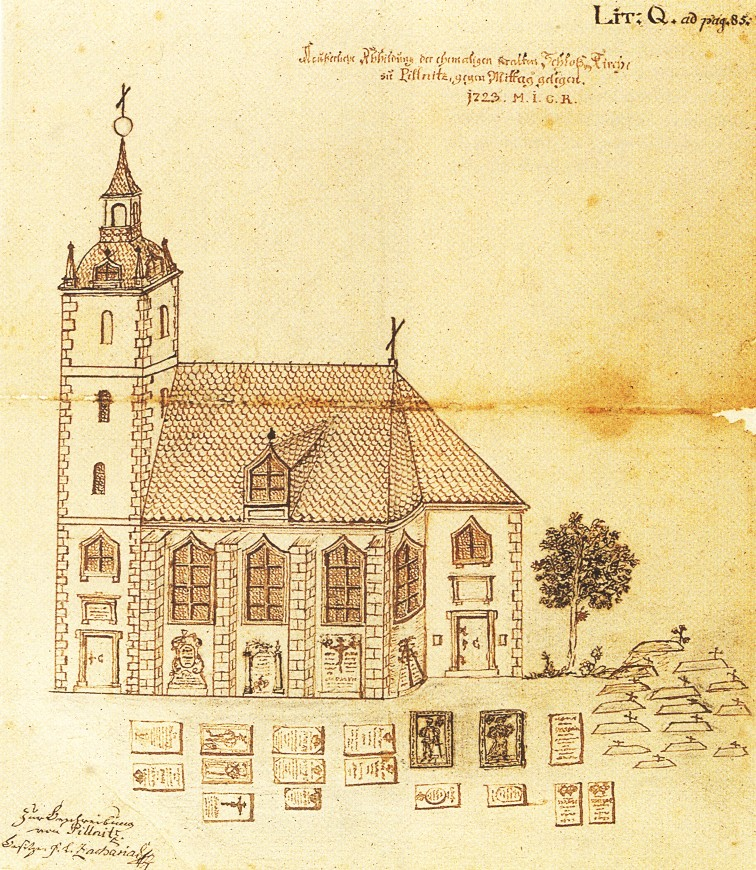
The old Pillnitz castle church before its demolition in 1723, drawing of the Hosterwitz and Pillnitz priest Johann Christoph Rüdinger

Pillnitz was parished to Hosterwitz since the beginning of the 16th century and formed the parish Hosterwitz-Pillnitz since the Reformation. For church services, the inhabitants of the village of Pillnitz went to the Schifferkirche Maria am Wasser. In 1569, Christoph von Loss (1548-1609), who later became the head prince of Elector Christian I and a court councillor, acquired the Pillnitz manor, which soon led to conflicts with the Hosterwitz parish priest. In 1579, Christoph von Loß approached the chief consistory of the Protestant church in Dresden to enforce the construction of an "independent private church as a place of worship and burial." The foundation stone for the so-called Pillnitz Palace Church "Zum Heiligen Geist" was laid on May 8, 1594. A late Gothic building with a 30-meter-high tower was erected and completed in 1596. The consecration of the first Pillnitz church was performed by the then Dresden superintendent Polykarp Leyser. The village of Pillnitz now formed a parish independent of Hosterwitz.

The founder Christoph von Loß died in 1609 and received a larger-than-life epitaph in the church. Other members of the von Loß family, such as Joachim von Loß († 1633) and his eldest daughter Sophie Sibylle Loß, married von Bünau († 1640), were also buried in the castle church. Sophie Sibylle's husband Günther von Bünau († 1659) and his second wife Elisabeth von Löser († 1649) donated the altar to the church in 1648 on the occasion of their marriage and the end of the Thirty Years' War. Under Günther von Bünau, the parishes of Hosterwitz and Pillnitz were reunited - both parishes still form the Evangelical Lutheran Parish of Dresden-Hosterwitz-Pillnitz.

In 1694, the Saxon Kurhaus received Pillnitz from Günther von Bünau's son Heinrich, who was granted Lichtenwalde in return. From 1707 Pillnitz was owned by Countess Constantia von Cosel, before construction of Pillnitz Palace began under Augustus the Strong from 1720 on the site where the palace church was located. The demolition of the church was only agreed to by the Higher Consistory of the Protestant Church in Dresden on the condition that a new church be built in Pillnitz. On May 11, 1723, Augustus the Strong, who had initially considered an extension of the church Maria am Wasser as an alternative, gave the order to build a new church on a plot of land in the royal vineyard. For this purpose, building materials as well as the altar, bells and organ of the old castle church were to be reused in the new church building. The construction costs of the new church in the amount of 2000 thalers were borne by the Saxon Chief Building Authority. The castle church "Zum Heiligen Geist" was demolished in May 1723. In its place was built the Venus Temple, a dining hall where portraits of court ladies and mistresses hung, which burned down in 1818. Today, the site of the former church would be between the New Palace and the "Lion's Head" on the Elbe River.

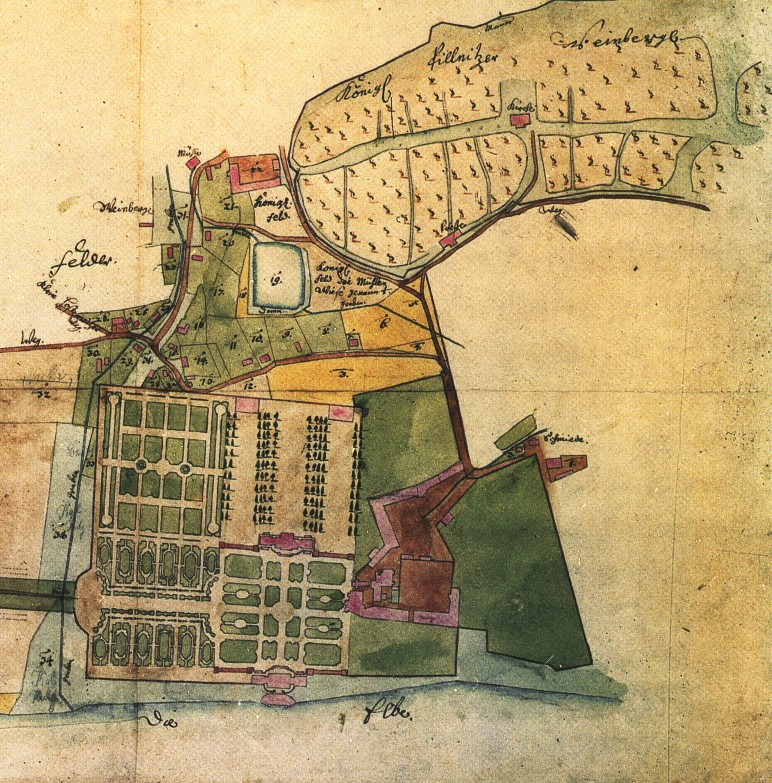
Location of the Vineyard Church in the Royal Vineyard above Pillnitz Palace, map from April 1725, in detail

=== Construction of the vineyard church ===
Augustus the Strong had instructed that "another [church] be built not far from the village on Weinbergs-Preße." The design was commissioned to the then Oberlandbaumeister Matthäus Daniel Pöppelmann, and Christoph Schumann, who had also worked on the reconstruction of Moritzburg Castle and the Japanese Palace, was in charge of the construction. The church was built on the site of a church in the village. In the presence of, among others, Valentin Ernst Löscher, August Christoph von Wackerbarth and sculptor Johann Benjamin Thomae, the foundation stone of the new vineyard church was laid on June 24, 1723, which was also called the New Castle Church "Zum Heiligen Geist" in reference to the previous building. The vines had been pulled in May, and in July the mortal remains were transferred from six crypts of the old church to the vaults of the new church, which had already been completed at the beginning of July. With the erection of the tower and the raising of the bells of the old castle church on Reformation Day 1723 - after only five months of construction - the exterior construction of the church was completed. The interior construction of the church lasted until 1725. The church consecration was on November 11, 1725. The Vineyard Church served as a place of worship for the Protestant members of the princely and royal court as well as for the community until 1918.

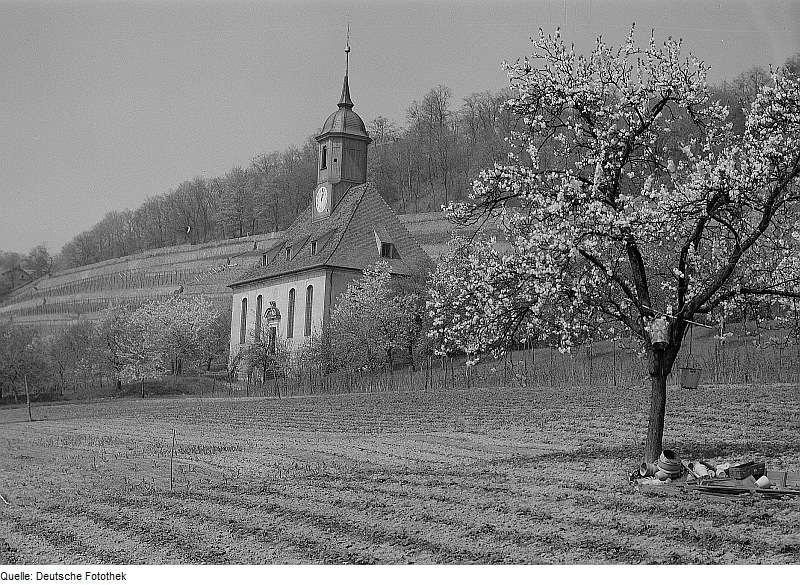
The Vineyard Church 1970

=== Vineyard Church until 1990 ===
In the 18th century there were reconstructions in the church. Smaller renovations to the roof truss took place in 1800 and 1839. During the first major reconstruction from 1852 to 1853, the pulpit was moved and the pews in the chancel were removed. In 1876 the church received the tower clock. The installation of a new organ in 1891 required a reconstruction of the western galleries with new side entrances. After the purchase of a stove to heat the church, the Vineyard Church received a chimney around 1900. In 1910, a new furnace was given another location. For the relocation of the furnace, the access to the sacristy had to be moved.

The maintenance of the church was in the hands of the Royal court until 1918, as the (Catholic) king had promised at the time of construction. With the end of the monarchy, the building passed to the state domain administration. When the Ministry of Finance and the Evangelical Lutheran Church finally agreed on a cost-sharing arrangement in 1930, roof repairs followed in 1932. Already at that time, the slow decay of part of the church was deplored, such as the location of the valuable grave monuments on the damp church walls and the faded colors of the church.

With the land reform in 1945, the Vineyard Church became the property of the Evangelical Lutheran Church of Saxony. The church was renovated in 1954, but increasingly fell into disrepair thereafter. Its use for worship ended in 1976, when it was deconsecrated for Thanksgiving. The regional church, which did not have the funds to maintain the church, requested that the building be transferred to the state. In addition to deterioration-related defects in the roof, windows and plastering, further damage had been caused by vandalism and theft. In 1983, after protracted negotiations, the church became the property of the city of Dresden, which established it as a legal entity under the Dresden museums united to form the Staatliche Kunstsammlungen Dresden. The church was partially secured and used for storage. It was not until after the fall of the Wall that the dilapidated Vineyard Church received more attention again.

=== Restoration and present use ===
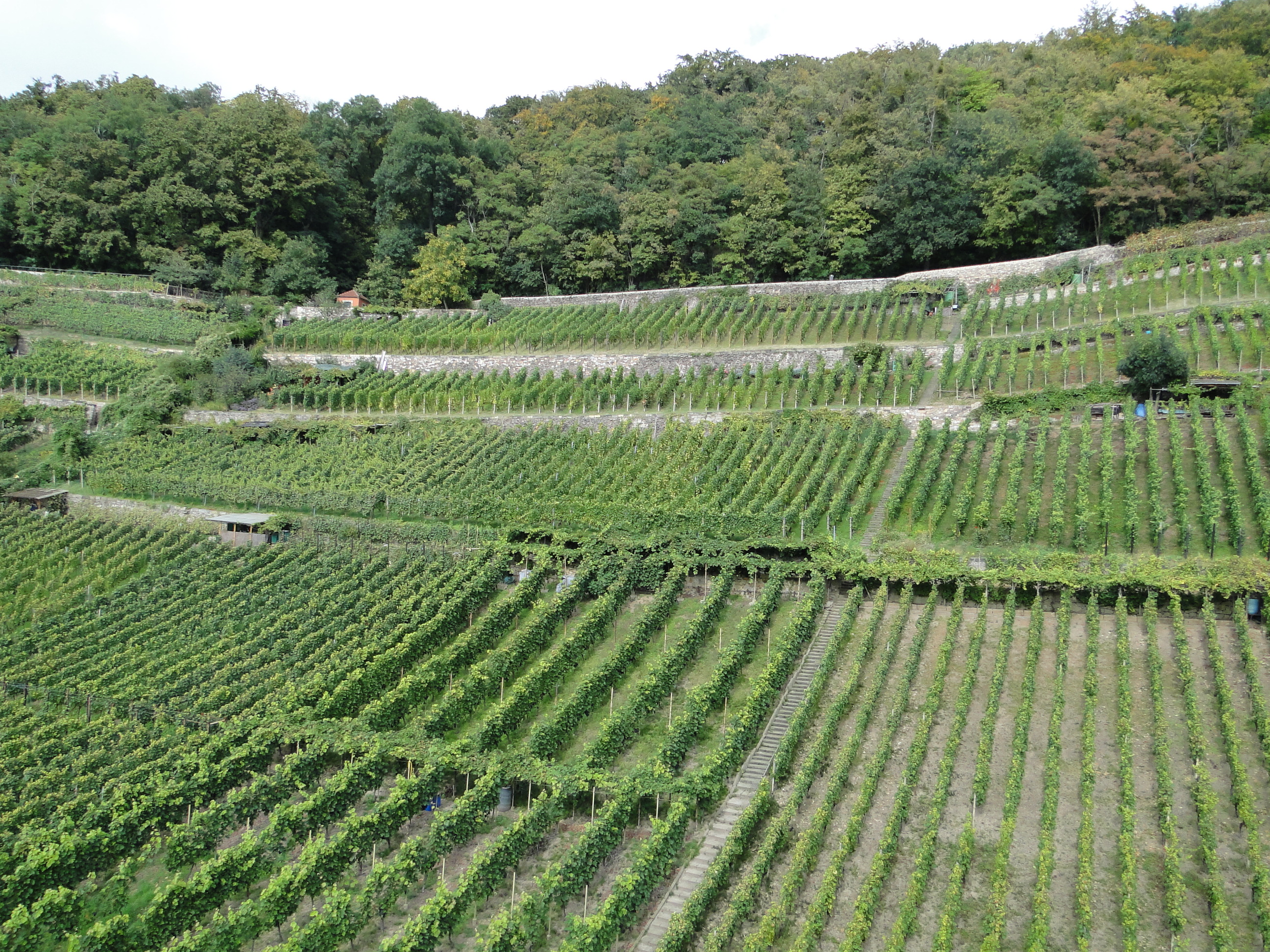
View of the Royal Vineyard from the bell tower of the Vineyard Church

In 1990, the Interessengemeinschaft Weinbergkirche Pillnitz e. V. was founded with the aim, among others, of collecting donations for the restoration of the church. For example, the community organized benefit concerts and solicited funding. In 1991, the first Elbhangfest under the title Von Bähr to Pöppelmann drew attention to the condition of both the Vineyard Church and the Loschwitz church, which was under reconstruction. In June 1991, the ridge turret of the Vineyard Church, which had been reconstructed with donations since November 1990, was handed over. In 1992, the roof was re-roofed and in the following year the exterior plaster of the church was renewed and painted illusionistically in red and yellow tones, in accordance with the original color scheme. The exterior color restoration was completed in 1993. In the same year the church became the property of the Free State of Saxony. In 1994, the efforts of the community of interest for the Pöppelmann building were awarded the Silbernen Halbkugel of the German Prize for Monument Protection.

This was followed by the restoration of the church interior, which was largely completed in 1995. The ceremonial handover of the restored church took place on November 12, 1995, and the consecration of the restored Jehmlich organ took place on the occasion of the Elbhang Festival in 1997.

Since then, some services of the Evangelical Lutheran Parish of Hosterwitz-Pillnitz have been held in the Vineyard Church again. Otherwise, the church is mainly used for weddings, concerts and exhibitions. Every year there is a spring festival around the church, a wine festival in October and a Christmas market on the third Sunday of Advent. The vineyard church is also a "landscape-bound structure." It is located as a colorful eye-catcher in the Great Royal Vineyard. which has been almost completely replanted since 1976. Since the 1990s, Müller-Thurgau, Traminer, and Pinot Blanc, among others, have been grown there.

== Specifications ==
=== First draft ===
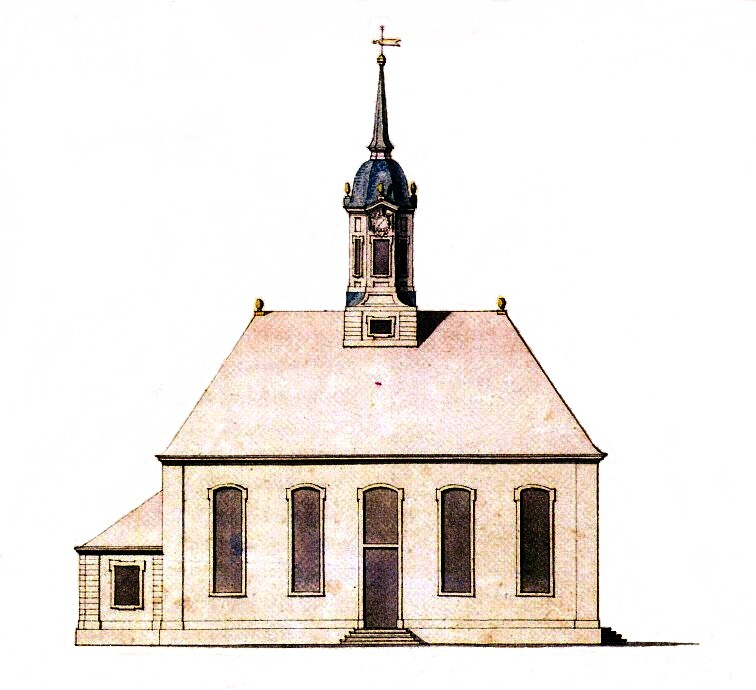
Pöppelmann's design around 1723

The Vineyard Church was "Pöppelmann's earliest executed church building." He initially designed a building for a level site, "probably even in the flood plain of the Elbe, since he place(s) four steps in front of the entrances." In the first draft, the sacristy was connected to the altar area and was located on the narrow - in relation to the executed building - east side of the church. Opposite the altar, Pöppelmann planned a narrow organ gallery. In the completed building, the sacristy was built into the slope on the northern long side of the church, whereas the main portal was located on the south side instead of the north. Pöppelmann planned a richly decorated ridge turret, which was eventually executed in a simpler form. During the renovation of the Vineyard Church in the 1990s, there was also discussion about a color scheme for the tower facade, but it was finally covered with copper in 1992.

The realized church type was subsequently implemented in other Saxon church buildings, such as the church in Rammenau and the one in Röhrsdorf near Pirna.

=== Exterior ===
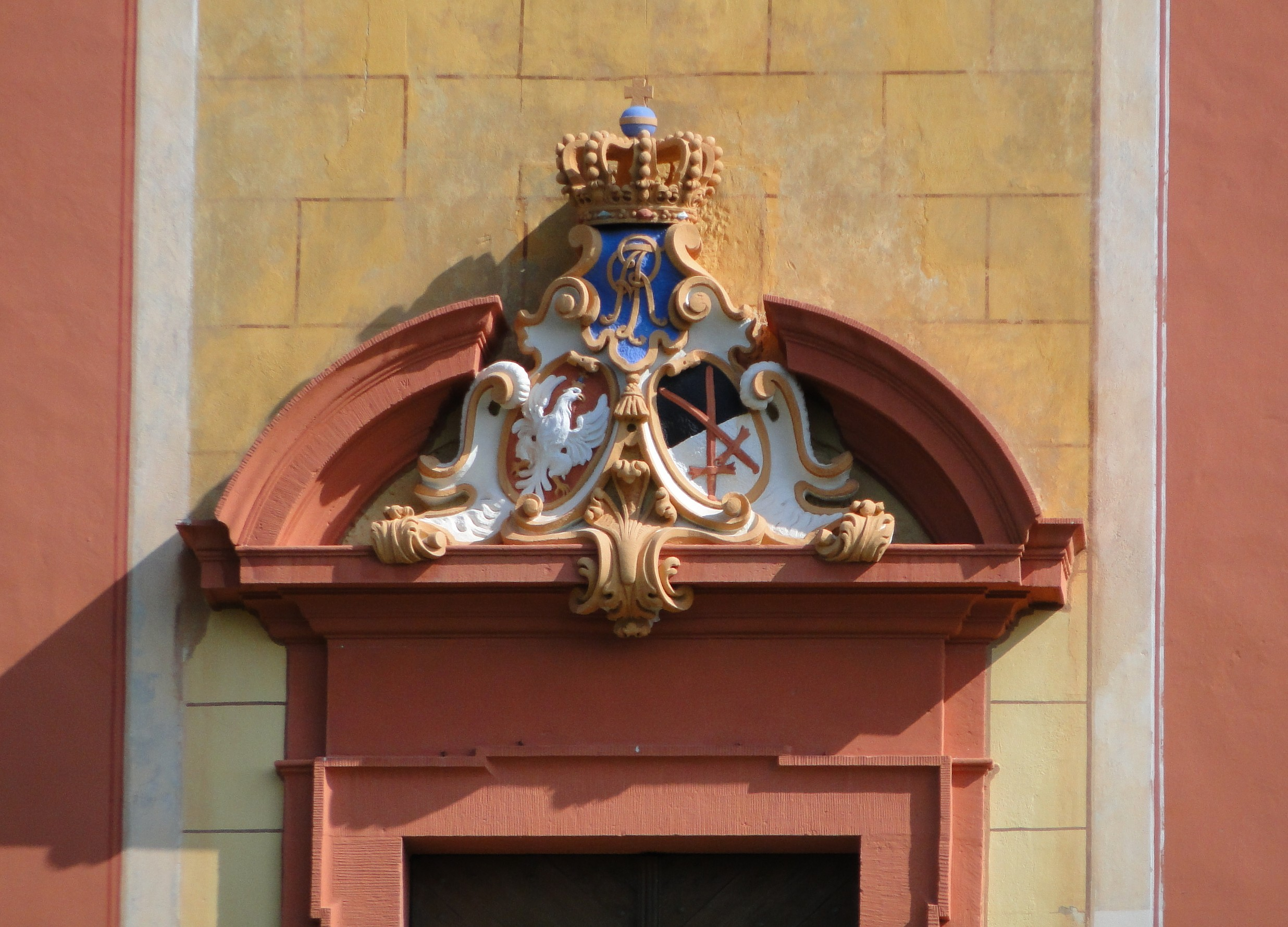
Portal sculpture by Johann Benjamin Thomae

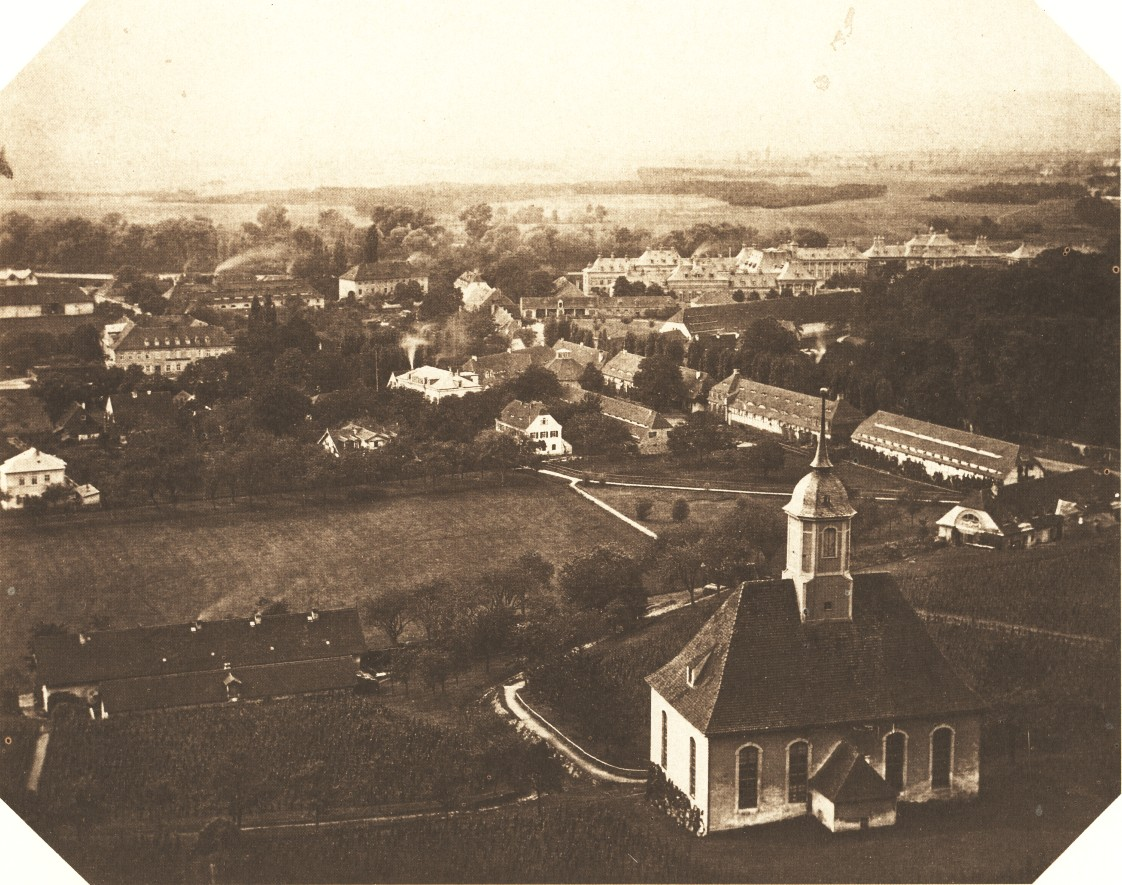
The Vineyard Church before 1873 in a photograph by August Kotzsch with a short sacristy, without facade painting and uncovered ridge turret

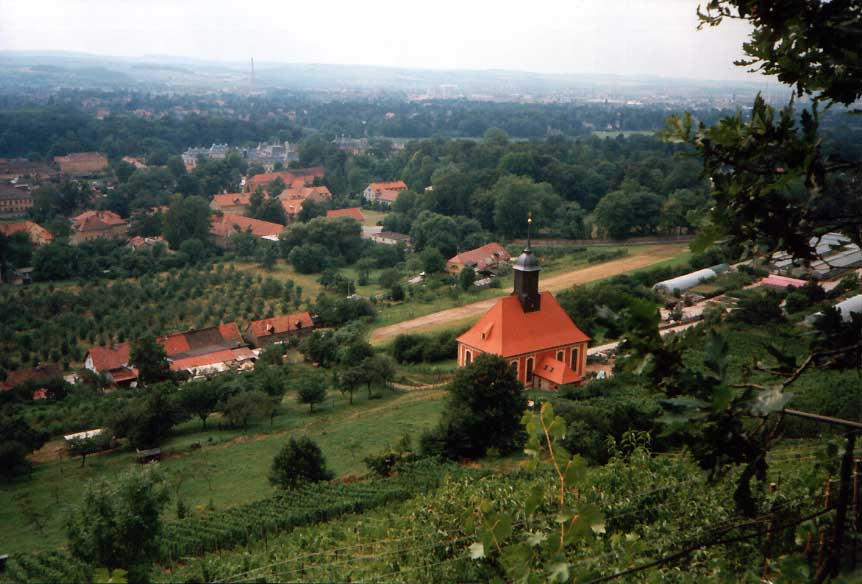
The Vineyard Church in 1994 with extended sacristy, restored illusion painting and copper ridge turret

The Vineyard Church was built on a rectangular ground plan. A sacristy was added to the north in the rising ground, which was extended during the restoration of the church in the 1990s. The main entrance is on the south side, which is designed as a "showcase of five axes". A two-flight staircase leads to the portal of the vineyard church. Its only facade decoration is a sandstone sculpture made between 1726 and 1727 by Johann Benjamin Thomae. It contains a double cartouche with the coat of arms of the Electorate of Saxony and Poland above a frieze in a blasted pediment. Above it are the monogram AR for Augustus Rex, King August II of Poland, and the royal crown. Cornelius Gurlitt mentioned an inscription above the portal, remnants of which were visible despite being painted over around 1900. It was conserved and covered with paint during the restoration in the 1990s. A second entrance is possible via the west side of the church; a single flight of stairs leads to the unadorned entrance there. During the construction of the vineyard church, burial vaults were created in its center. The burial of the dead from the old castle church took place through an entrance under the main southern entrance. At first, only the foundation walls of the church closed this entrance, later the staircase was built in front of it. The Vineyard Church has a hip roof with three dormers and a central, wooden ridge turret. It has a square ground plan up to ridge height and then builds up "in rough baroque forms [eight-sided]." It is topped by a helmet-like roof hood; at the top there is a weather vane on a steeple ball with the inscription "ARPo 1723" for Augustus Rex Poloniae and a crown. The year 1723 refers to the date of laying the foundation stone. The height of the church without the weathervane is 31.10 meters. The facades were originally "executed as a plaster construction as a substitute for a precious articulation of sandstone ... and painted with an illusion architecture, walls with shadow edges, roofing and pilasters." Thus, the church externally resembled Pillnitz Palace. However, the earliest drawings show the plaster facades of the church already in a whitewashed state, which remained unchanged until the 1990s. The original color scheme of the facade could be reconstructed and restored in the course of the restoration in the 1990s by examining the plaster.

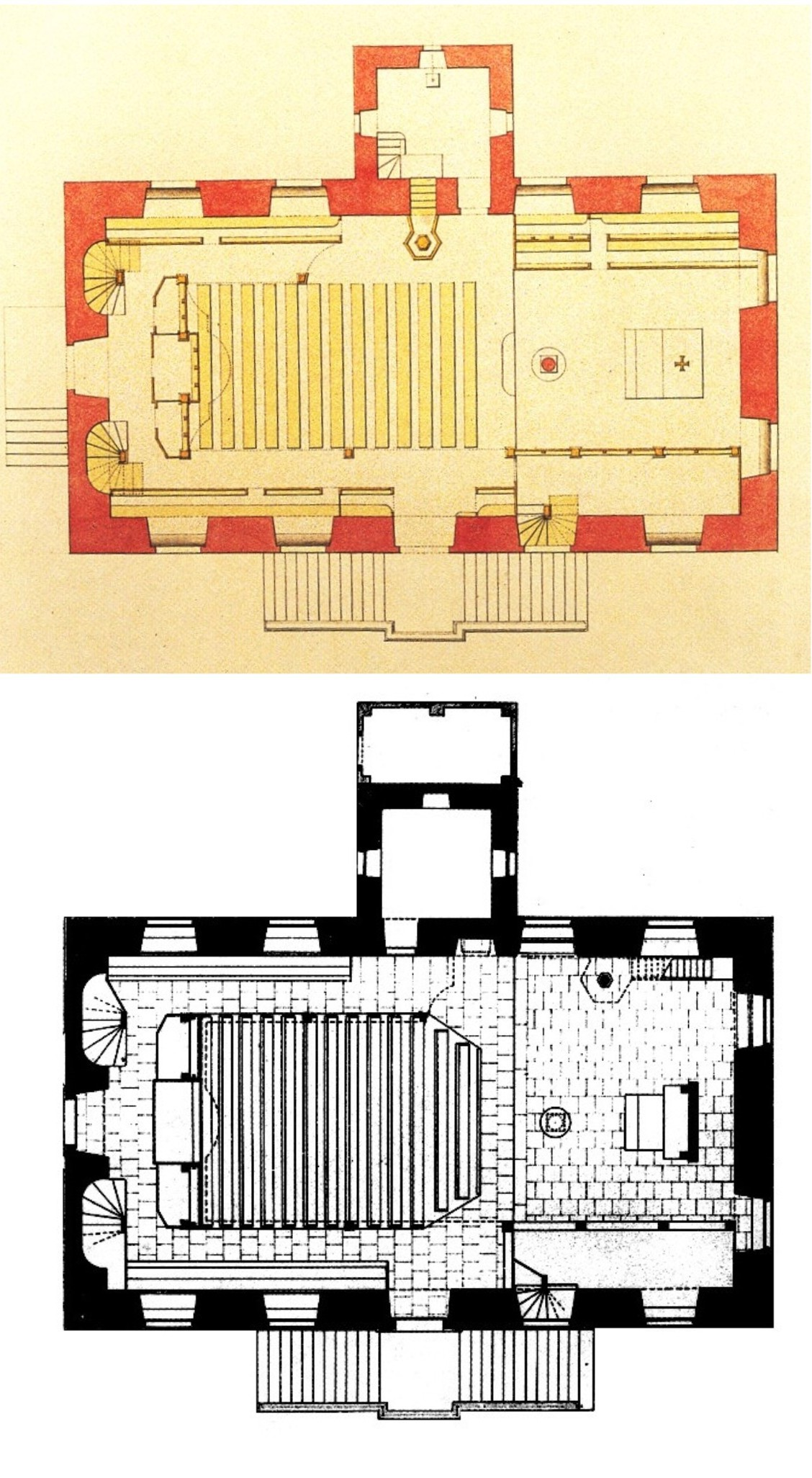
Floor plans 1820 (top) and 1950 (bottom). The extension of the sacristy, the relocation of its entrance and the new location of the pulpit are recognizable.

=== Inner ===
The church interior measures about 20 by 10 meters and is eight meters high. Including the crypt vault, the height of the church is 9.90, the width including outer walls is 21.8, and the depth with outer walls is 12.6 meters. The floor is covered with sandstone slabs, the altar is raised by one step. The twelve tall windows are closed in the segmental arch and framed by sandstone walls. They were modeled after the destroyed original windows and donated to the church during the restoration in the 1990s. Two windows made of tinted glass, inserted at the turn of the century on the east side, were not preserved in the 1990s and were not reconstructed. The flat ceiling is decorated with simple stucco moldings.

Behind the main portal, on the south side towards the east, there are ground-level boxes with an access to the galleries. They belong to the raised altar area that occupies the east side of the church. There is the altar, in front of it the baptismal font and on the north side the pulpit. Opposite the main entrance is the entrance to the sacristy. The rear part of the nave is occupied by three prayer rooms, above which is the organ choir. Next to the west portal, on the right and left side, there are entrances to the galleries and the bell tower.

During the restoration of the church it was discovered through color investigations that there were already red curtains painted behind the altar and the pulpit around 1725. They were possibly intended to highlight the white altar and pulpit in the church interior, which was also white. The restorers restored the painted curtain behind the altar. Since the pulpit was moved in 1853, the other curtain could not be restored to its original place. Today it would be partially covered by the extended galleries.

==== Seating ====
The church can accommodate 450 to 500 people. In the 18th century, "the confessional, the church fathers' chair and 2 rows of men's seats" were placed in the chancel; other men's seats were located in the galleries. The pews for women were located in the nave and were also placed outside the chancel against the church wall. Until 1728, three prayer rooms for rich Pillnitz citizens were added under the choir on the west side. They were located behind the "women's chairs" under the organ loft and had to be built by the owners at their own expense. In addition, a fee had to be paid to the church. The seating in the sanctuary was removed in 1853 when the pulpit was moved there. The side pews in the nave were removed in 1954.

==== Emporiums ====
The galleries of the church were originally shorter than today. They initially occupied the south and west sides; a court and ruler's lodge was installed under the south gallery in the altar area and a box for court officials above it. The galleries were lengthened by a quarter during the renovation of 1852 to 1853, and since 1892 they have occupied half the north side up to the chancel.

When a new, larger organ was installed in 1891, the second west gallery was recessed to the organ depth, the organ choir on the first west gallery was enlarged, and new side entrances to the west galleries were created. The galleries have two stories and stand on square columns; "the parapets are divided into long rectangular bays."

==== Altar ====
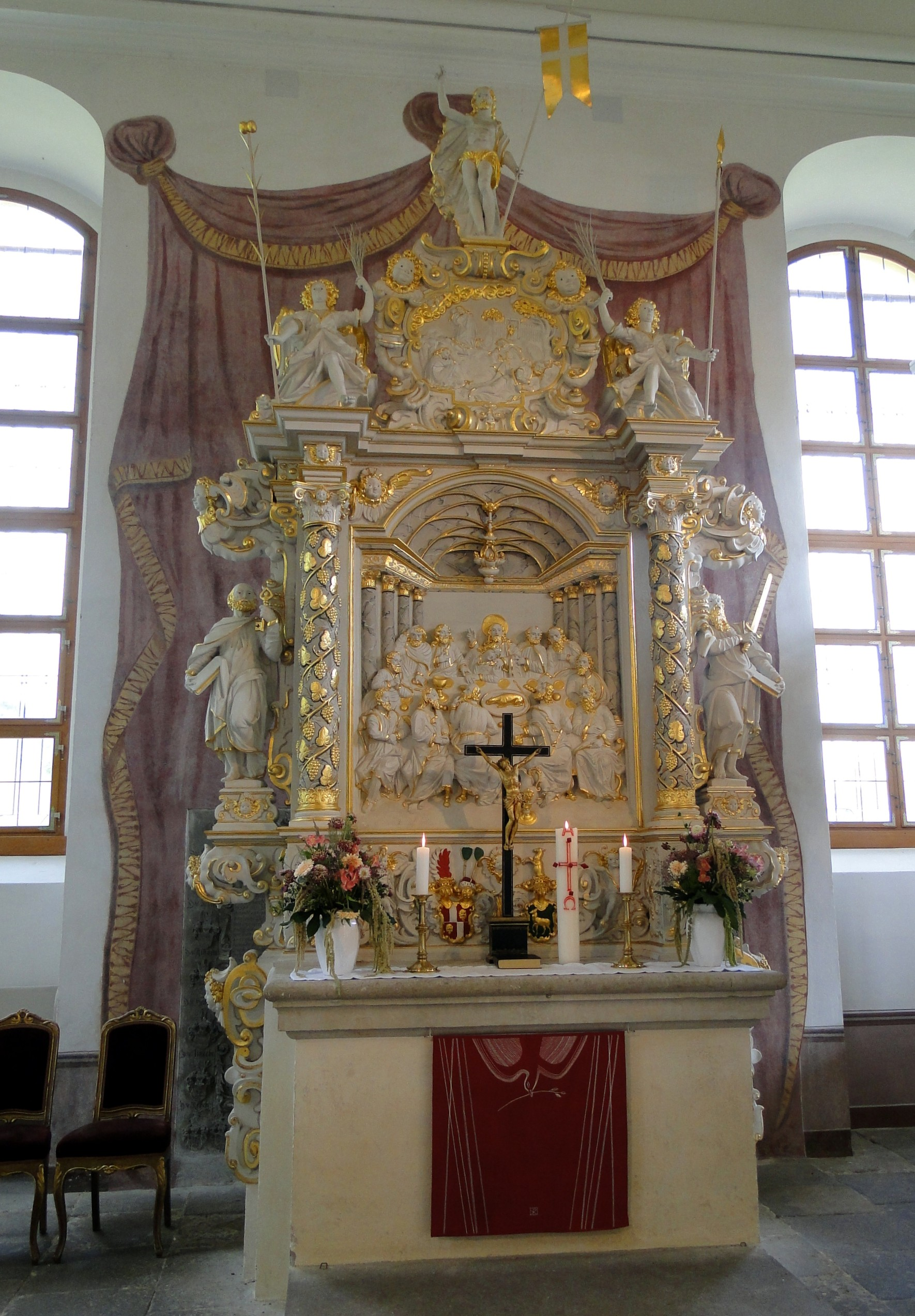
Vineyard Church altar

The altar was created in 1648 by the Colditz-born sculptor Johann Georg Kretzschmar (1612-1653, son-in-law of the Dresden sculptor Sebastian Walther) after the end of the Thirty Years' War. The back wall bears the inscription "Johann George Kretzschmer, bilthauer in Dresden, den 19. 8ber anno 1648."

The sandstone altar is 2.70 meters wide and 5.85 meters high. Above the simple refectory is the predella with the coats of arms of the founder families von Bünau on the left and von Löser on the right. Both coats of arms, separated by a putto head, are colored. The predella is "filled by run-ons and scrollwork" and is bordered by two pedestals, on each of which stands a Corinthian column entwined with vines.

Between the columns in the center field of the altar, a 1.32 by 1.73 meter relief depicts the Last Supper with Christ and the twelve disciples; on the table are the paschal lamb and the wine cup. A row of four columns on each side gives depth to the relief; a candelabrum is mounted above the scene on a cross-ribbed vault.

Two meter-sized apostle figures stand on corbel-like volutes next to the columns. The left pedestal carries Peter with book and key, the right Paul with book and sword.

Architrave and frieze above the apostle figures are interrupted by the ceiling representation of the relief, while the cornice is continuous. Above the cornice, with legs crossed, sit two angelic figures with instruments of the Passion. The one on the left holds a vinegar sponge on a tube and a rod, while the one on the right holds a rod and a lance. In the ornamental pediment between the two figures is a relief of Christ praying in the Garden of Gethsemane. In the foreground are depicted the sleeping disciples. The altar is finished with a figure of the resurrected Christ, the right hand raised in blessing and in the left the flag of faith.

While Cornelius Gurlitt attested to the sculptor Kretzschmar on the altar "everywhere a powerful skill, sure of form", Walter Hentschel saw the significance of Kretzschmar's work in 1966 only in its relatively good general condition:

But that is all that can be said in praise of the work. The figurative is crude and seems downright wild in the large communion relief. Volutes, consoles, cartouches approach in some parts the cartilage work, are shaped doughy soft, but Kretzschmar is not able to swing out to the full freedom of this style [...] His art was provincial ... -Walter Hentschel

During the restoration of the church in the early 1990s, the figural decoration on the altar was supplemented, as the flag of faith, the rods and the sword of the Pauline figure had already been missing around 1900. The largely faded or completely disappeared colors of the altar were restored from 1993 to 1994. Except for the colored coats of arms in the predella, the sandstone altar is in white with gilded details.

==== Baptismal font ====
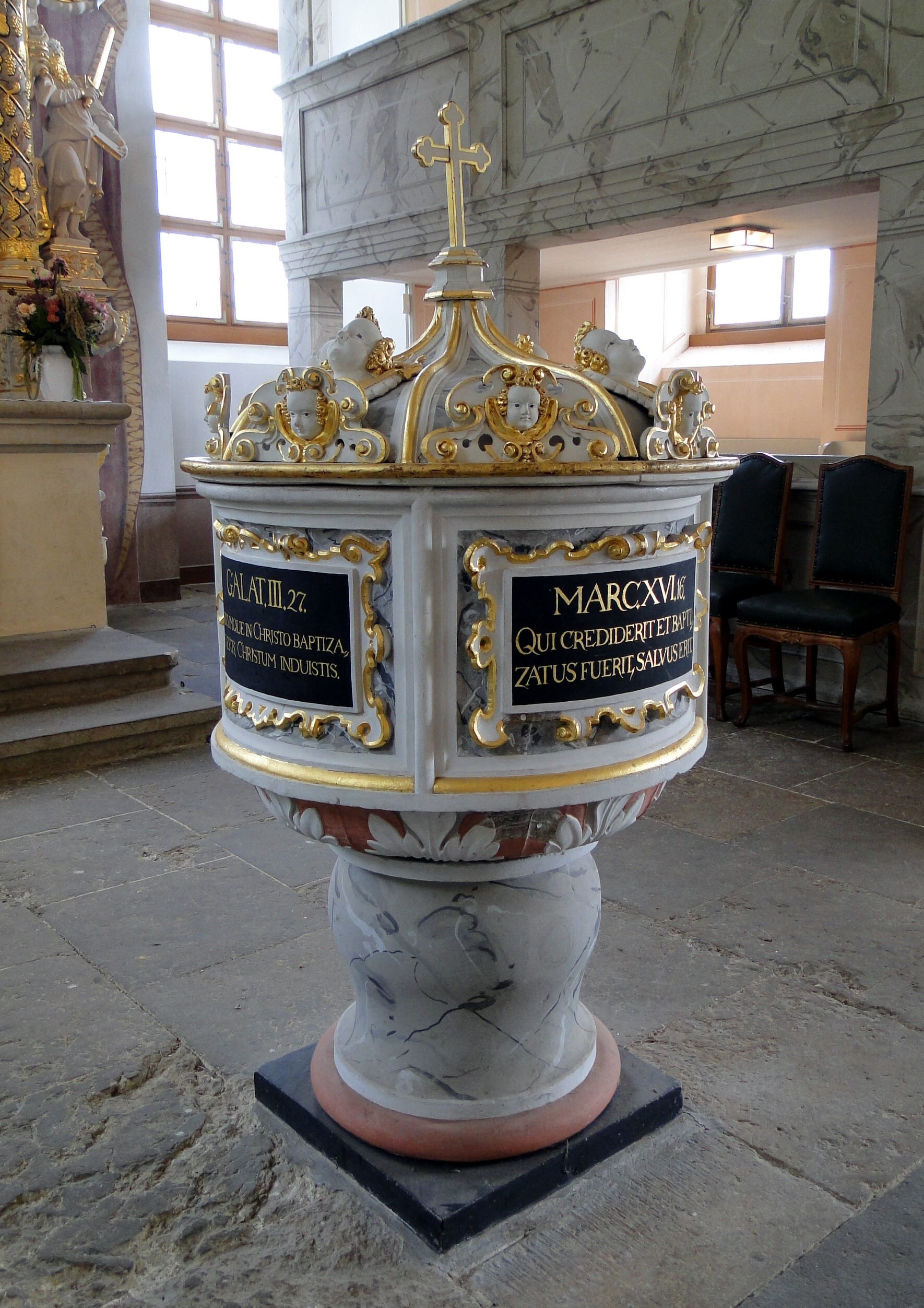
Baptismal font

In front of the altar is the baptismal font, about one meter high, probably made at the same time as the altar and attributed to Johann Georg Kretzschmar. The structure is made of sandstone, the lid is made of wood. Above a profiled base and a round pedestal is the cylindrical dome, in which four black panels with biblical quotations in gold letters are embedded. The panels are enclosed by scrollwork. The eight-sided lid with angel heads bears a cross on top. In a description of the baptismal font by Ferdinand Ludwig Zacharias from 1826, the figure of John the Baptist is mentioned as the finial rather than a cross. Like the altar, the baptismal font is white with gold ornamentation. At the base, as well as on the baluster of the church, a marbling was painted on.

==== Pulpit ====
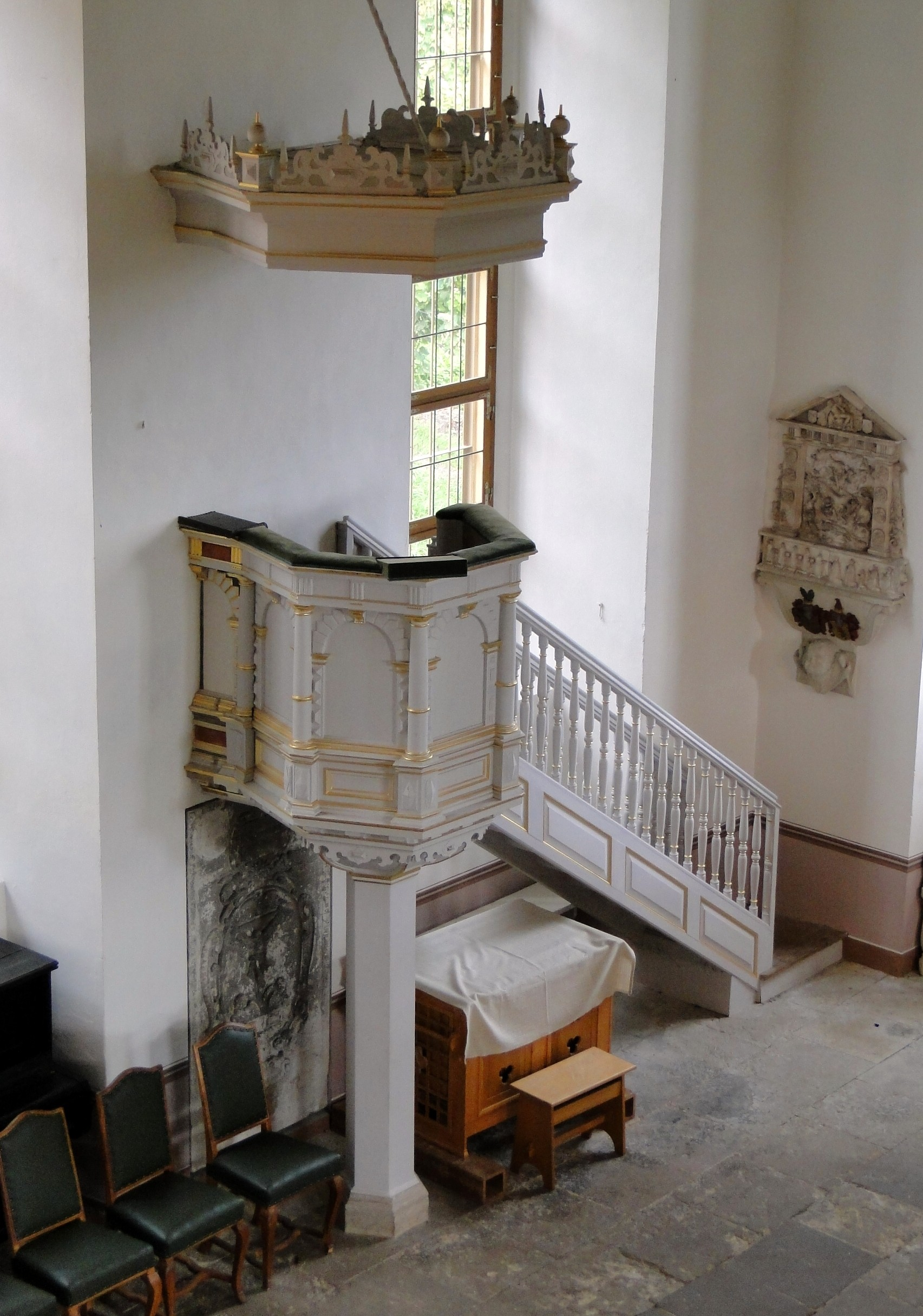
Pulpit

The sandstone pulpit, located in the altar area on the north side, is supported by a hexagonal column that merges into a bulging transition with a corbelled cornice to the pulpit basket. The pulpit basket is hexagonal in shape and is closed on four sides. One side is open and leads to the staircase, the sixth side forms the church wall.

The fields of the pulpit basket are bordered by Doric columns, which stand between the pedestal and the architrave. Round arches in the fields between the columns are laterally ashlar. In the continuous frieze there are triglyphs.

The sounding board of the pulpit made of wood is six-sided like the pulpit basket. Together with the parapet of the pulpit basket, it belonged to an older 17th-century installation and corresponds in its coarseness to the style of the altar and the baptismal font. It is probable that these pulpit parts came from the old castle church.

Originally, the pulpit was connected to the sacristy by a staircase and was located in the center of the north wall opposite the main portal. During the renovation from 1852 to 1853, the pulpit was moved to the east. The new staircase to the sacristy was built at this time.

==== Epitaphs and monuments ====
In the vineyard church, numerous epitaphs and monuments commemorate members of the von Loss and von Bünau families. They were transferred from the old castle church to the vineyard church and placed in the church interior on the east and north sides.

==== East side ====
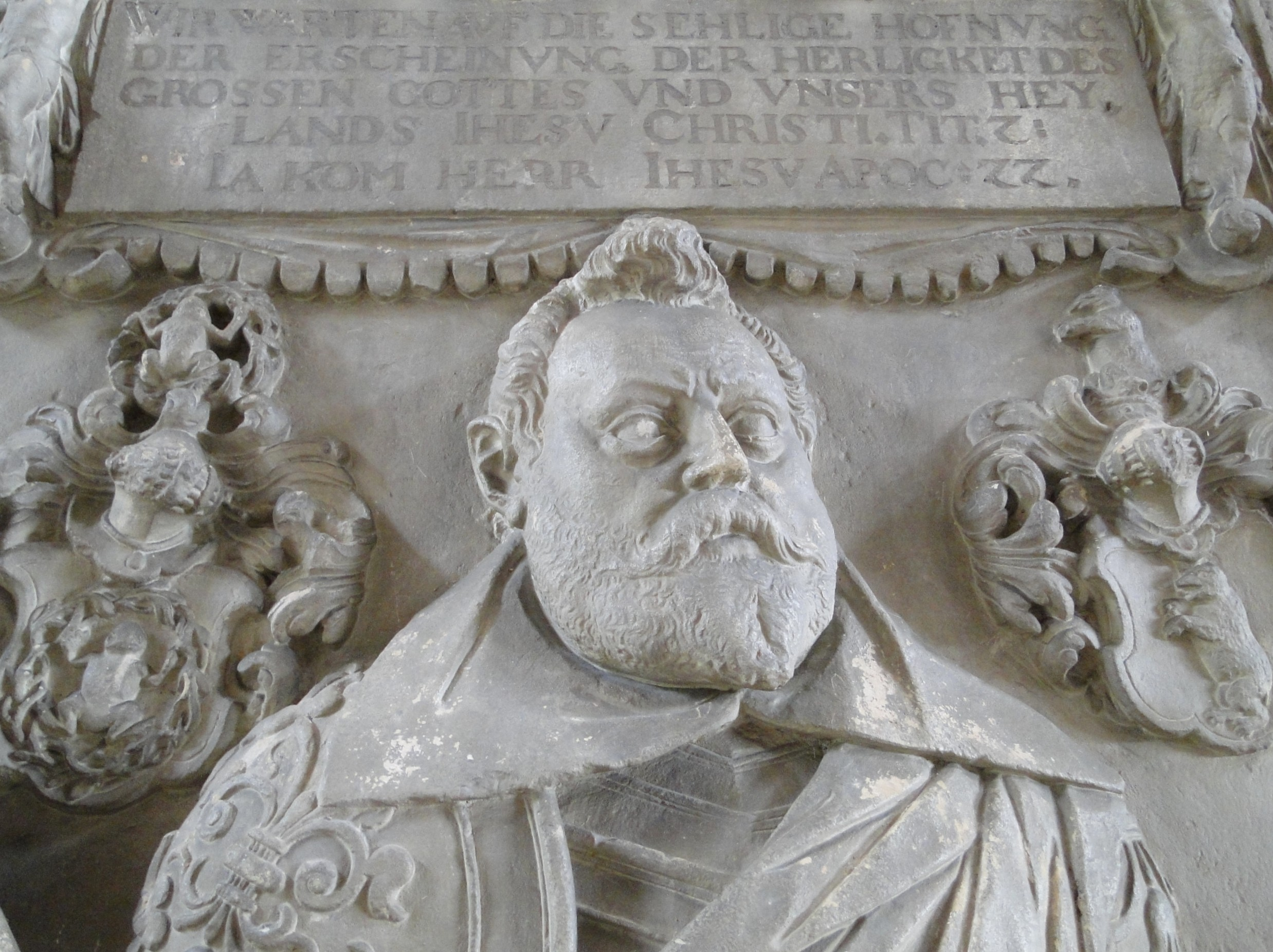
Epitaph of Christoph von Loss, in detail

Behind the altar there are three epitaphs side by side. The 2.20 meter high right tombstone of Ursula von Loss, née von Schleinitz, shows Christ on the cross, an inscription plate and representations of coats of arms. Ursula von Loß was the wife of Joachim von Loß and died in 1632. The middle epitaph, 2.30 meters high, consists of a life-size figure of Christoph von Loß the Elder († 1609) in full armor with a field staff in his right hand. Gurlitt described the monument as a "noteworthy, competent work." The left tombstone, 1.85 meters high with numerous representations of coats of arms and angel figures, is that of Martha von Loß, née von Köckeritz. She married Christoph von Loß's third-born son Nicol and died in 1645. Her tombstone "is neatly executed in late Renaissance forms."

Above the epitaph of Christoph von Loss the Elder there was originally a wooden funerary shield, which was made on the occasion of the death of Günther von Bünau in 1659 and later transferred from the old castle church. It shows the family coat of arms of the von Bünau family in the center and 16 other coats of arms of families connected with them arranged around it. After the restoration in 1996, the funerary shield was moved to the center of the north wall.

==== North side ====
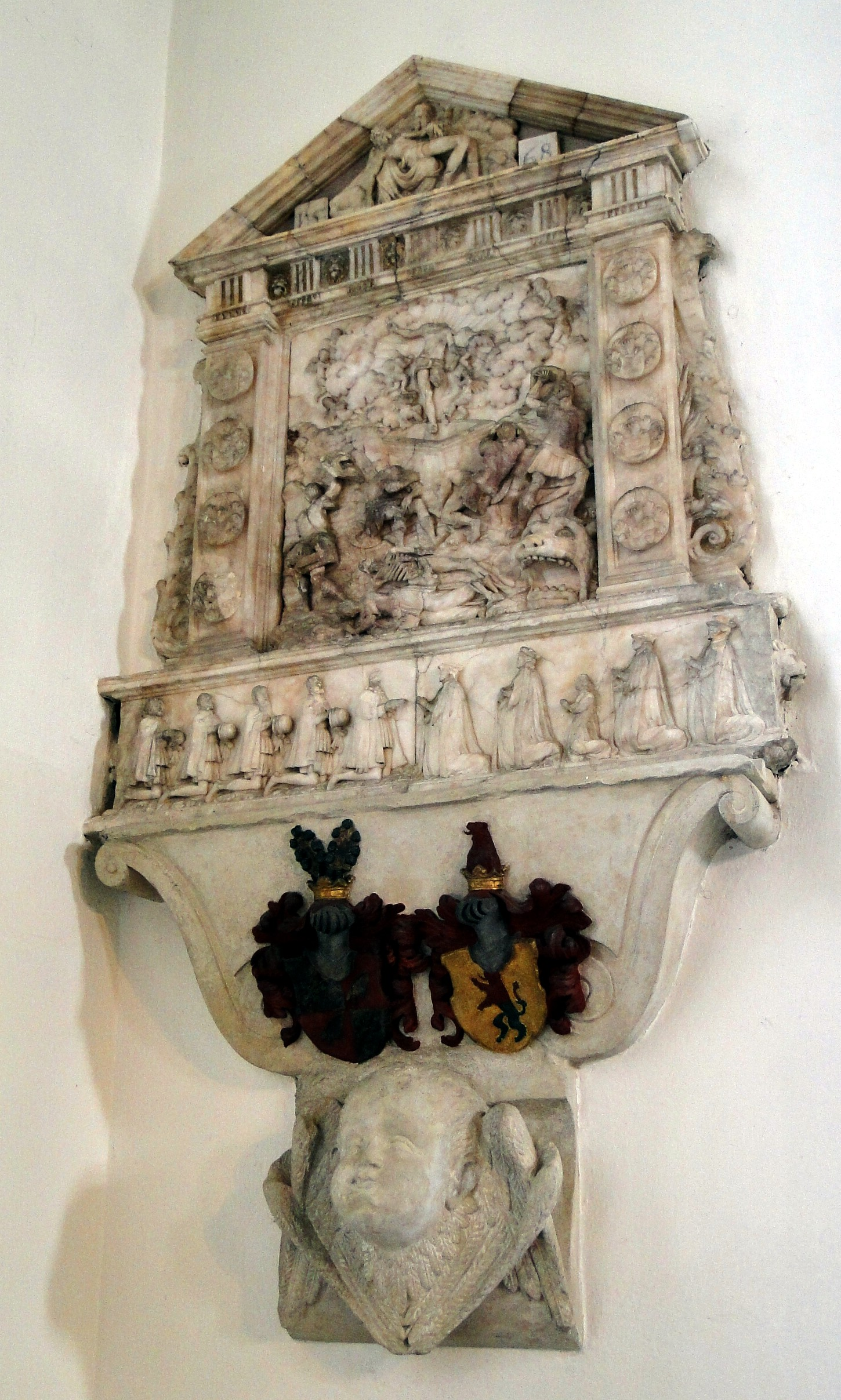
Epitaph of Valentin Pflugk

On the north wall at the pulpit entrance is the epitaph for Valentin Pflugk auf Knauthain († 1568), the father-in-law of Christoph von Loss the Elder. The base with the coats of arms of the von Pflugk (left) and von Schönberg (right) - Pflugk's wife came from the house of Roth-Schönberg - above an angel's head is made of sandstone, the superstructure is made of alabaster. On the broad pedestal kneel five men on the left and five women on the right in profile. Two lateral pilasters each bear four coats of arms, including those of the Pflugk, Bünau and Schönberg families. Between the pilasters is a partially damaged relief depicting the Resurrection of Jesus. The central part of the superstructure ends with an entablature in which Doric columns alternate with lion heads. The epitaph ends with a pointed pediment. In it there is a relief of the Trinity. It depicts the seated God the Father holding Jesus in front of him, with the dove perched on his left shoulder. Gurlitt assigned the epitaph to the school of Hans Walther.

Under the pulpit is the 1.80 meter high gravestone of Günther von Bünau's first wife, Sophie Sibylle von Bünau, née von Loß, who died in 1640. On the tombstone, the crucified Christ is depicted on an oval field with echoes of Renaissance and Baroque.

Next to the sacristy door is the gravestone of Günther von Bünau, who died in 1659. The simple gravestone originally bore an inscription in the center. On the edges there are reliefs of coats of arms.

To the west of it there is a simple tombstone of Johann Albrecht Slavata von Chlum und Koschumberg, a cousin of Wilhelm Slavata, who died in 1654 and lived in exile in Pillnitz. In addition to family coats of arms, the gravestone contains an inscription. Especially the lower parts of the gravestone are badly damaged.

On the westernmost corner of the north wall is the 1.20 meter high epitaph of Anna Sophie von Bünau, who died in 1637 at the age of seven weeks. The relief shows the child in a shroud with folded hands, guided by childlike angel figures. Anna Sophie von Bünau was the daughter of Günther and Sophie Sibylle von Bünau.

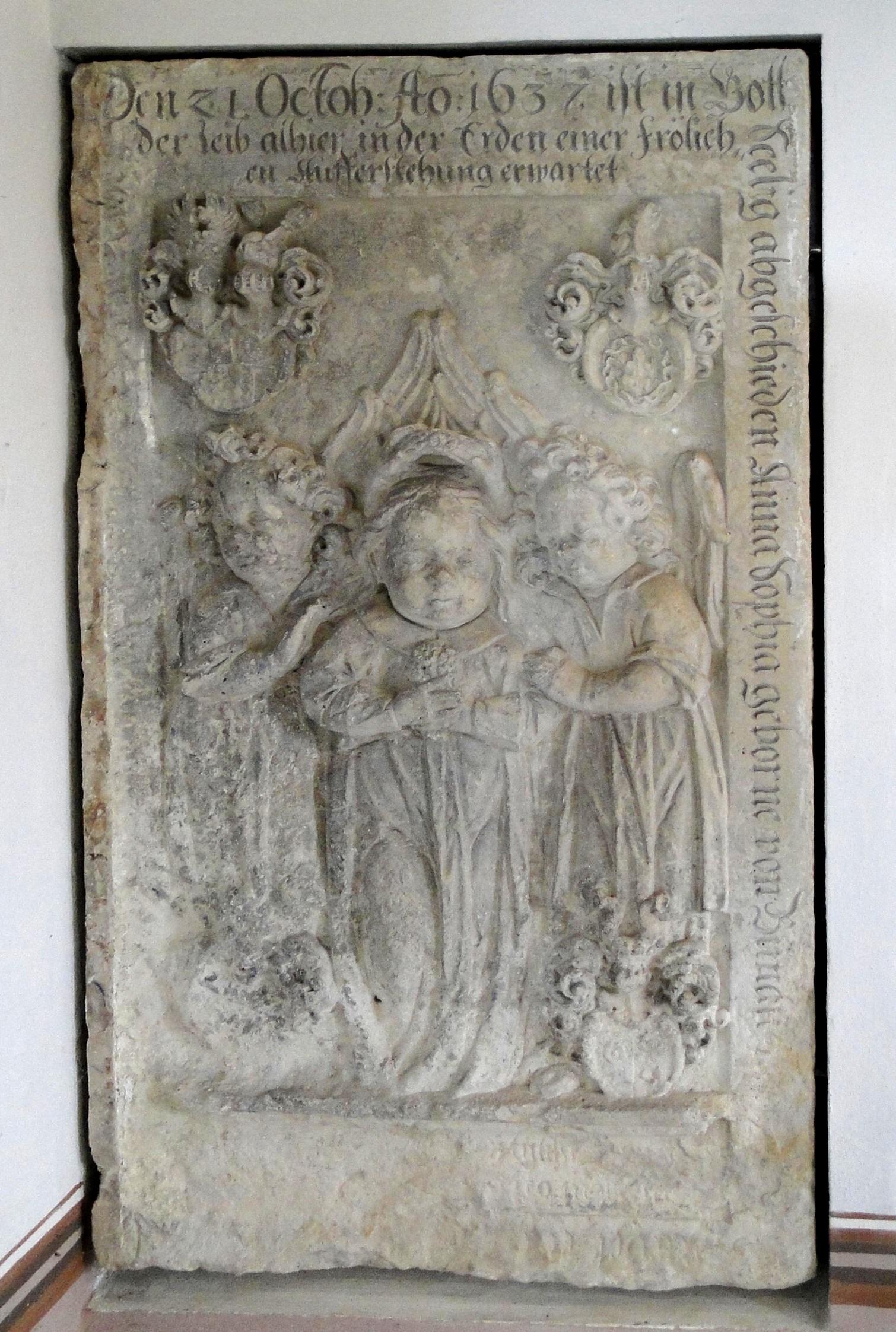
Epitaph of Anna Sophie von Bünau

==== Lost church ornaments ====
In 1904, Cornelius Gurlitt mentioned two paintings that were in the church at the time. One was a bust portrait of Martin Luther in oil by Lucas Cranach from 1546. Gurlitt described the painting, which hung on the parapet of the organ gallery, as "carefully executed workshop work."

A second, damaged oil painting with a portrait of Philipp Melanchthon was probably "blos Copie nach Cranach", was kept in the sacristy and later attached to the pulpit. Around 1931, the absence of both paintings was noticed for the first time. A survey of former pastors of the Vineyard Church revealed that "the Melanchthon painting ... had been [missing] since the turn of the century, the Luther painting since about 1920." Both paintings have disappeared.

== Organ ==
The first organ of the vineyard church came from the old castle church. Its age and builder are not known. The instrument had 6 manual stops (C-d3: Gedackt 8′, Flöte 4′, Gedackt 4′, Principal 2′, Quinte 1 1/2′, Zimbel II) and one pedal stop (C-c1: Principal Bass 8′); the manual could be coupled to the pedal. This organ was too small for the church space and was described as "unworthy" of the church in a report by the Jehmlich Orgelbau Dresden.

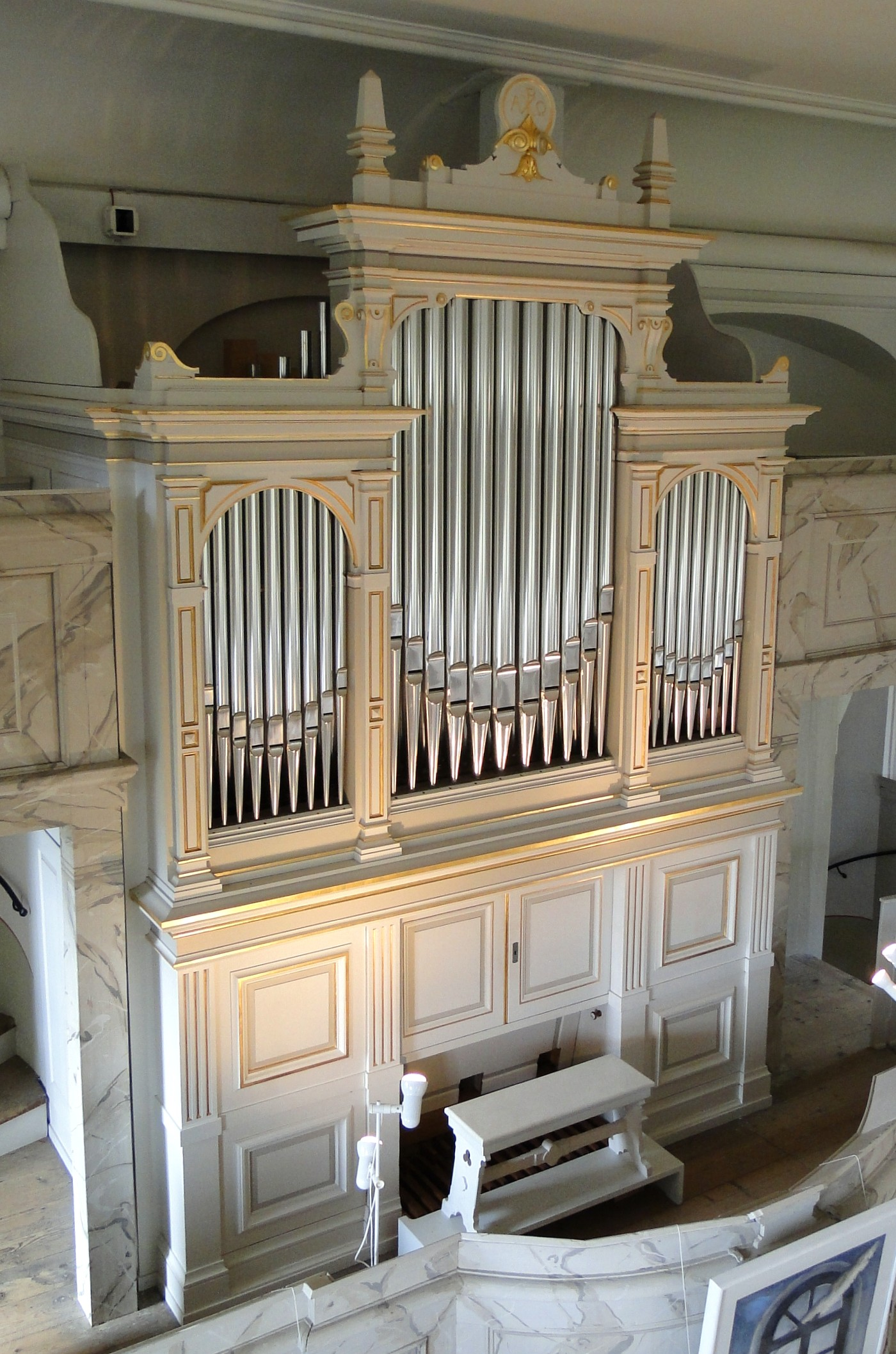
Jehmlich organ of the Vineyard Church

In 1889, the Jehmlich brothers received the order for a new organ. The instrument cost 4200 marks and was consecrated on July 19, 1891. It is one of the earliest pneumatic organs in Saxony (the first such instrument was consecrated in 1888 in the church in Röhrsdorf). In 1907 the organ was repaired, cleaned and tuned. At the end of the First World War in 1918, the front pipes made of tin had to be handed in for melting, they were replaced by pipes made of zinc.

After the end of the use of the church in 1976, the organ remained in its place and decayed like the church building. All organ pipes were stolen, so that during the restoration and reconstruction work by the organ pipe Ekkehart Groß and Johannes Soldan in 1997, all pipes had to be reconstructed. On June 29, 1997, the congregation celebrated the rededication of the Jehmlich pipe-pneumatic organ.

I Manual C–f3
Principal	8'
Viola da Gamba	8'
Flute	8'
Octave	4'
Quinte	2 2/3'
Octave	2′
Terz	1 3/5'

I Manual C–f3
Aeoline	8'
Lieblich Gedackt	8'
Chimney flute	4'

Pedal C–d1
Sub-bass	16'	(h)
Principal Bass	8'	(h)

- Couplers:II/I,I/P
- Spielhilfen: Chorale work, Full work, Crescendo pedal.
- Notes

(h) = original preserved register

== Bells ==
In the beginning, the Vineyard Church had the three bells from the old castle church. The large bell broke in 1780 and was replaced around 1800 by a new casting by Heinrich August Weinholdt. A second bell had to be replaced in 1873 by a new casting from the Royal Piece Foundry J. G. Große, but was lost as a metal donation during the First World War. It was replaced in 2002 by a new casting from the Karlsruhe bell foundry Bachert.

No.	Picture	Name	Casting year	Height Diameter	Key note	Inscription Jewelry
1		Large bell	1800	70 cm 86 cm	b^{1}	Anno 1800 cast me. Heinrich August Weinholdt in Dresden Ornamental band of grapes, depiction of the Elector Friedrich August I.
2		Middle bell	2002		des^{2}	Aufbruch und Rettung, 2002 wurde ich in Karlsruhe gegossen, Gott hat uns nicht gegeben den Geist der Furcht sondern den Geist der Besonnenheit Aufhänger in Faustform, Hals mit Weinrankenband
3		Small bell	1596	43 cm 57 cm	f^{2}	anno M.D.XCVI sic transit gloria mundi Renaissance tendril work with half figures

== Bibliography ==
- Dehio-Handbuch der deutschen Kunstdenkmäler. Dresden. Aktualisierte Auflage. Deutscher Kunstverlag, München/ Berlin 2005, pp. 190–191.
- Dieter Fischer: Zur Geschichte und Restaurierung der Pillnitzer Weinbergkirche „Zum Heiligen Geist“. In: Dresdner Geschichtsverein e.V. (Hrsg.): Dresdner Hefte. Jahrgang 11, Heft 34, Ausgabe 2, 1993, pp. 84–88.
- Dieter Fischer, Staatliche Schlösser und Gärten (Hrsg.): Die Weinbergkirche „Zum Heiligen Geist“ in Dresden-Pillnitz. Eine Darstellung ihrer Geschichte bis zur jetzigen Wiederherstellung. Eigenverlag, Dresden 1994.
- Dieter Fischer, Interessengemeinschaft Weinbergkirche Pillnitz e.V. (Hrsg.): Die Weinbergkirche „Zum Heiligen Geist“ in Dresden-Pillnitz. Geschichte und vollendete Restaurierung 270 Jahre nach der Kirchweihe. Michel Sandstein, Dresden 1996, ISBN 3-930382-15-6
- Cornelius Gurlitt: Beschreibende Darstellung der älteren Bau- und Kunstdenkmäler des Königreichs Sachsen. Band 26. Meinhold, Dresden 1904. (Textlich unveränderter Nachdruck. Verlag für Kunstreproduktionen, Neustadt an der Aisch 2002, ISBN 3-89557-185-7, pp. 159–168)
- Hans-Günther Hartmann: Pillnitz. Schloss, Park und Dorf. Hermann Böhlaus Nachfolger, Weimar 1981, pp. 101–104.
- Hermann Heckmann: Matthäus Daniel Pöppelmann und die Barockbaukunst in Dresden. Verlag für Bauwesen, Berlin 1986, ISBN 3-345-00018-0, pp. 121–123.
- Walter Hentschel: Dresdner Bildhauer des 16. und 17. Jahrhunderts. Hermann Böhlaus Nachfolger, Weimar 1966, pp. 97, 157–158.
- Hartmut Mai: Matthäus Daniel Pöppelmanns Anteil am evangelischen Kirchenbau des Barocks in Dresden. In: Harald Marx (Hrsg.): Matthäus Daniel Pöppelmann. Der Architekt des Dresdner Zwingers. VEB E. A. Seemann Buch- und Kunstverlag, Leipzig 1990, S. 262–270, speziell pp. 265–266.
- Folke Stimmel, Reinhardt Eigenwill u. a.: Stadtlexikon Dresden. Verlag der Kunst, Dresden 1994, p. 452.
