= Matthäus Daniel Pöppelmann =

German master builder and architect

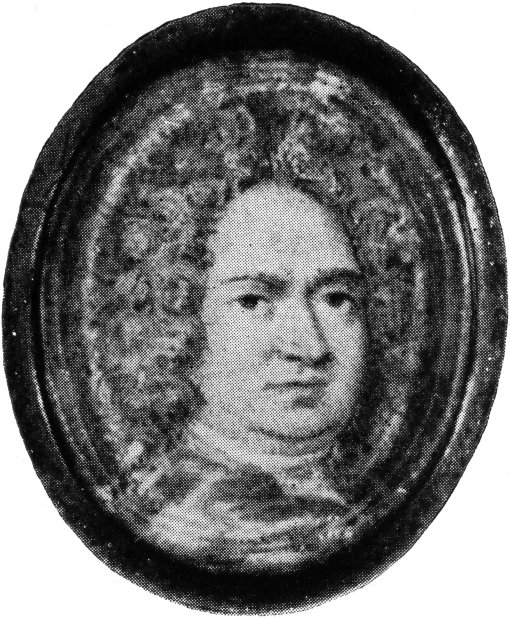
Matthäus Daniel Pöppelmann

Matthäus Daniel Pöppelmann (1662–1736) was a German master builder and architect who helped to rebuild Dresden after the fire of 1685. His most famous work is the Zwinger Palace.

== Life ==
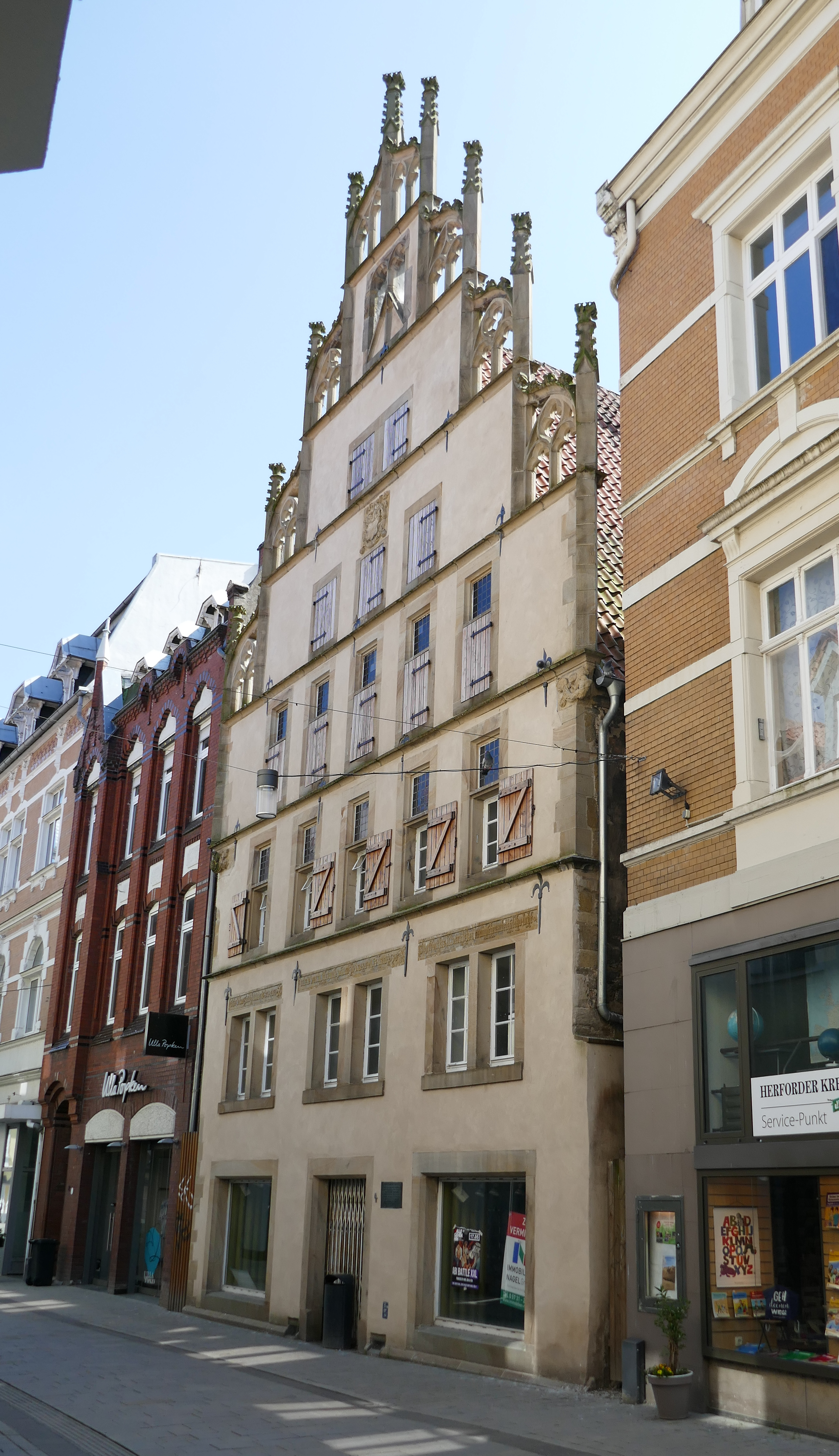
Pöppelmann's birth house in Herford, Westphalia

Pöppelmann was born in Herford in Westphalia on 3 May 1662 the son of a shopkeeper.

In 1680, he began working on an unpaid basis as a building designer in the court of Dresden Castle.

As court architect for the King of Poland and Elector of Saxony, Augustus II the Strong, he designed the grandiose Zwinger palace in Dresden. He was also in charge of major works at Dresden Castle, Pillnitz Castle and he designed the Vineyard Church (Weinbergkirche) in Pillnitz. Pöppelmann, together with Johann Christoph Naumann, developed an urban plan for a portion of the city of Warsaw, Poland, which was only partially realized, including the Saxon Axis and other important streetscapes.

He died in Dresden on 17 January 1736. He is buried in the Matthauskirche in Dresden.

He was the grandfather of the famous actress Friederike Sophie Seyler.
