= The Gazebo (disambiguation) =

The Gazebo is the title of a 1959 film.

The Gazebo may also refer to

- The Gazebo (play), the 1958 play from which the film was adapted
- The Gazebo (painting), an 1818 painting by Caspar David Friedrich
- The Gazebo (book), a 2008 autobiography of Alexander Lebenstein

== See also ==
- Gazebo (disambiguation)
