= Gazebo (disambiguation) =

A gazebo is a pavilion structure.

Gazebo may also refer to:

- Gazebo (musician) (Paul Mazzolini; born 1960), Italian singer
  - Gazebo (album), 1983
- Gazebo Books, an Australian publishing company
- Gazebo simulator, an open source robotics simulator
- Gazebo TV, a Sullivan Entertainment streaming service.
- The Gazebo, a 1959 black comedy film starring Glenn Ford and Debbie Reynolds
- The Gazebo (painting), an 1818 painting by Caspar David Friedrich
- The Gazebo (play), a play by Alec Coppel

== See also ==
- The Gazebo (disambiguation)
