= Cabin in the Snow =

1827 painting by Caspar David Friedrich

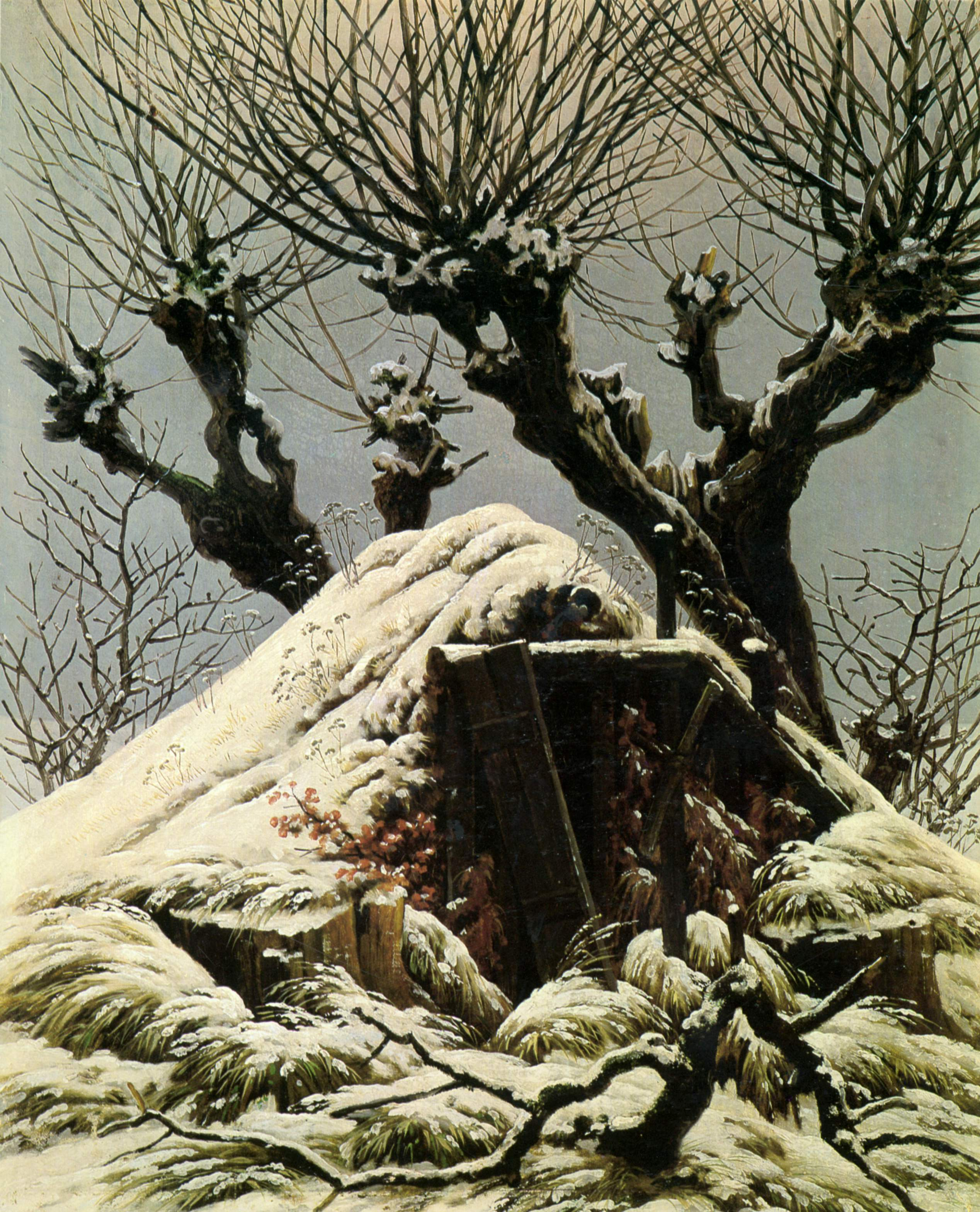
- Artist: Caspar David Friedrich
- Year: 1827
- Medium: oil on canvas
- Dimensions: 31 cm × 25 cm (12 in × 9.8 in)
- Location: Alte Nationalgalerie, Berlin

Cabin in the Snow or Cabin under Snow (German :Verschneite Hütte) is an 1827 oil painting on canvas by the German artist Caspar David Friedrich, first exhibited at the exhibition held by the Dresden Academy of Fine Arts, from which it was acquired by John I of Saxony.

The painting was acquired by Hugo Salm in 1924 and from at least 1933 it was in South America. It then came onto the Berlin art market and was bought by a private collector. In 1960 the Lottery Society of Berlin bought it for the Nationalgalerie, which has exhibited it in the Knobelsdorff wing of Schloss Charlottenburg (1986–2001) and in the Friedrich room of the Alte Nationalgalerie (since 2001).

Catherine Clinger has argued convincingly that, rather than representing a hut, or cottage, in the snow, the represented structure is the entrance to a mine shaft.

== See also ==
- List of works by Caspar David Friedrich
