= Boy Sleeping on a Grave =

Woodcut by Caspar David Friedrich

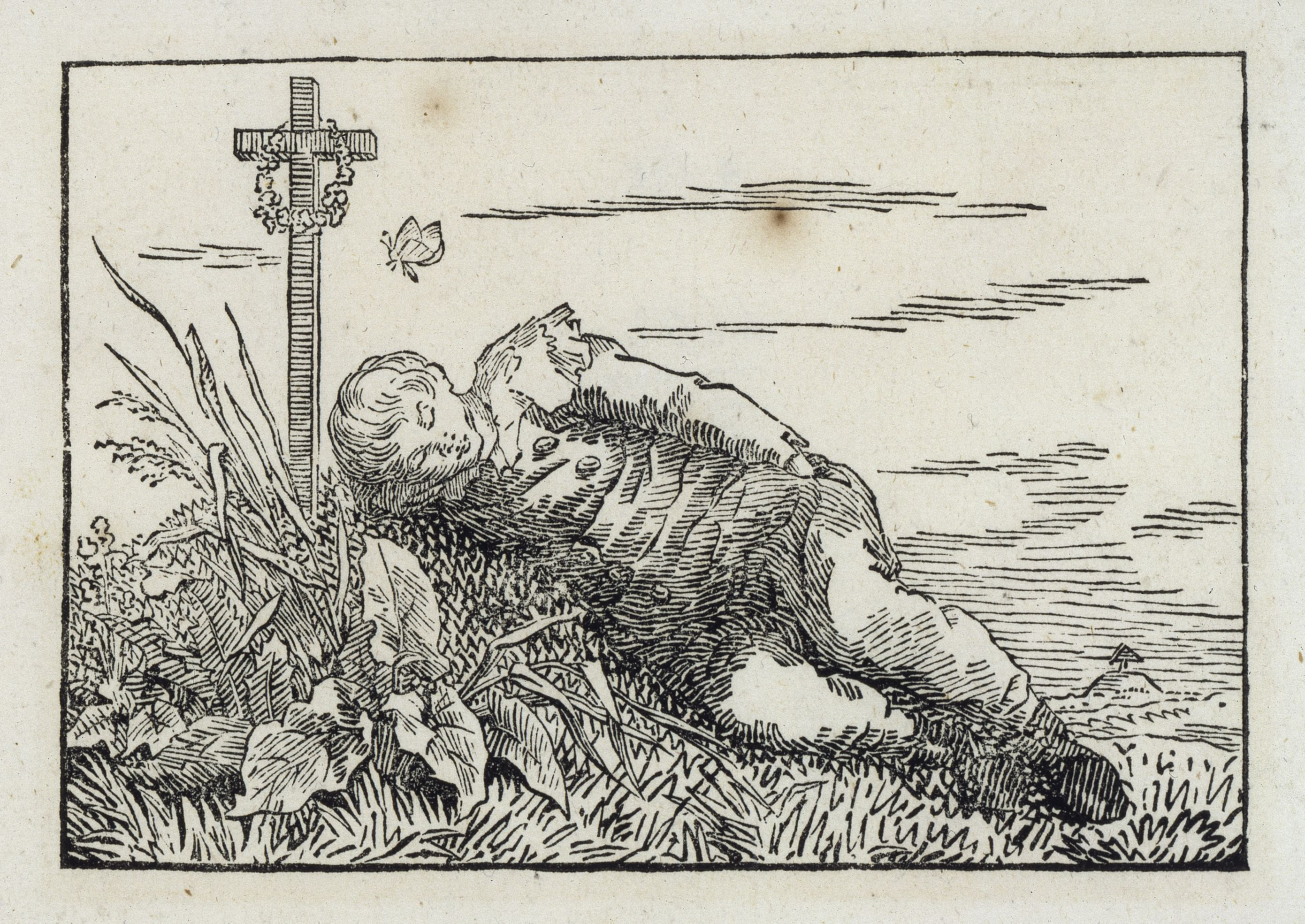
Boy Sleeping on a Grave (1803) by Caspar David Friedrich

Boy Sleeping on a Grave (German: Knabe auf einem Grab schlafend ) is a c. 1803 print designed by the German Romantic painter Caspar David Friedrich, and printed on paper as a woodcut, the block cut by his brother Christian Friedrich, who was a carpenter and furniture maker.

An example in the National Gallery of Canada measures just 7.7 cm × 11.4 cm (3.0 in × 4.5 in), and an example in the Metropolitan Museum of Art measures 7.8 cm × 12.4 cm (3.1 in × 4.9 in).

It is one of four woodcuts designed by Friedrich and cut by his brother around 1803. The wood blocks for three of the prints - Boy sleeping on a grave, Woman with the Spider's Web and Woman with a Raven at an Abyss - are held by the Hamburger Kunsthalle. It was suggested by the German art historian Helmut Börsch-Supan that they were made as illustrations for a book - perhaps a volume of Friedrich's poetry. The three prints were exhibited in Dresden in March 1804. These three illustrations are based on drawings by Friedrich in a sketchbook that he used from September 1800 to March 1802, now known as the Mannheim Sketchbook. Although the pages are now separated, eleven are held by the Kunsthalle Mannheim, but a pen and ink drawing of a sleeping boy (German: Schlafender Knabe) dated to 1802 is held by the Kunsthalle Bremen.

The fourth woodcut is a profile self-portrait of Friedrich, perhaps intended as a frontispiece for the same volume of poetry.

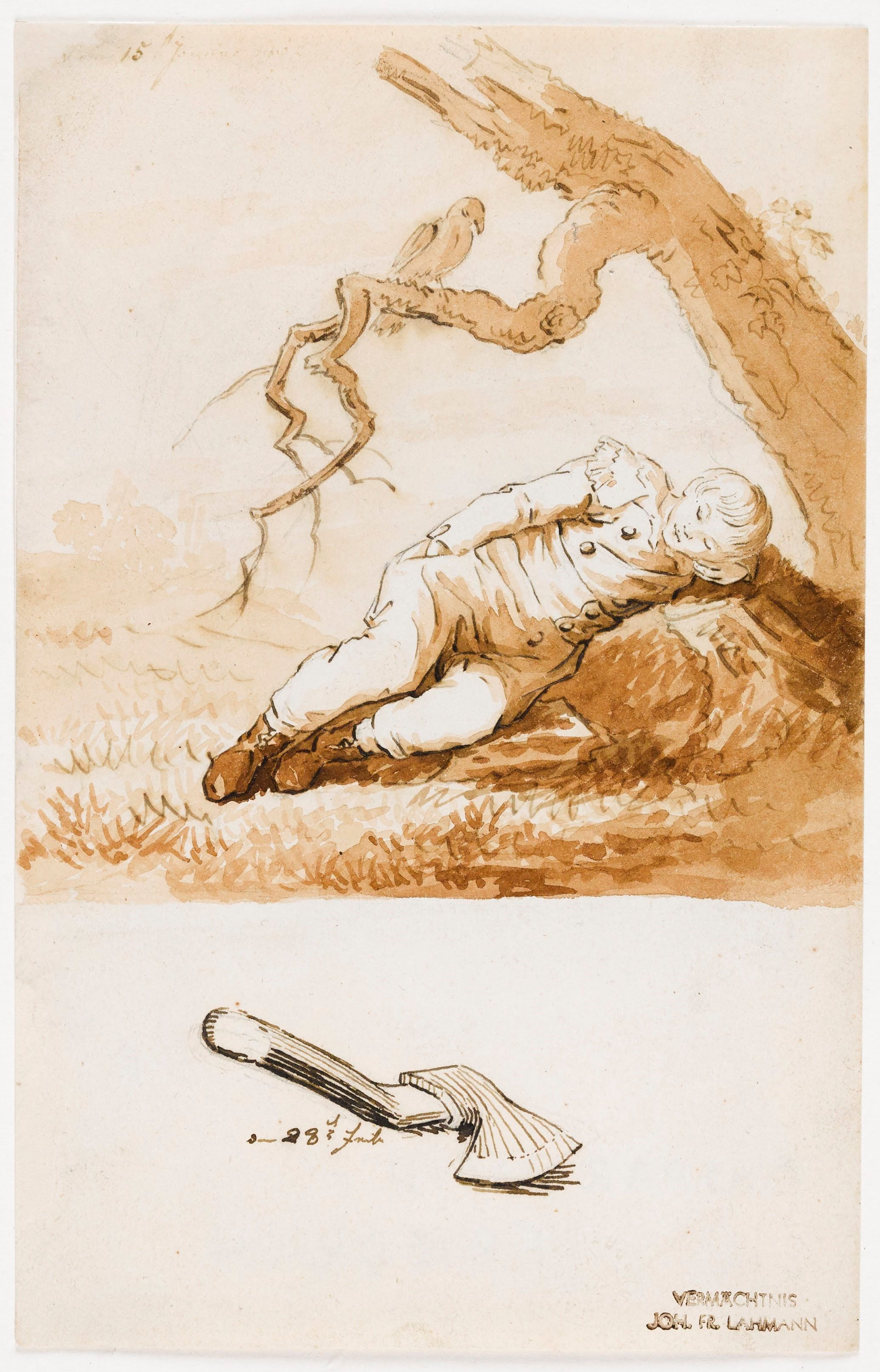
Sleeping Boy (Schlafender Knabe), c.1802, Kunsthalle Bremen

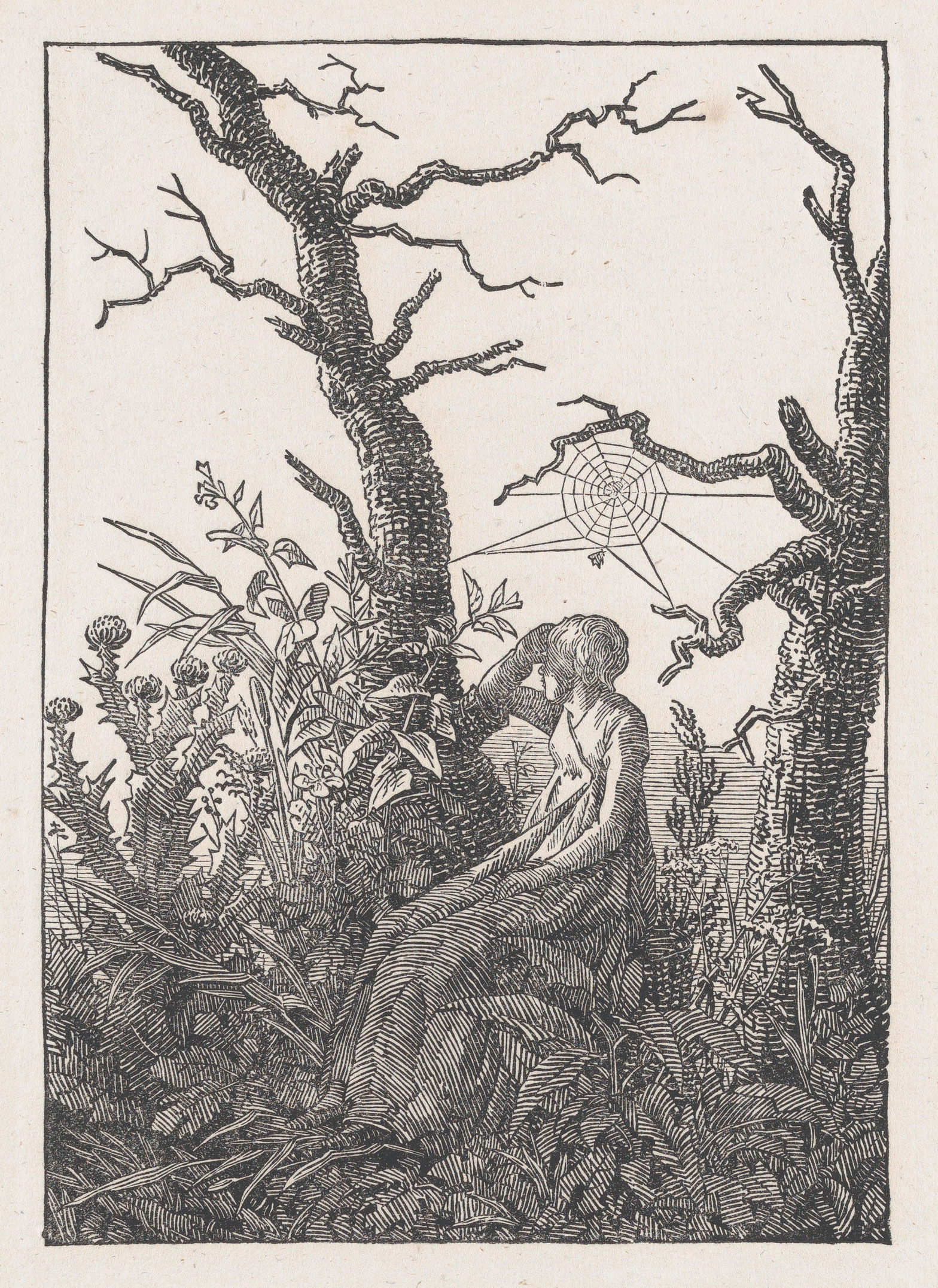
The Woman with the Spider's Web, 1803, Metropolitan Museum of Art

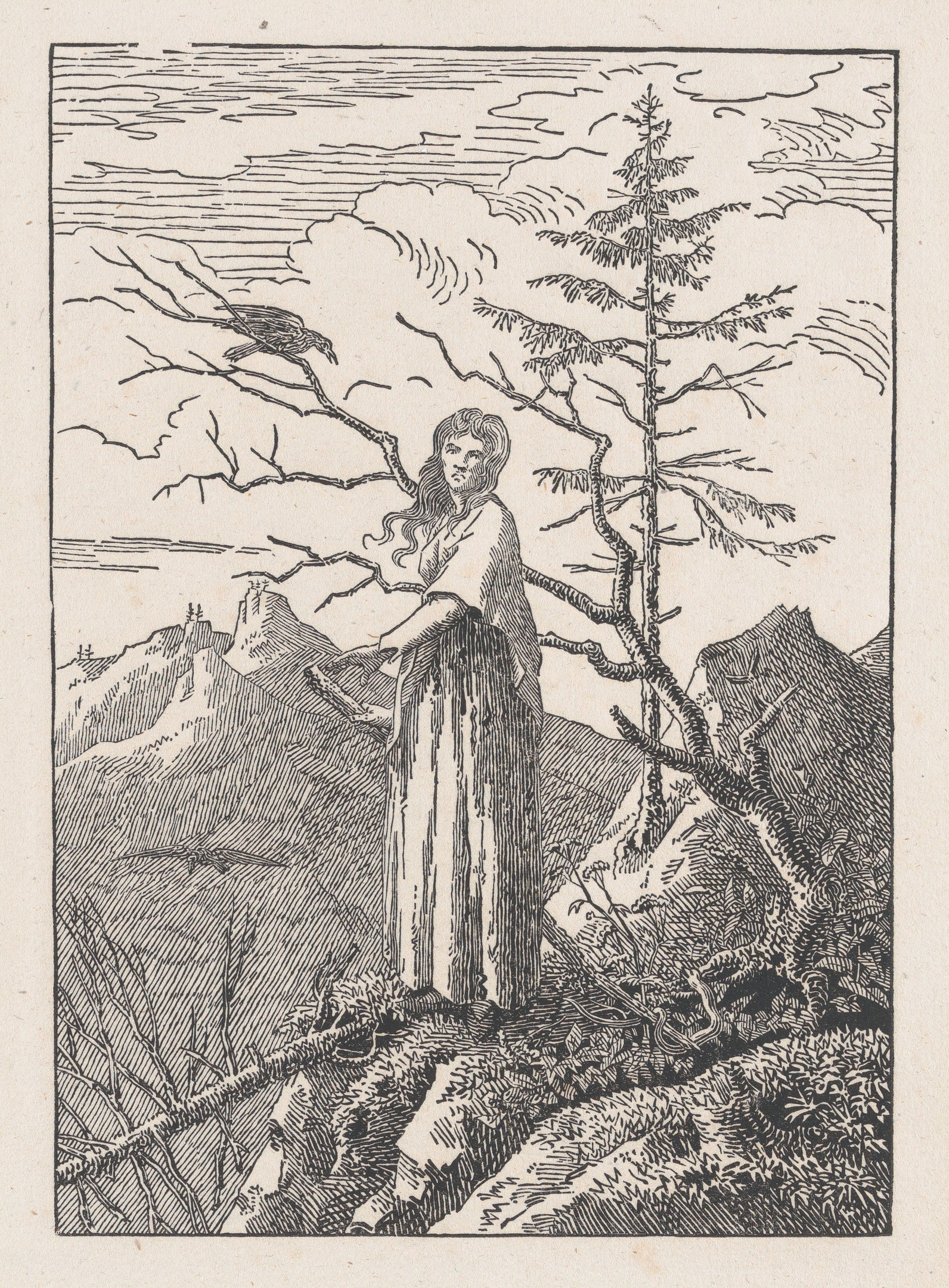
Woman with a Raven at an Abyss, 1803, Metropolitan Museum of Art

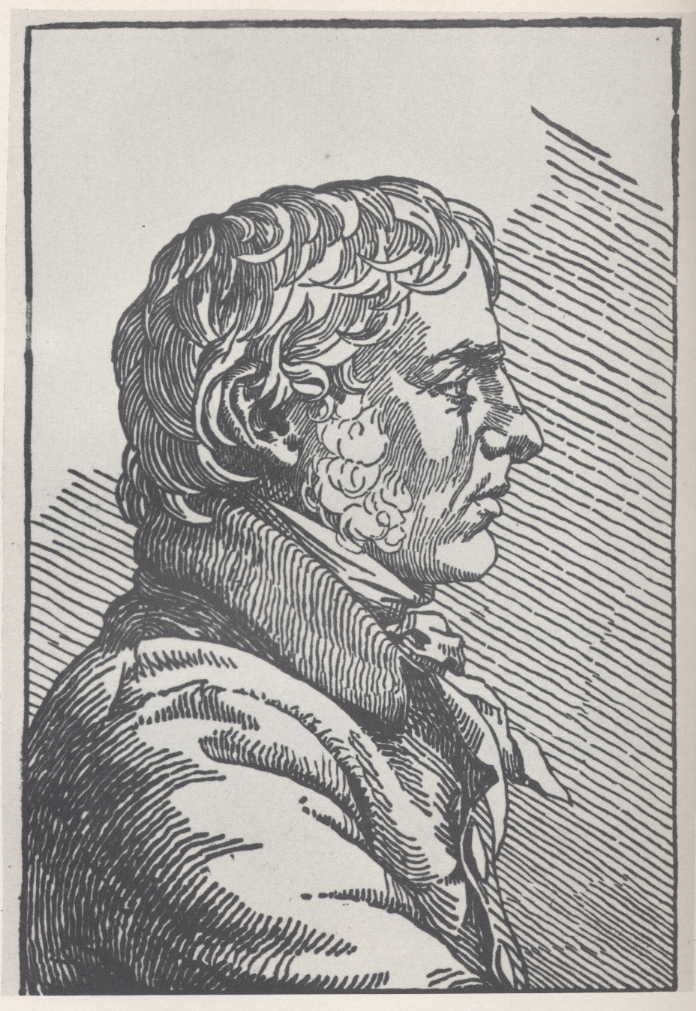
Self-portrait of Caspar David Friedrich, c.1802, Staatliche Kunstsammlungen Dresden

== See also ==
- List of works by Caspar David Friedrich
