= The Stages of Life =

Painting by Caspar David Friedrich

- Die Lebensstufen (German)
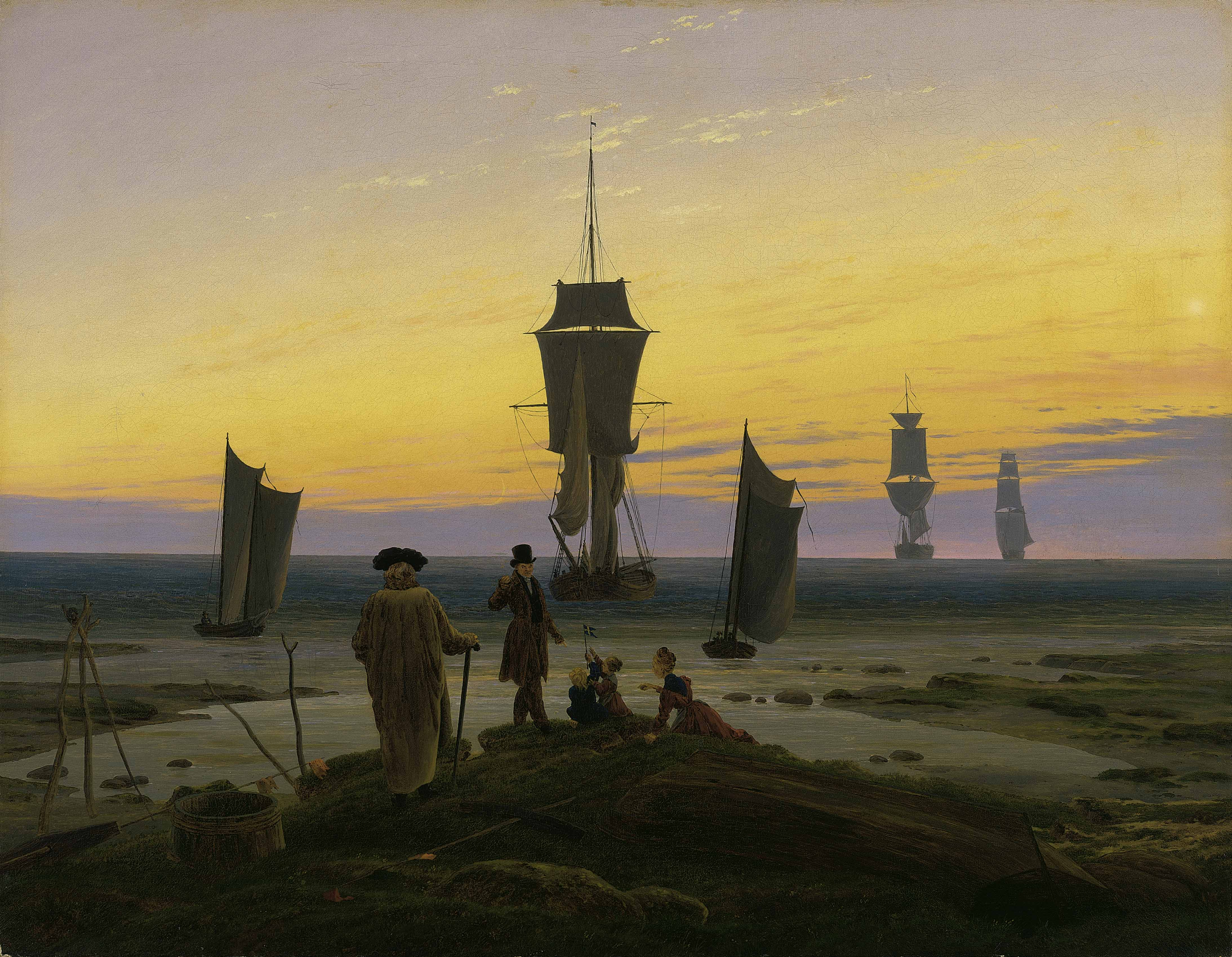
- Artist: Caspar David Friedrich
- Year: 1835
- Medium: Oil on canvas
- Dimensions: 72.5 cm × 94 cm (28.5 in × 37 in)
- Location: Museum der bildenden Künste, Leipzig

The Stages of Life (German: Die Lebensstufen) is an allegorical oil painting of 1835 by the German Romantic landscape painter Caspar David Friedrich. Completed just five years before his death, this picture, like many of his works, forms a meditation both on his own mortality and on the transience of life.

The painting is set on a sea shore and shows in the foreground an aged man with his back turned to the viewer, walking towards two adults and two children on a hilltop overlooking a harbour. The figures are echoed by five ships shown in the harbour, each at a different distance from the shore, an allegorical reference to the various stages of human life, to the end of a journey, to the closeness of death.

Although many of Friedrich's paintings are set in imagined landscapes, The Stages of Life is recognisably located at Utkiek, near his birthplace of Greifswald in today's northeastern Germany. The figures have been identified as Friedrich and his family. The aged man is the artist himself, the young boy his son Gustav Adolf, the young girl his daughter Agnes Adelheid, the older girl his daughter Emma, and the man in the top hat is his nephew Johann Heinrich.

== Description ==
The painting depicts a Baltic Sea port in the dusk. On the sea, three sailing ships returning home can be seen. The large ship in the middle has already begun to draw in its sails. Two smaller sailboats have almost reached land. The one on the right heads directly for the group of five people on the bank, who, by their clothes, are recognisable as townspeople. In their midst sits a boy who holds up a Swedish pennant, while the girl beside him reaches for it. To their right sits a woman who leans toward both children with her right hand raised.

These five figures correspond to the five ships visible in the harbour beyond. The three groupings of figures (one aged man, two adults, and two children) echo the positioning of the ships at various distances from the shore as allegorical of the stages of life, and closeness to death. The central ship is thought to represent the mother, while further inshore, two small boats—references to the two children—have only just begun their voyage and still remain in shallow, clear water. To the horizon, the furthest ship disappears into the setting horizon, likely symbolizing the aged man's voyage from this life into the unknown.

Alternatively, other critics have interpreted the two ships in the distance as the mother and father sailing off to live their lives and gain experience and wisdom as parents, and the large ship closest to the shore as the old man—one who has lived a full life, built up many experiences, and is finally pulling into the harbor at the end of life.

The group forms a semicircle: the children are on its furthest point; to their left and right are a younger man and the young woman. On the extreme left an older man stands looking straight ahead, outside the circle. The women and children are dressed for summer, while the old man wears a coat and a fur hat. The bow of the big ship in the middle is exactly aligned with the two children.

== Swedish pennant ==
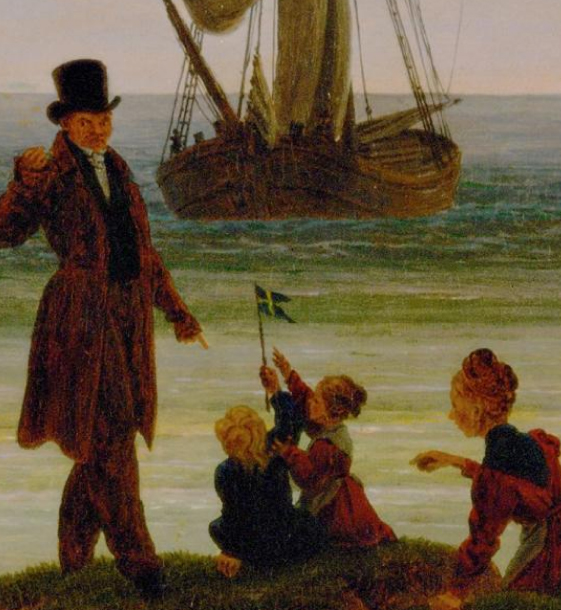
Detail of center section, showing children with the Swedish flag

Friedrich's home town of Greifswald belonged to the Duchy of Pomerania until 1630, when the area passed to Sweden as Swedish Pomerania. In 1815, it became part of Prussian Province of Pomerania. The painting shows Friedrich's younger daughter Agnes Adelheid and his son Gustav Adolf holding a Swedish pennant 20 years after the cession of Greifswald to Prussia. The view encompasses the peninsula in front of the Baltic Sea, beyond which lies Sweden. Friedrich christened his son Gustav Adolf, after the Swedish king Gustav Adolf IV. Swedish writer Per Daniel Amadeus Atterbom wrote of the painter,

Friedrich is a Pomeranian … and considers himself half-Swedish"

== Title ==
In keeping with the Romantic ideals of the time, Friedrich intended his paintings to function purely in visual terms, and thus he was cautious that the titles given to his work were not overly descriptive or evocative. It is likely that the relatively literal title The Stages of Life was not given by the artist himself, but the work was instead renamed during a revival of interest in the artist in the late 19th or early 20th century.

== See also ==
- List of works by Caspar David Friedrich
