= Mountain Landscape with Rainbow =

Painting by Caspar David Friedrich

- Gebirgslandschaft mit Regenbogen (German)
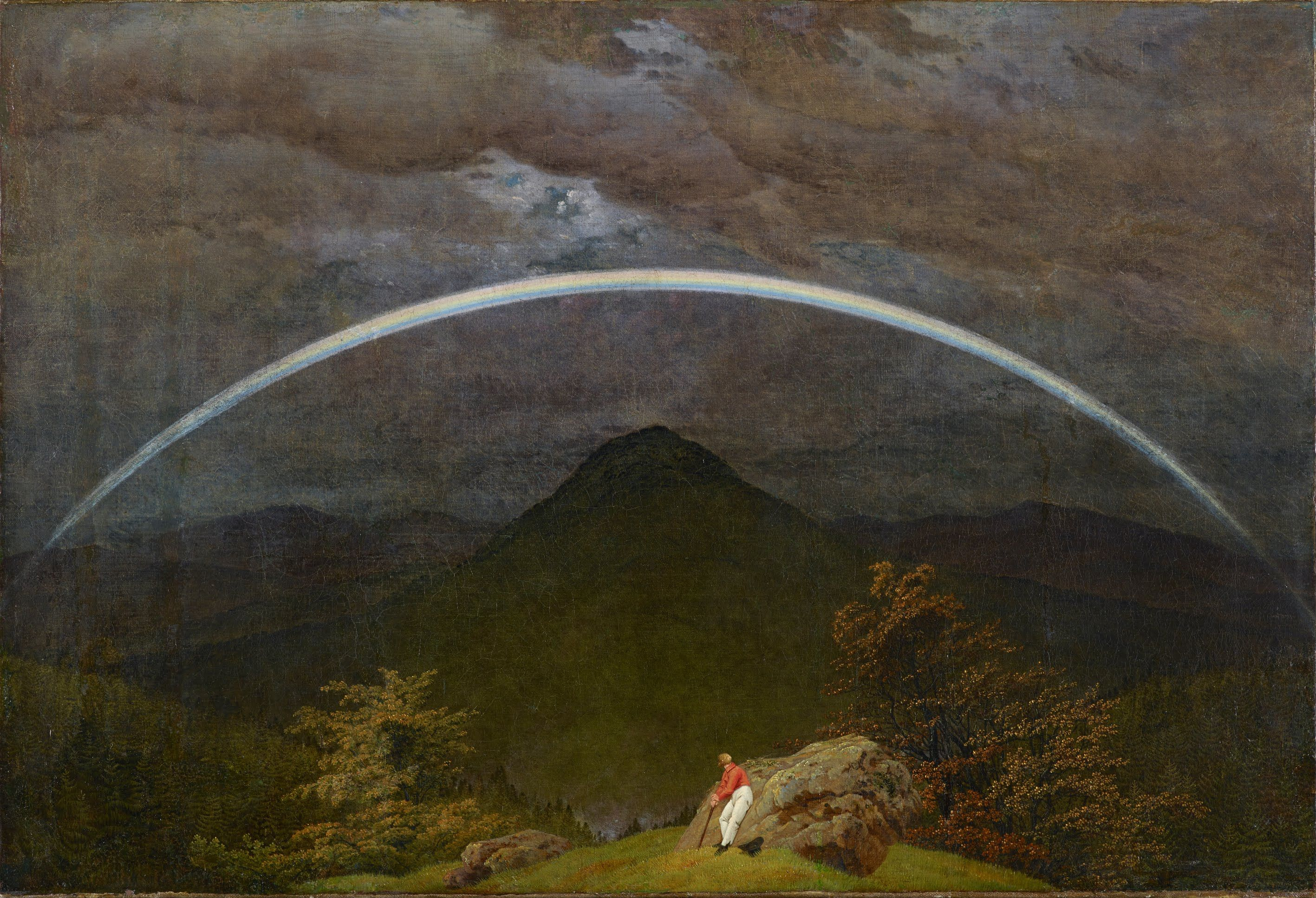
- Artist: Caspar David Friedrich
- Year: 1809–10
- Medium: Oil on canvas
- Dimensions: 70 cm × 102 cm (27.5 in × 40.1 in)
- Location: Museum Folkwang, Essen

Mountain Landscape with Rainbow (German: Gebirgslandschaft mit Regenbogen), is an oil painting by the German Romantic artist Caspar David Friedrich, from 1809–1810. Depicting a traveler who has stopped to view a mountainous landscape with a rainbow shining above, the painting was inspired by Friedrich's travels through Germany and along the shores of the Baltic Sea in 1809. Influenced by the Romantic values of subjective experience, Friedrich portrays a figure enraptured by the sublimity of nature.

In 1810, the painting was purchased together with other pictures by Duke Carl August of Saxe-Weimar. Today, Mountain Landscape with Rainbow is held in the Folkwang Museum in Essen, Germany.

== Background ==
Friedrich was one of the leading artists of the German Romantic movement, which emphasized emotion, spirituality, and individual experience. He believed subjectivity was an essential part of being an artist, writing "the artist's law is feeling. Pure feeling can never contradict nature but is always in harmony with her" and that it was important to "close your physical eye" and "see your painting with the spiritual eye."

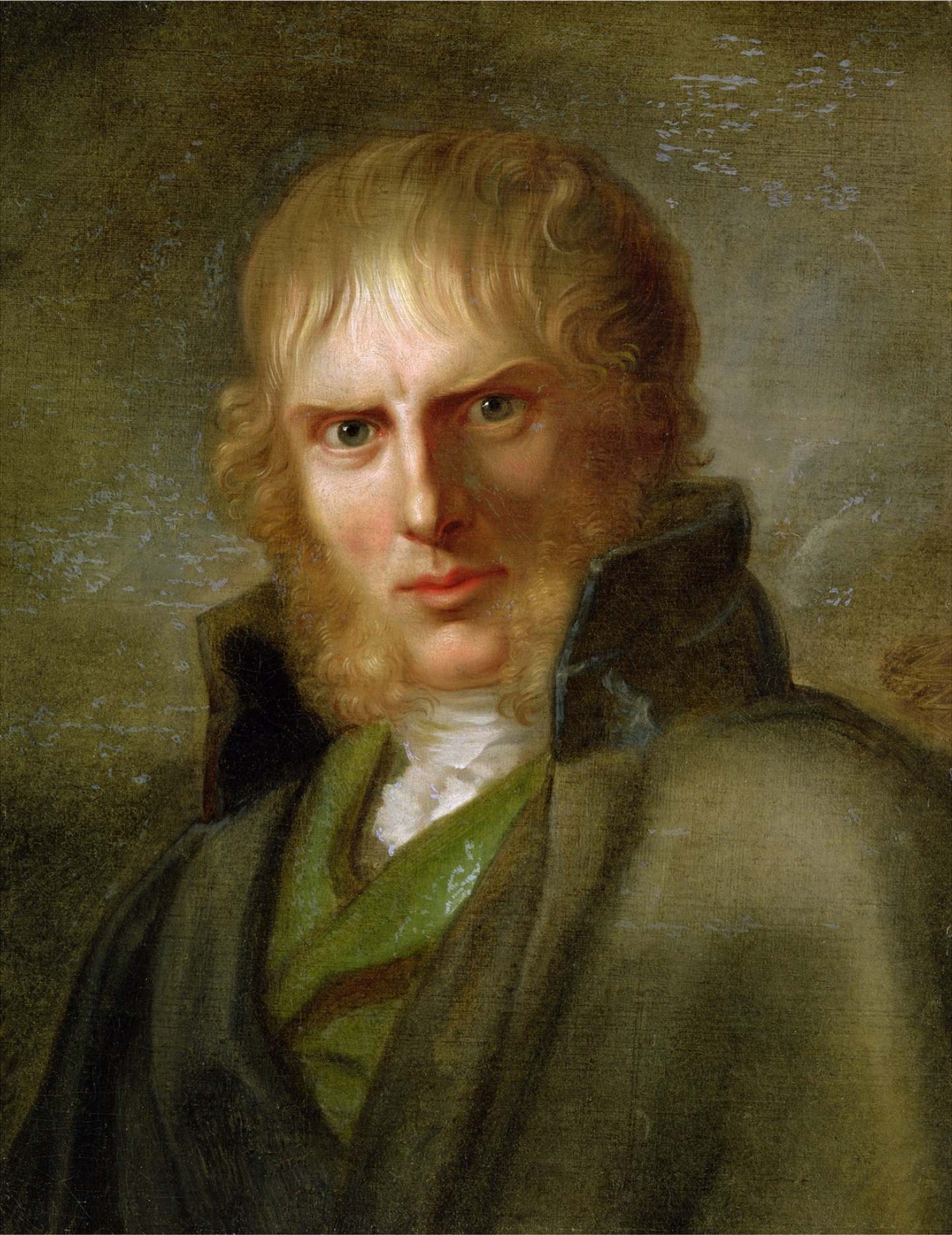
Gerhard von Kügelgen, Caspar David Friedrich, c. 1808

He is best known for his preoccupation with portraying the beauty and sublime power of nature through landscape paintings, often with a religious undercurrent. As a devout Protestant, Friedrich was inspired by the writings of Ludwig Gotthard Kosegarten (1758–1810), a pastor-poet who preached that divinity could be experienced through one’s personal experience of nature, in which the manifestation of God can be found. Kosegarten’s use of imagery directly inspired by the Baltic coast in his poems and sermons especially connected with Friedrich, who was born and raised in the German northeastern region of Pomerania, which borders the Baltic Sea. Friedrich channeled a similar religious reverence for nature into his paintings, such as The Monk by the Sea. He was recognized as a trailblazer in Romantic art for these works, which were said to have a distinct “Kosegartian effect” by German poet Heinrich von Kleist.

Connected to his dedication to Romantic ideals such as individual experience and subjectivity, Friedrich is also famous for his use of the visual motif of the Rückenfigur in his landscape paintings, a figure in the foreground of the painting who turns his back toward the viewer and looks at nature. A famous example of this is in Friedrich’s 1818 painting, Wanderer above the Sea of Fog. The painting’s viewer is meant to identify with the Rückenfigur, as they are both spectators of the landscape. The Rückenfigur further defines the landscape as a perceived and experienced through an individual perspective rather than an objective one.

== Composition and analysis ==
In Mountain Landscape with Rainbow, Friedrich represents nature as a product of the artist’s individual inner experience of the world. He indicates this personal dimension by painting a Rückenfigur in the foreground with similar physical features to himself, a blond man with bushy facial hair. The Rückenfigur’s gaze is hidden, allowing the viewer to identify with him and understand the painting’s landscape is being seen through his lens. The way the landscape completely engulfs the figure in size on the canvas also implies a sublime experience of nature.

The landscape is not a literal representation of ordinary nature. The rainbow, for example, exists in direct contradiction with nature, for it can only appear when its light source is behind the viewer. In Mountain Landscape with Rainbow, there are two sources of light: one being the sun illuminating the man in the foreground and the other being the moon shining through the clouds above the rainbow. Neither light source is in a position where it could cause the rainbow. Not only does this further characterize the landscape as a subjective personal experience of nature, but it also works to serve as a religious symbol.

The sharp contrast between the foreground and background—the illumination of the figure and the darkness of the mountainous valley—may symbolize the contradiction between two different planes of existence: the spiritual and physical. These two worlds are connected by a rainbow, which, according to Peter Russell, could be serving as an allusion to the rainbow in the Biblical account of Noah’s ark, representing the covenant between God and humanity. Raymond Lee suggests that the pale colors are likely meant as a symbolic contrast to the foreboding darkness, a symbol of God’s peace and promise in a symbolic representation of the valley of death. The rock the figure is leaning on may also contribute to the painting's religious themes, as Friedrich is known for using rocks to represent the solidity of Christian faith in his other paintings, such as in Cross in the Mountains.

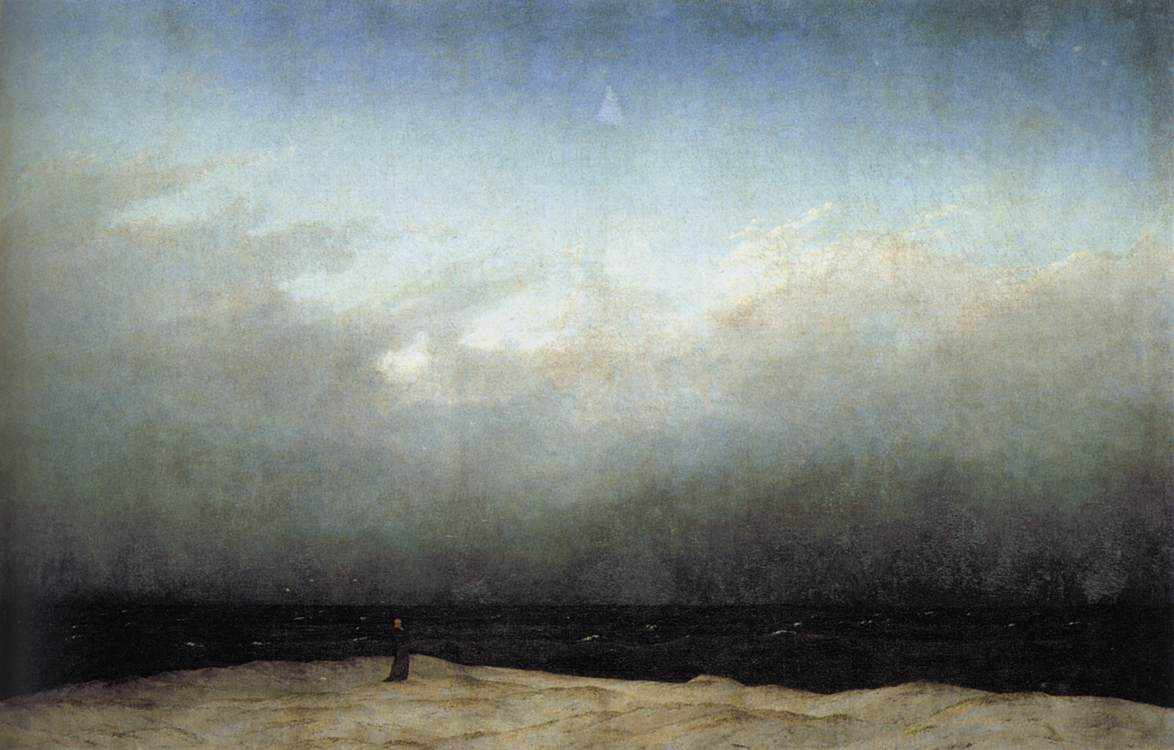
Friedrich, The Monk by the Sea, 1809

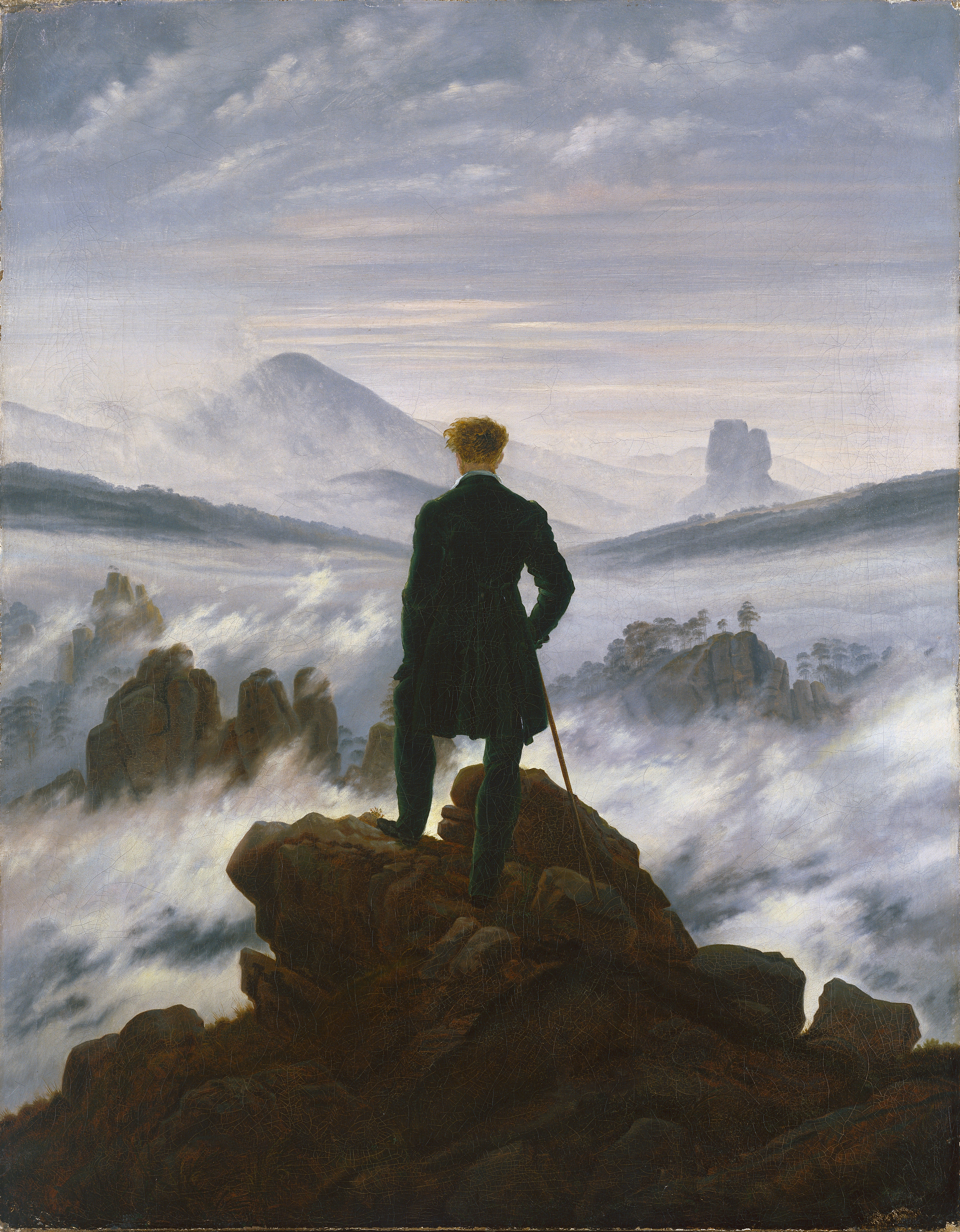
Friedrich, Wanderer above the Sea of Fog, 1818

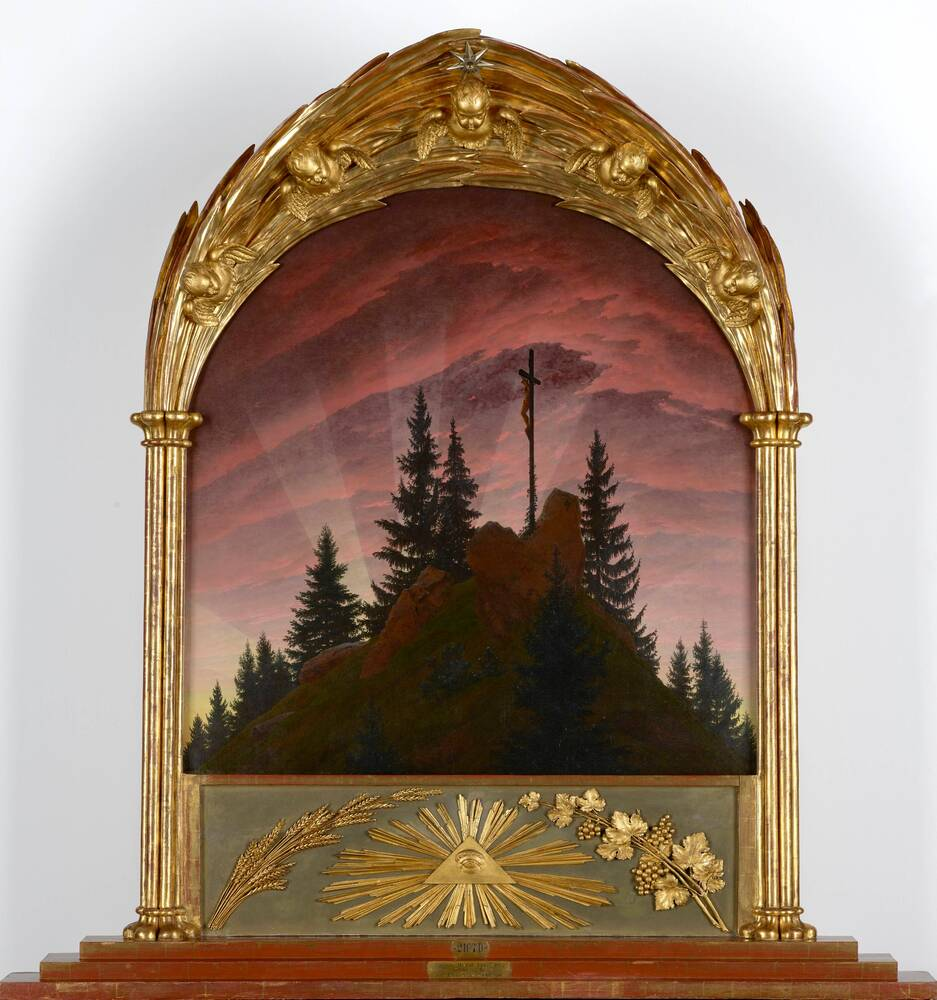
Friedrich, Cross in the Mountains, 1808

== See also ==
- List of works by Caspar David Friedrich
