= River Bank in Fog =

Painting by Caspar David Friedrich

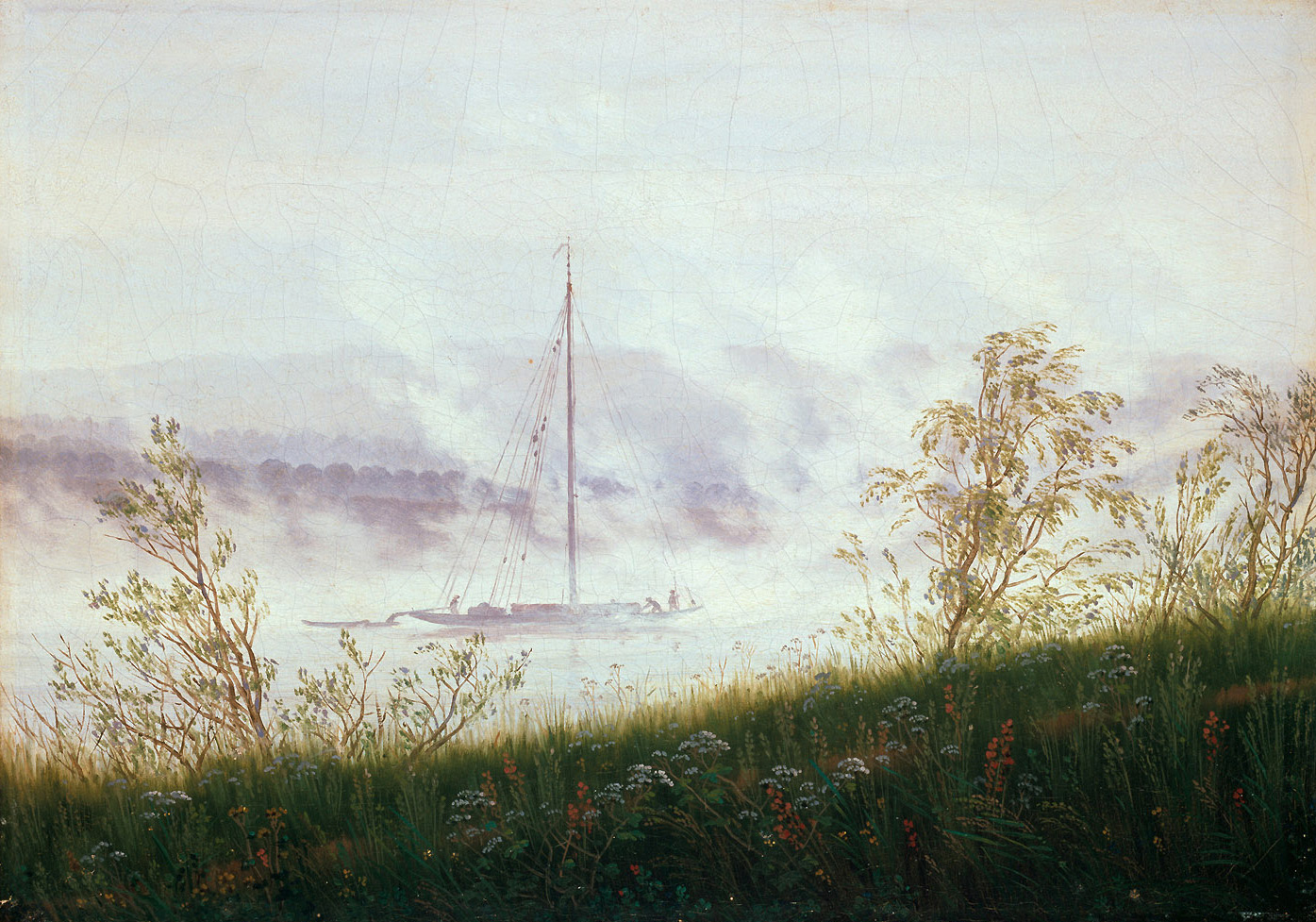
- Artist: Caspar David Friedrich
- Year: c. 1821
- Medium: oil on canvas
- Dimensions: 22 cm × 33.5 cm (8.7 in × 13.2 in)
- Location: Wallraf-Richartz-Museum & Fondation Corboud, Cologne

River Bank in Fog (German: Flussufer im Nebel) is a c. 1821 oil on canvas painting by Caspar David Friedrich, now in the Wallraf-Richartz-Museum & Fondation Corboud in Cologne, for which it was acquired in 1942 from the Graf Hahn collection at Schloss Basedow (Mecklenburg). It is also known as Elbschiff in Early Fog (Elbschiff im Frühnebel).

== Bibliography ==
- Grave, Johannes (2017) [2012]. Caspar David Friedrich (2nd ed.). London/New York: Prestel. ISBN 978-3-7913-8357-6, p. 242.
- Hofmann, Werner (1995). Das entzweite Jahrhundert, Kunst zwischen 1750 und 1830. Munich: C. H. Beck.
- Hagen, Rose-Marie and Rainer (2016). Bildbefragungen. Cologne: Taschen.

== Contemporary fog paintings by Friedrich ==
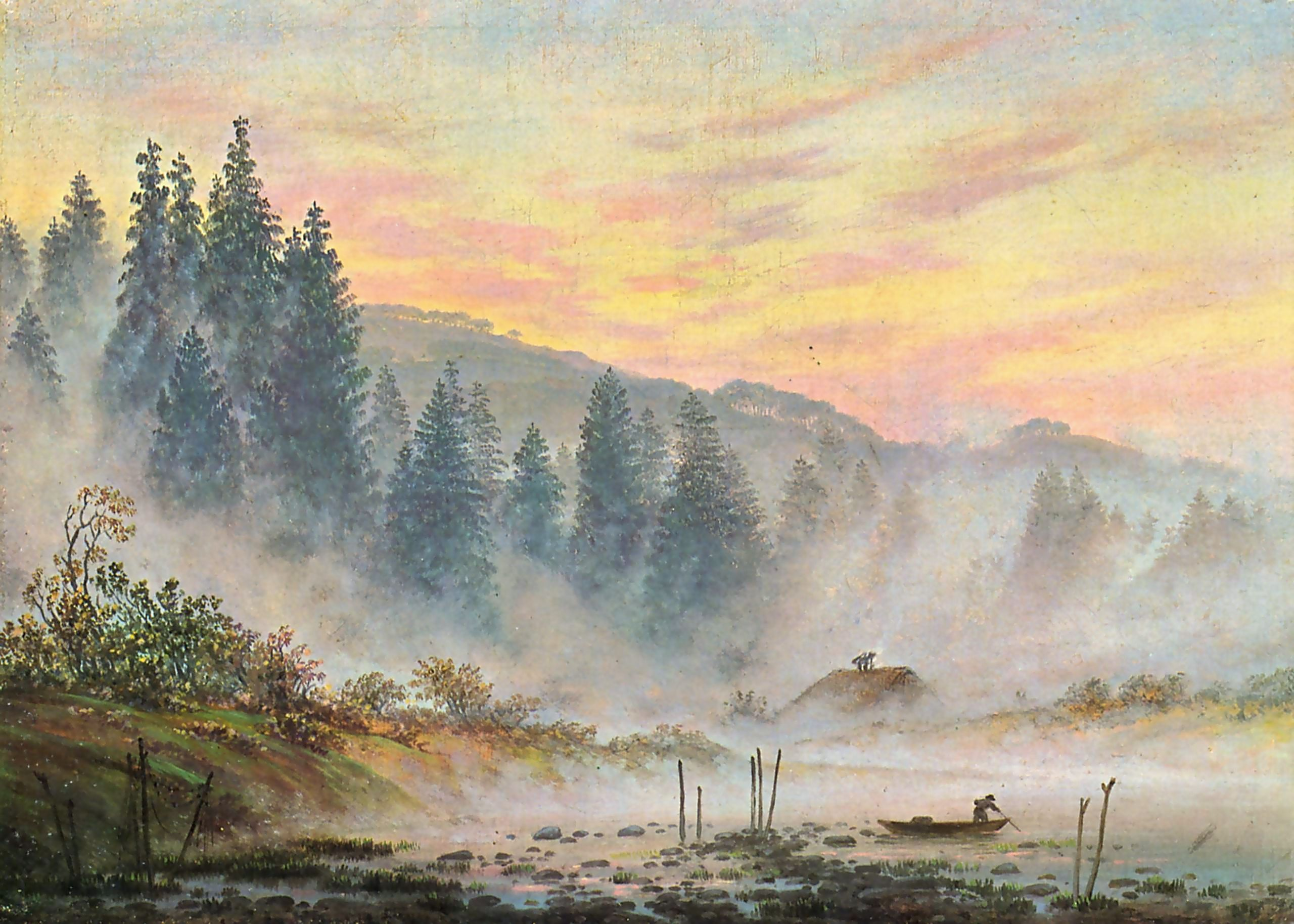
Caspar David Friedrich – Morning 1820, 22 × 30,5 cm, Niedersächsisches Landesmuseum Hannover

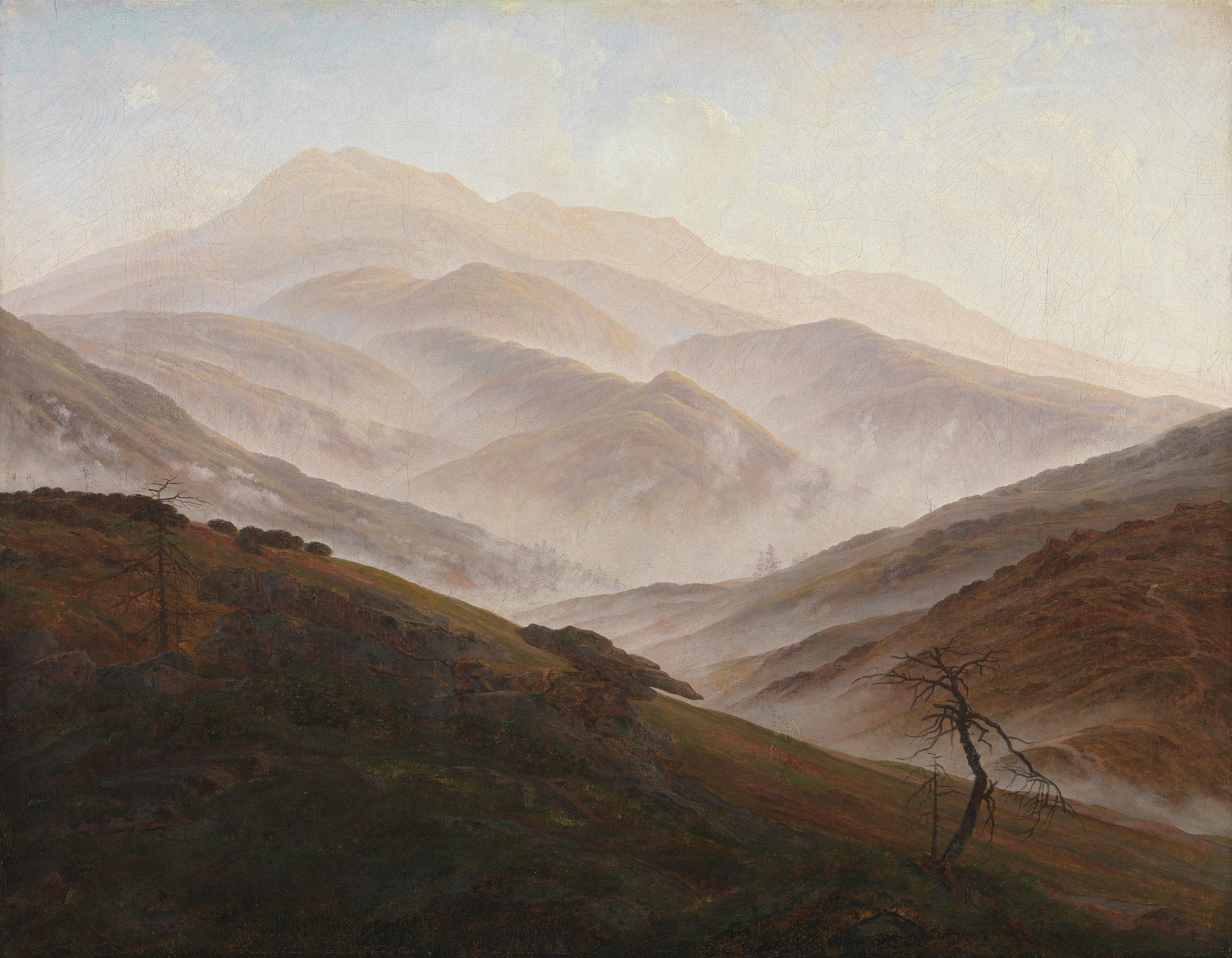
Caspar David Friedrich – Riesengebirg Landscape with Rising Fog 1819–1820, 54,9 × 70,4 cm, Neue Pinakothek München

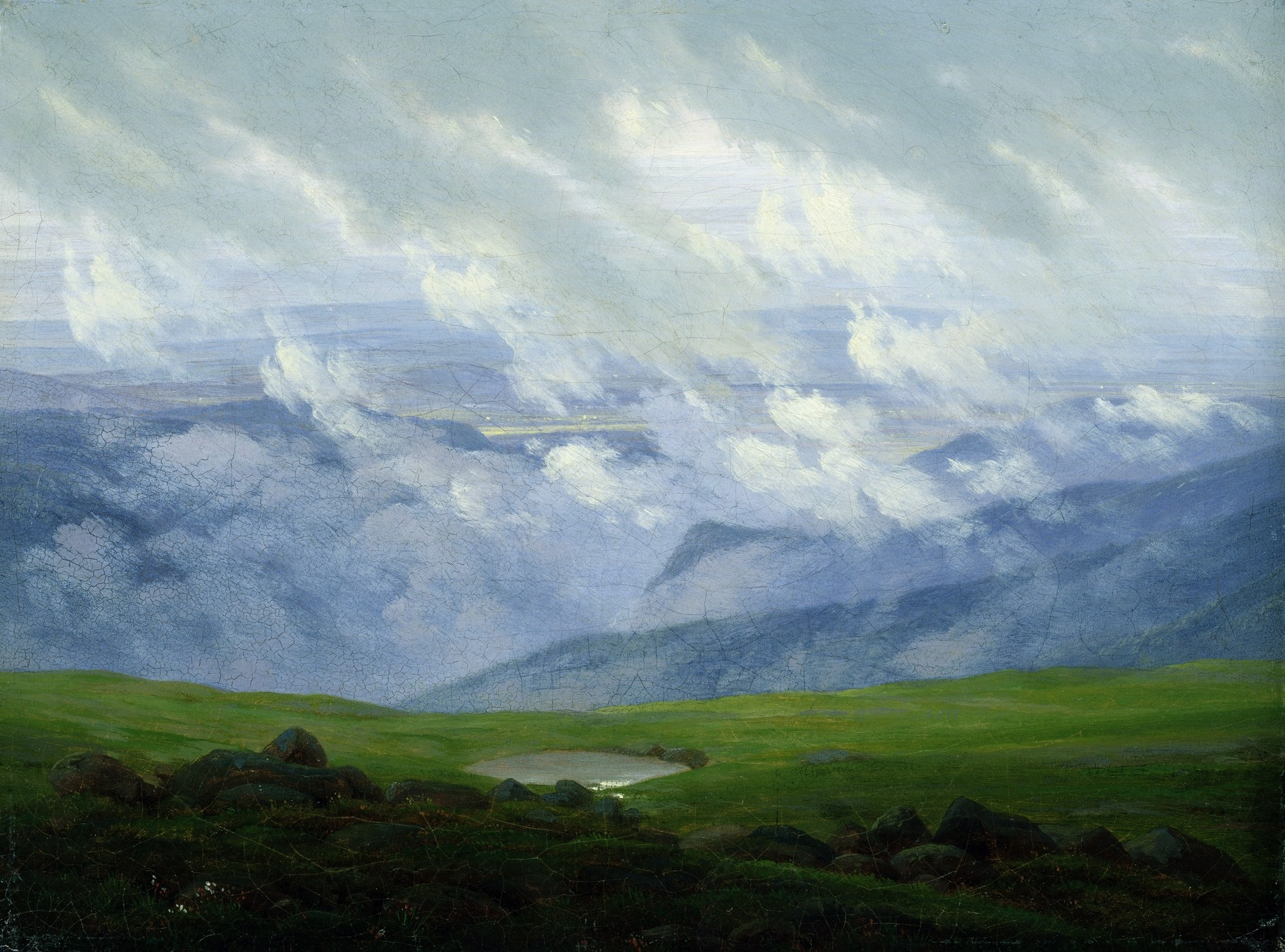
Caspar David Friedrich – Ziehende Wolken 1821, 18,3 × 24,5 cm, Kunsthalle Hamburg

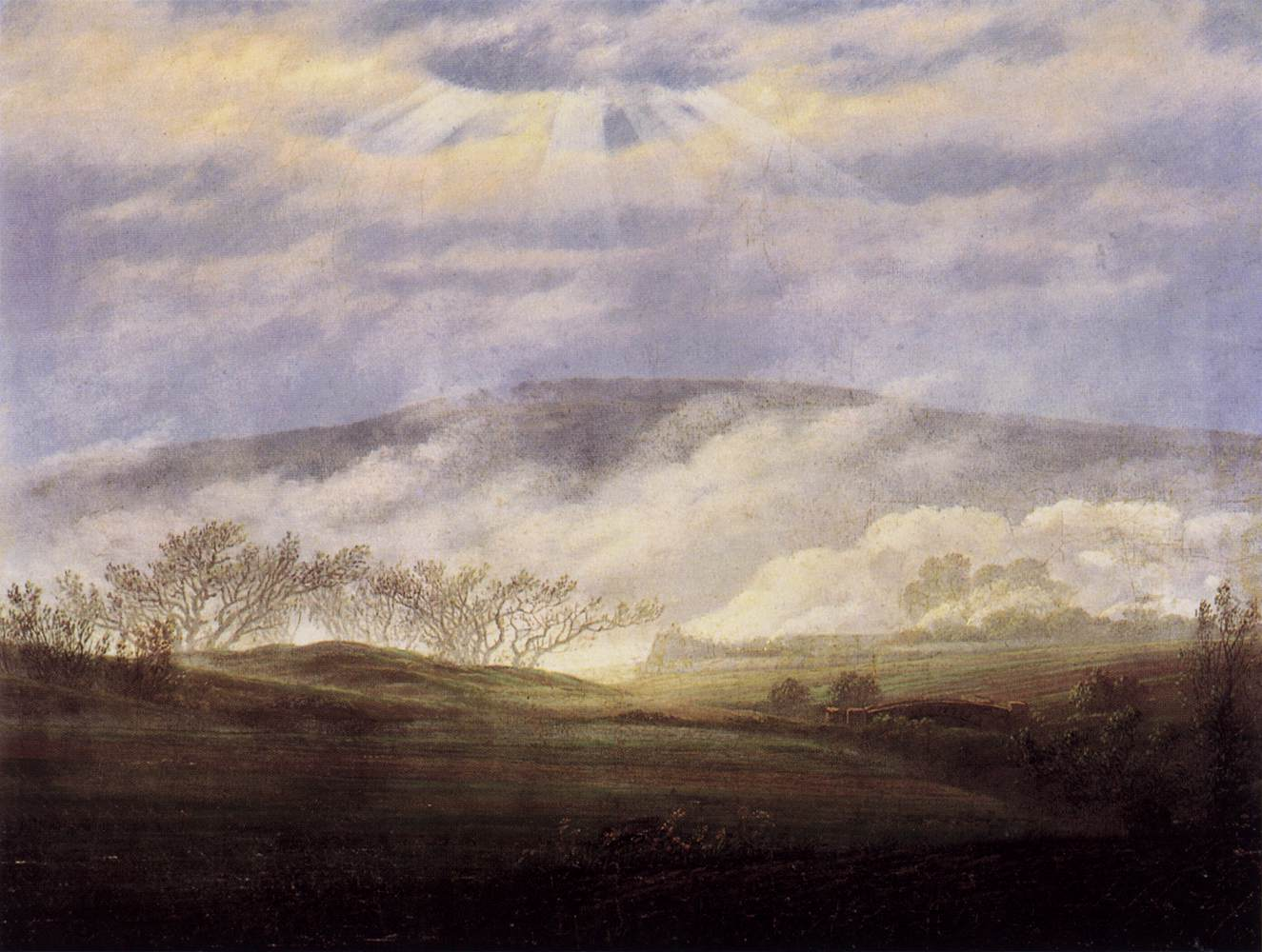
Caspar David Friedrich – Nebel im Elbtal 1821, 33 × 43 cm, Alte Nationalgalerie Berlin

== See also ==
- List of works by Caspar David Friedrich

== External links (in German) ==
- Lebenslauf von Caspar David Friedrich bei der Caspar-David-Friedrich-Gesellschaft
- Caspar David Friedrich: Poet der Landschaftsmalerei beim Norddeutschen Rundfunk
- Flussufer im Nebel bei www.wikiart.org
- Ausstellung im Wallraf-Richartz-Museum mit dem Gemälde
