= The Watzmann =

Painting by Caspar David Friedrich

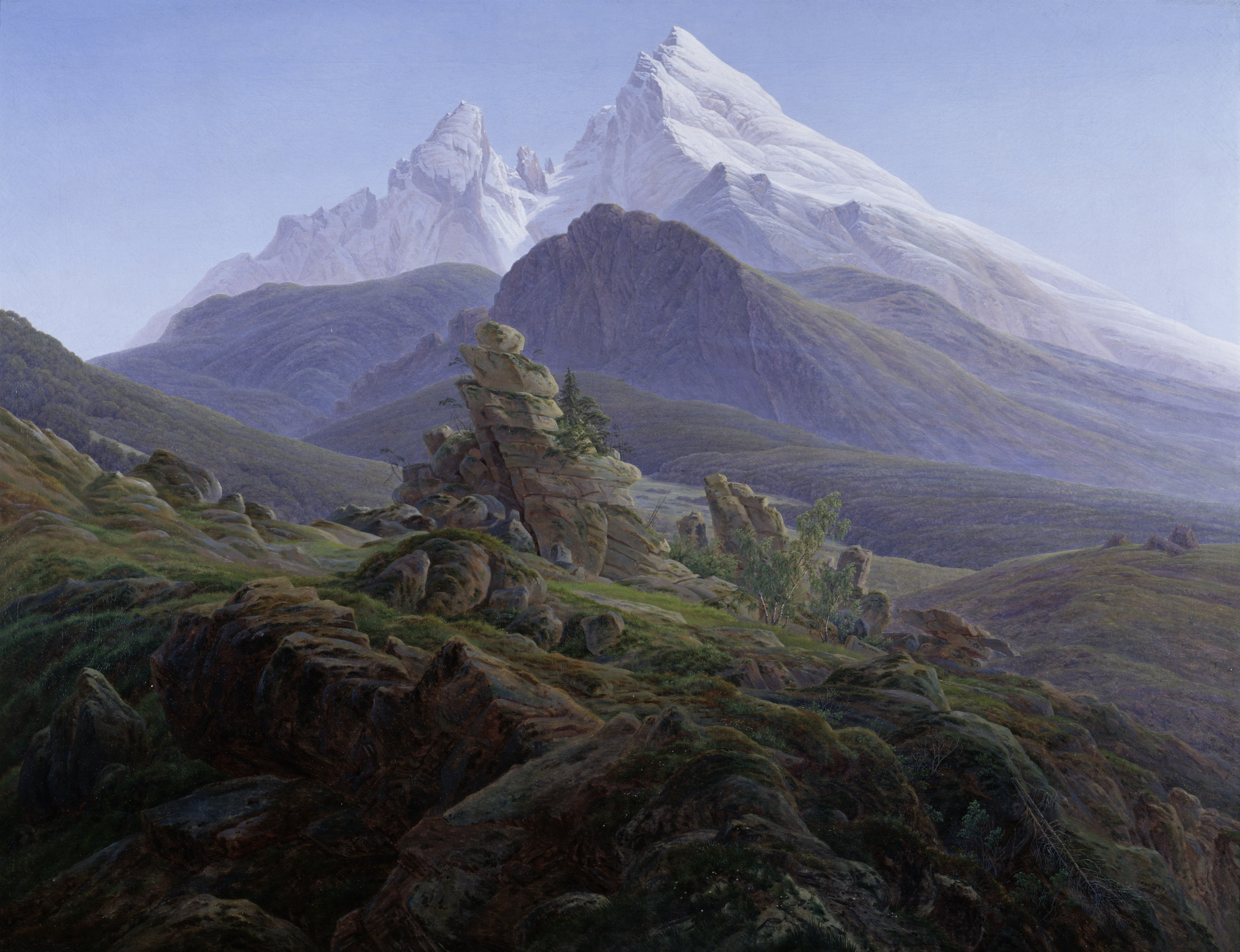
- Artist: Caspar David Friedrich
- Year: 1824–1825
- Medium: oil on canvas
- Dimensions: 136 cm × 170 cm (54 in × 67 in)
- Location: Alte Nationalgalerie, Berlin

The Watzmann (German - Der Watzmann) is an 1824–1825 oil on canvas painting by Caspar David Friedrich, showing the Watzmann mountain as seen from Berchtesgaden to the north-east. It is now on display in the Alte Nationalgalerie in Berlin.

It was acquired in 1832 by Senator Carl Friedrich Pogge von Greifswald, then later by Adolf Gustav Barthold Georg von Pressentin (1814–1879), who lived in Rostock. After von Pressentin's death it was acquired by Martin Brunn, a Jewish art collector who lived in Berlin. Nazi racial laws forced him to flee Germany and he sold it to the Alte Nationalgalerie in Berlin in 1937 for 25,000 reichsmarks to fund his family's escape to the USA. Hoping to display it in the Berghof, his home at Berchtesgaden, Adolf Hitler granted 10,000 reichsmarks towards the purchase price, but the state considered the painting to be part of the 'Jewish Property Tax' or 'Judenvermögensabgabe'. In 2002 the Prussian Cultural Heritage Foundation and Brunn's heirs negotiated a compromise, whereby the DekaBank was allowed to buy the painting from his heirs for less than its market value (with the Kulturstiftung der Länder as an intermediary) and then place it back in the Nationalgalerie as a long-term loan.

== See also ==
- List of works by Caspar David Friedrich
