= Two Men by the Sea =

Painting by Caspar David Friedrich

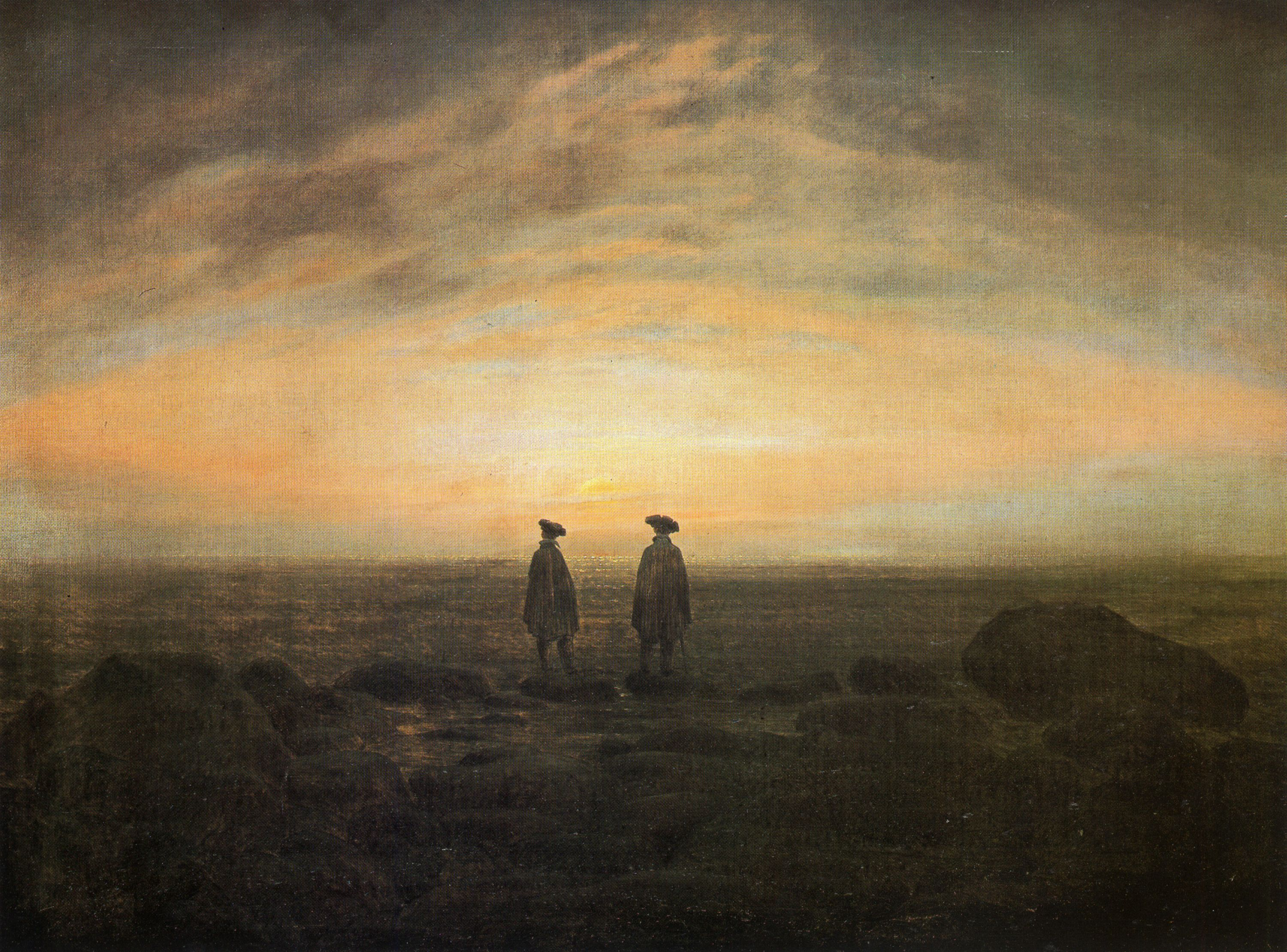
- Artist: Caspar David Friedrich
- Year: 1817
- Medium: oil on canvas
- Dimensions: 51 cm × 66 cm (20 in × 26 in)
- Location: Alte Nationalgalerie, Berlin

Two Men by the Sea (German: Zwei Männer am Meer) is a painting by Caspar David Friedrich, first exhibited at the exhibition held by the Dresden Academy of Fine Arts in 1817, from which it was acquired a representative of mother superior Maria Richter of Berlin. It first appears in the inventories of the Nationalgalerie in 1936 as number A II 884 (or NG H 5). It was displayed at the Schloss Charlottenburg until 1967 and from 1986 to 2001 it was hung in the Schloss' Knobelsdorff wing. Since 2001 it has been displayed in the Alte Nationalgalerie in Berlin.

== See also ==
- List of works by Caspar David Friedrich
