= Sunset (Friedrich) =

Painting by Caspar David Friedrich

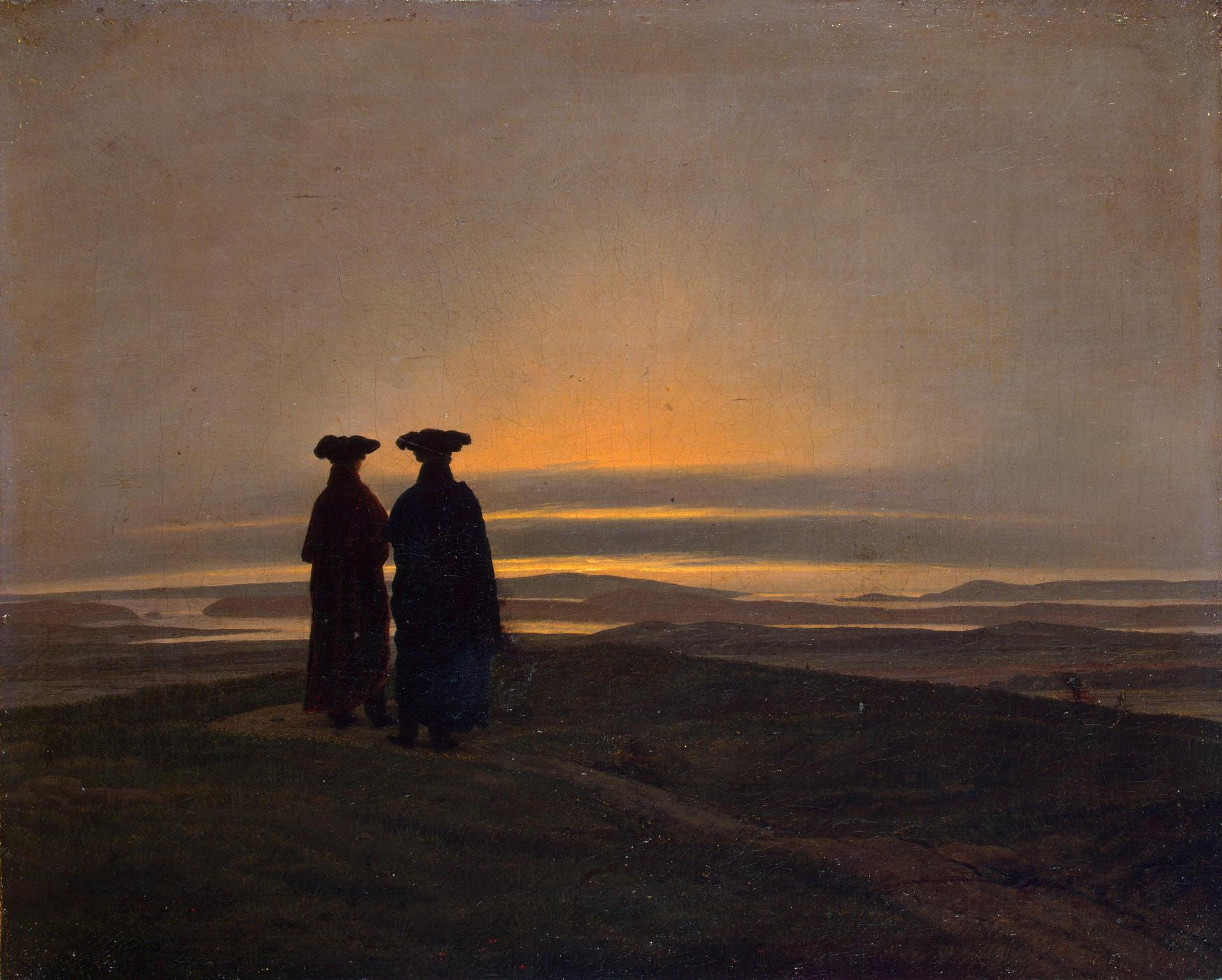
- Artist: Caspar David Friedrich
- Year: 1830–1835
- Medium: oil on canvas
- Dimensions: 25 cm × 31 cm (9.8 in × 12 in)
- Location: Hermitage Museum, St Petersburg

Sunset or Brothers is an oil painting on canvas created ca. 1830–1835 by the German artist Caspar David Friedrich, now in the Hermitage Museum, in St Petersburg, Russia.

== Description and analysis ==
The painting depicts two men looking at a seascape during sunset. In this work, as in many others, Friedrich paints the figures seen from behind, so that they are seen contemplating the sea, from the viewer's point of view.

The two wayfarers are both dressed in a similar traditional German costume, they also appear similar, representing the common experience that they are living. At the end of their journey, they observe, enraptured and motionless, the nature and the deep space that is visible before their eyes. Their image constitutes, in the painting, the element of union between the earth, the sea and the sky.

In the painting, the characters are depicted immersed in the contemplation of the landscape towards which both are turned. However, it is a landscape that is shown to their gaze but that, at least in their earthly dimension, they can only admire without physically reaching it. The path they have walked, visible on the right of the painting, ends in fact at the point where they have stopped.

The work therefore suggests a great sense of melancholy; however, the entire composition and, in particular, the light of twilight also suggest the possibility of an afterlife, of a fusion of man with nature.

== See also ==
- List of works by Caspar David Friedrich
