= The Great Enclosure =

Painting by Caspar David Friedrich

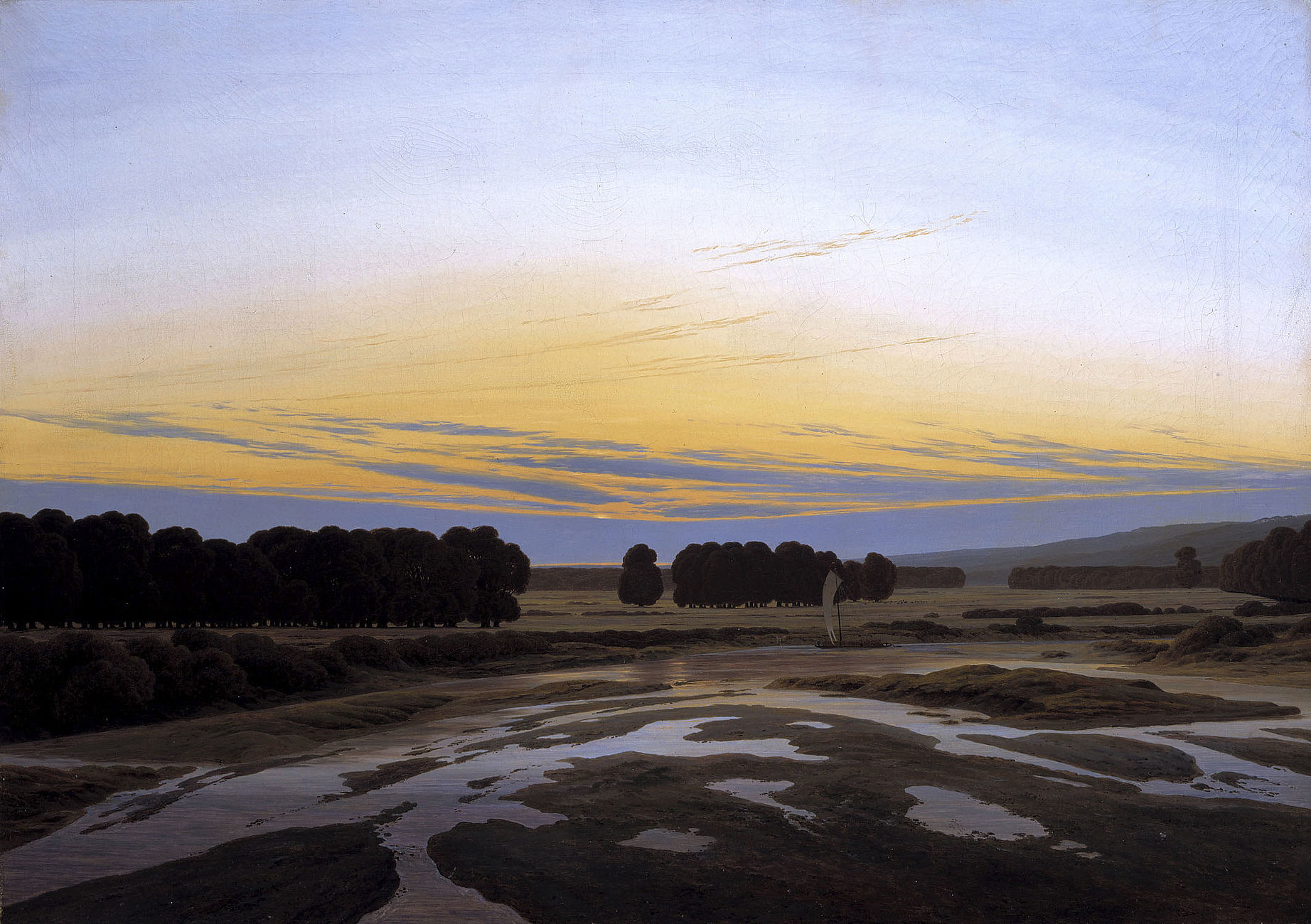
- Artist: Caspar David Friedrich
- Year: 1831
- Medium: Oil on canvas
- Dimensions: 73.5 cm × 102.5 cm (28.9 in × 40.4 in)
- Location: Galerie Neue Meister, Dresden

The Great Enclosure (German - Das Große Gehege) or The Ostra Enclosure (Ostra-Gehege) is an 1831 oil-on-canvas painting by Caspar David Friedrich, now in the collection of the Albertinum of the Galerie Neue Meister, in Dresden.

The Great Enclosure depicts a late summer sunset over the Elbe and the surrounding land, as the sun shines its last light, spreading blue and yellows over the expansive sky. The work is regarded as unique in its accurate yet surreal depiction of the sunset. The art historian Werner Busch has described it as the "crowning achievement of Friedrich's late work."

== Background ==
Friedrich was one of the preeminent artists of German Romanticism, a movement which emphasized subjectivity and spirituality over strict intellectualism and objectivity. Friedrich's art often focused on the spirituality of nature through close attention to local scenery in landscape painting.

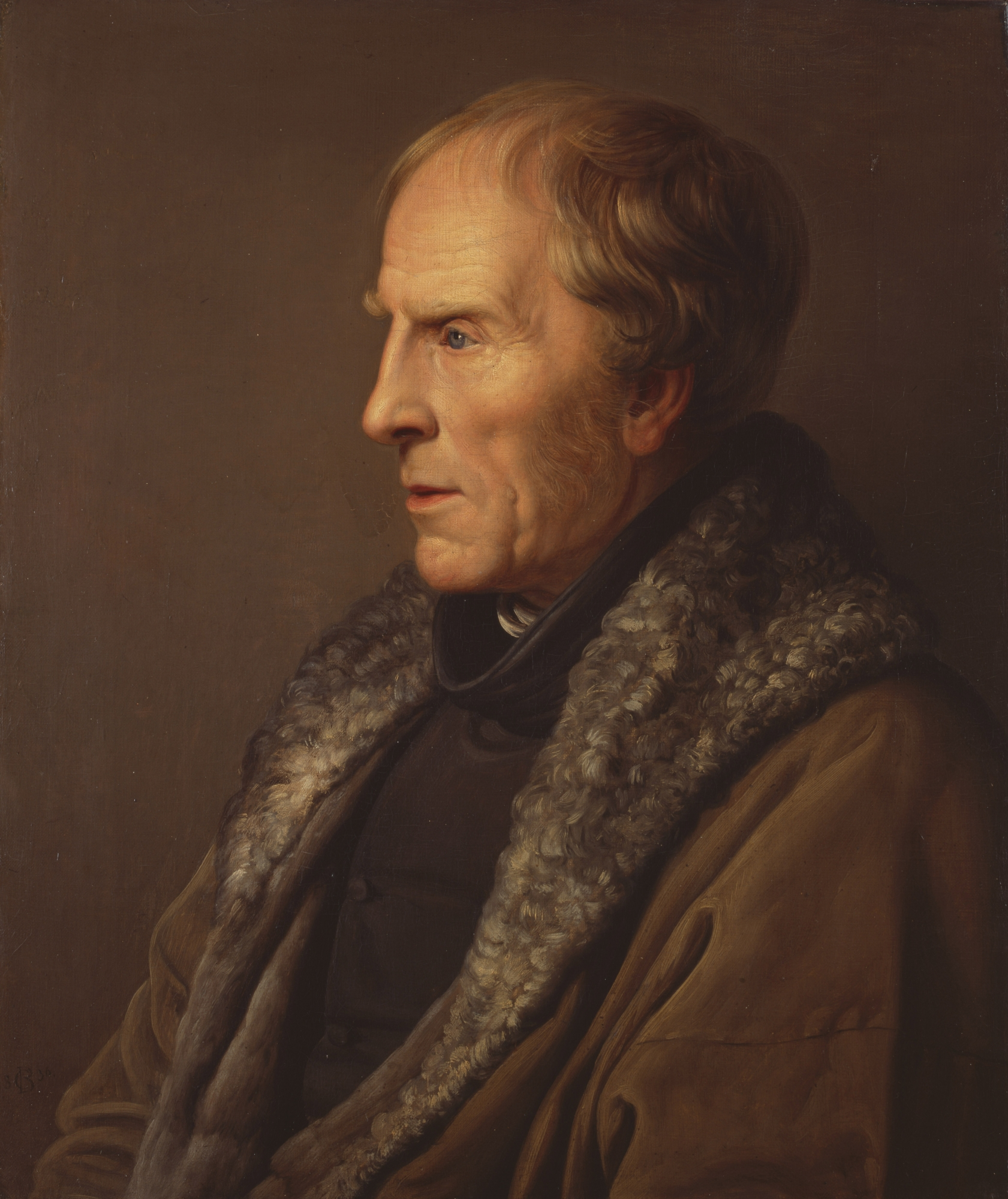
Carl Johann Baehr: Portrait of Caspar David Friedrich, 1836

Friedrich's contemporary Ludwig Tieck noted that Friedrich strived "to evoke a certain feeling, a definitive attitude with precise thoughts and concepts which merge with sadness and solemnity. Thus he tries to introduce allegory and symbolism in light and shadow, in Nature living and dead, in snow and water." Despite this allegorical conception of nature, however, Friedrich remained attentive to real moments of the natural world that he had experienced.

Friedrich especially explored the awe-inspiring effect of natural landscape on the human viewer, examining how subjective experience affects perception. As he wrote, "The artist should paint not only what he sees before him, but also what he sees within him."

== Composition and analysis ==
The Great Enclosure depicts the floodplain area adjacent to the Elbe river, located four kilometers northwest of Dresden, known as the Ostra Enclosure. The oil painting Sketch of the Great Enclosure likely served as the preliminary study for this work. The Great Enclosure represents the horizontal expanse of the Ostra Enclosure while capturing the intersecting curves of the sky above, towering over the water pools and ground, painted in chiaroscuro. German art historian Willi Wolfradt suggests that this curvature of the sky begins in the grove in the distance and is mirrored in the form of the sandbanks. Werner Hofmann sees the sky converging in a central hyperbola that creates an ethereal effect. In this way, the physical and cosmic become intertwined, the vast sky of heaven marrying the earthly world.

The vantage point of the viewer is elevated above the ground, implying a position on a bridge over the river. The heightened position also has allegorical resonances, suggesting that the viewer travels from the natural to the spiritual world. This theme of transition is further emphasized by the transitory period of twilight, as well as the barren foreground and muted tones of the muddy earth and large puddles, which reflect the heavens above.

The only sign of human presence in the scene is the ship situated on the river. The position of the ship indicates that it is moving toward the viewer. The diminutive size of the ship relative to the vast landscape suggests that human influence is having a small effect on the greatness of the natural world. This feeling of nature's magnitude and the colors of the sunset accentuate the themes of mortality and spiritual transcendence for the Christian believer.

Inspired by The Great Enclosure, Johann Philipp Veith created a reproduction of Friedrich's work entitled Evening on the Elbe in 1832.

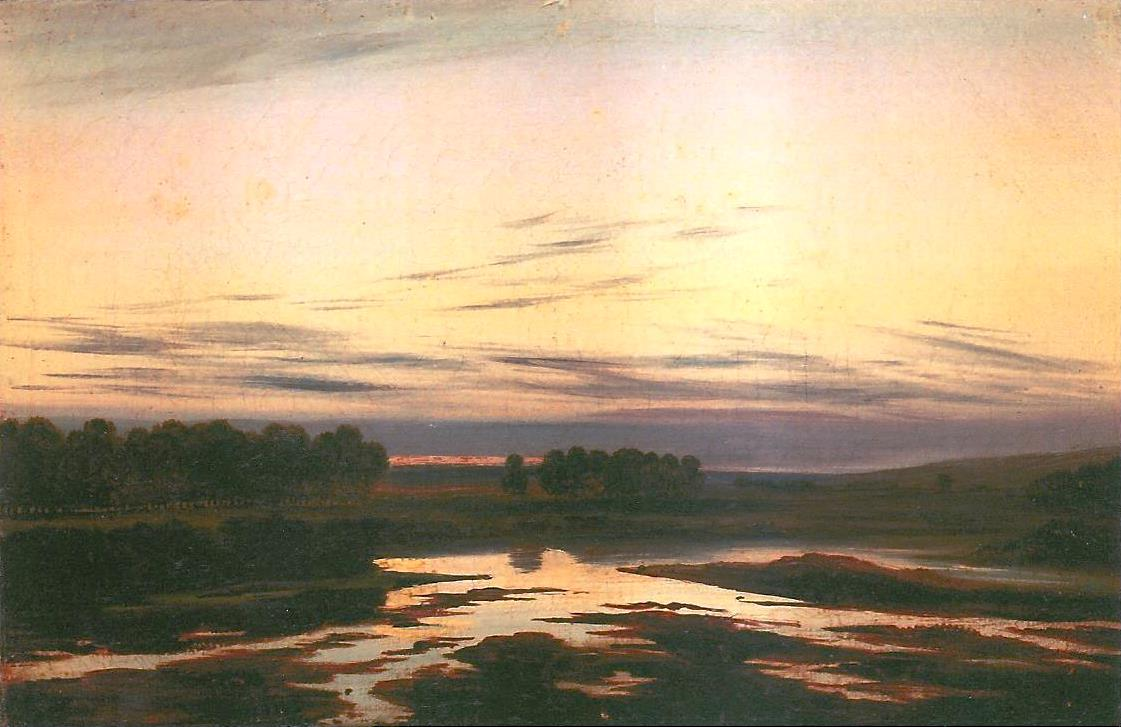
Caspar David Friedrich: Sketch of the Great Enclosure, around 1830

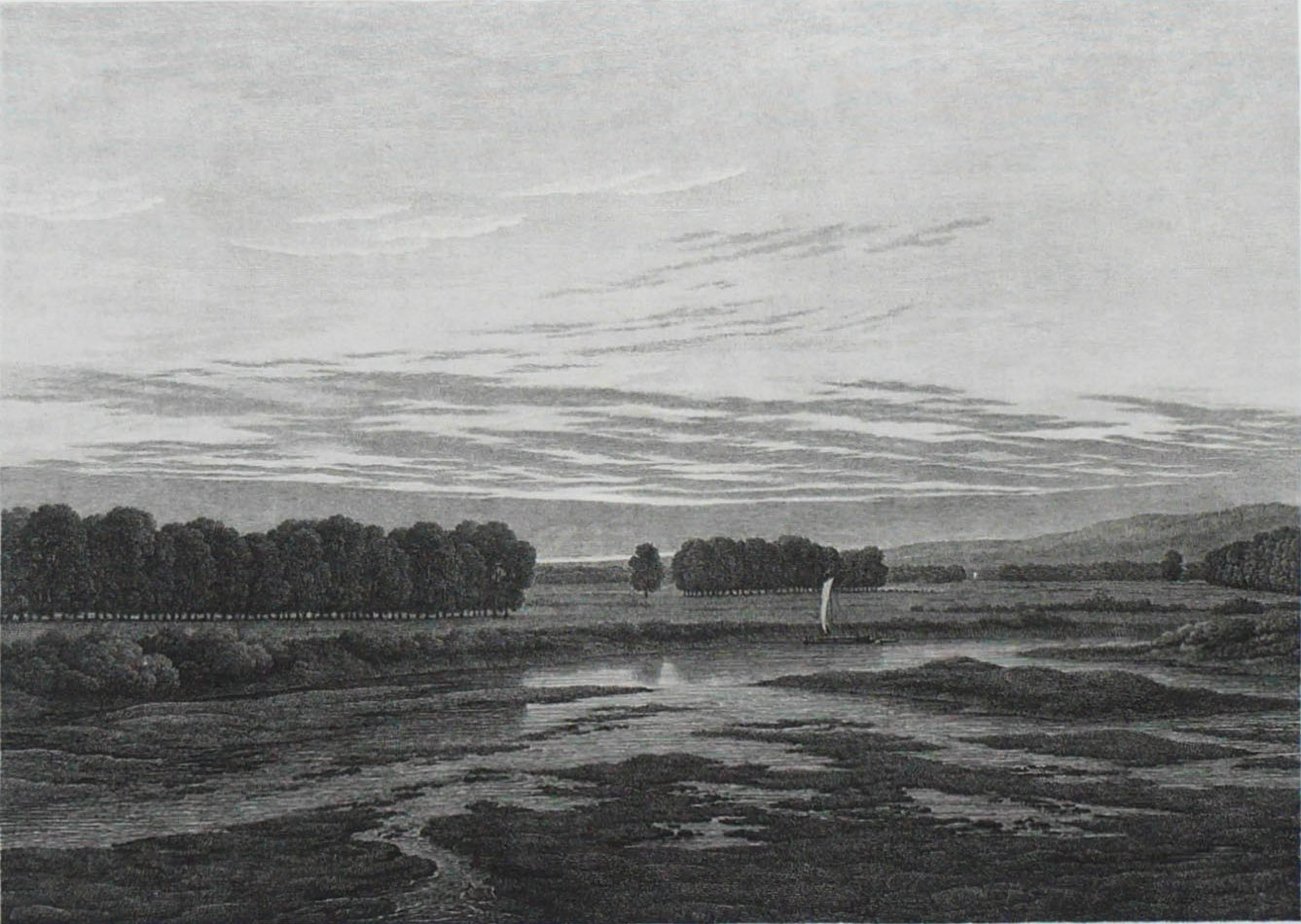
Johann Philipp Veith: Evening on the Elbe, 1832

== Ownership ==
In 1832 the work was acquired by the Sächsischen Kunstverein. Gottlob Adolf Ernst von Nostitz und Jänkendorf won the painting in one of the Kunstverein's raffles in December 1832. It was acquired by its present owner in 1909 from Ella von Nostitz und Jänckendorf.

== See also ==
- List of works by Caspar David Friedrich
