= The Port of Greifswald =

Painting by Caspar David Friedrich

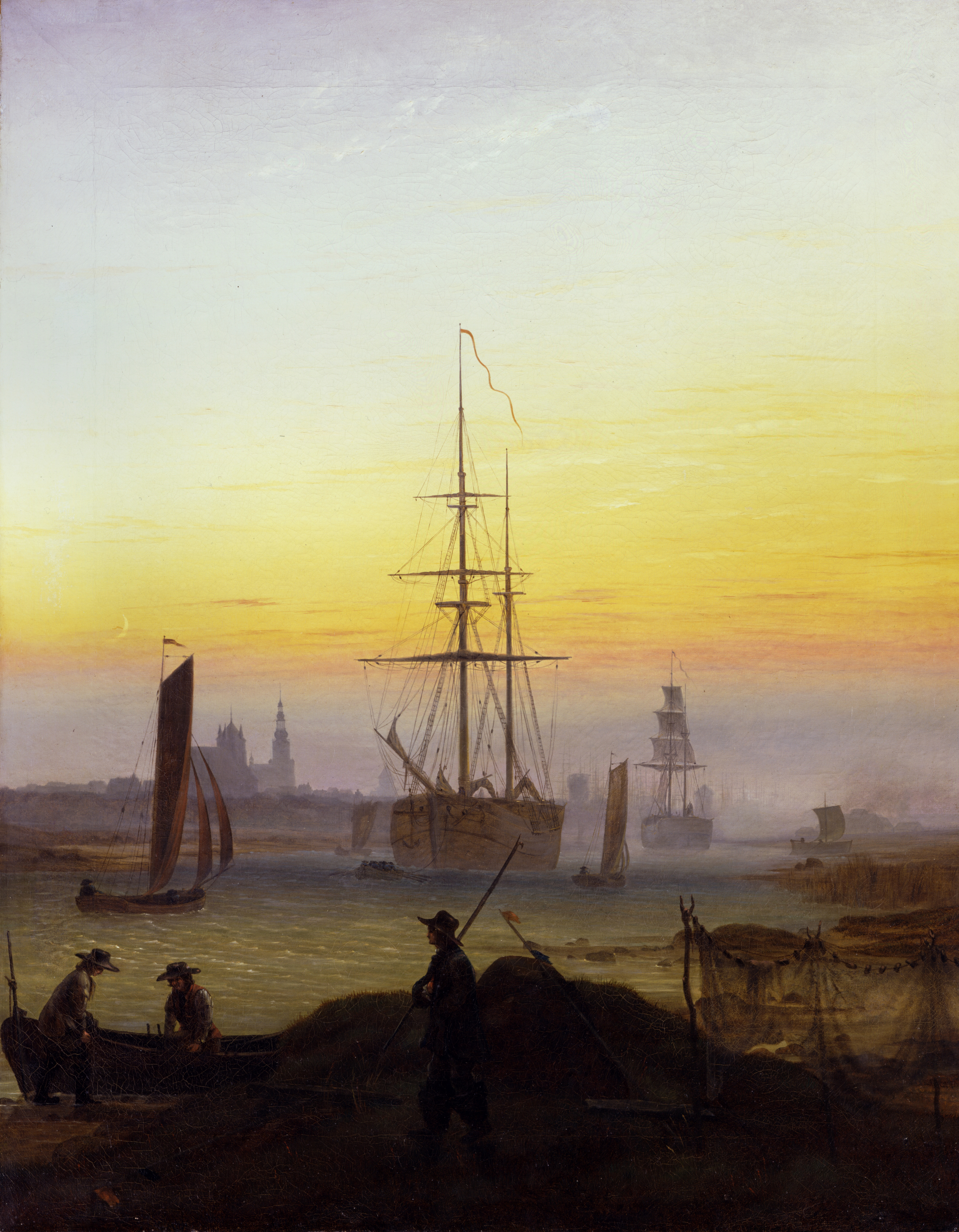
- Artist: Caspar David Friedrich
- Year: 1818–1820
- Medium: oil on canvas
- Dimensions: 90 cm × 70 cm (35 in × 28 in)
- Location: Alte Nationalgalerie, Berlin

The Port of Greifswald (German: Greifswalder Hafen) is an 1818–1820 painting by Caspar David Friedrich, depicting a scene in the Bay of Greifswald. It is currently housed in the Alte Nationalgalerie in Berlin, which acquired it in 1919.

== See also ==
- List of works by Caspar David Friedrich
