= List of works by Caspar David Friedrich =

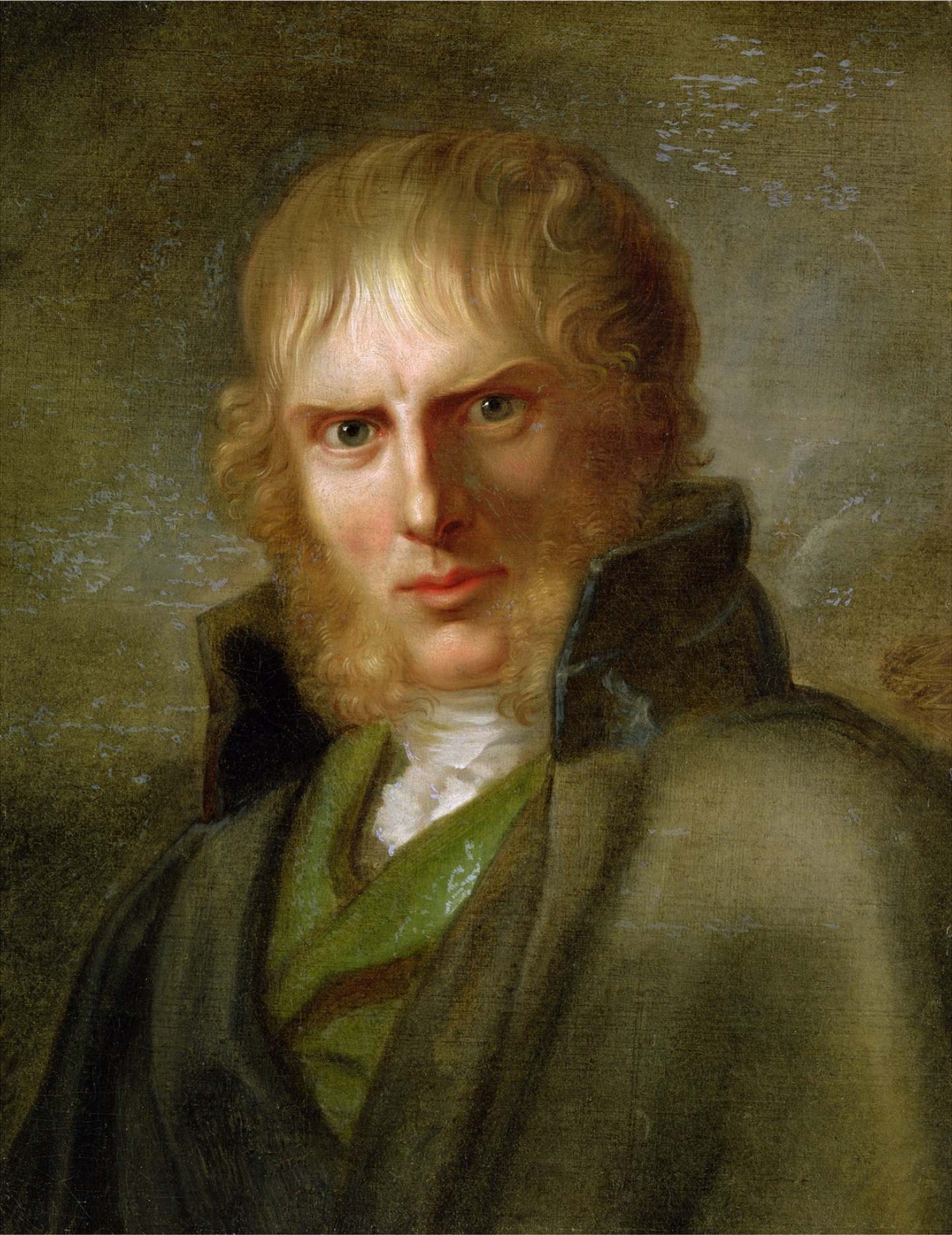
Gerhard von Kügelgen, Portrait of Caspar David Friedrich (c. 1810–1820)

This is an incomplete list of works by the German Romantic artist Caspar David Friedrich (1774–1840) by completion date where known. Friedrich was a prolific artist who produced over 500 attributed works; however, he is generally known for only a small number of works seen as emblems of Romanticism.

In line with Romantic ideals of the time, Friedrich intended that his paintings would function visually only. He was thus cautious that the titles given to his work were not overly descriptive or evocative. It is likely that some of today's relatively literal titles, such as The Stages of Life, were not given by the artist himself, but were adopted during one of the revivals of interest in his art during the late 19th and early 20th century.

Complications arise when dating Friedrich's work, mainly because he often did not directly name or date his canvases. However, he kept a carefully detailed notebook on his output, which scholars have used to tie paintings to their completion dates.

== Oil Paintings ==
Painting	Painting Name	Year	Method	Size	City	Gallery	Notes
	Landscape with Temple in Ruin (in French)	1797	Oil on canvas				
	Wreck in the Ice-sea (in French)	1798	Oil on canvas	31.4 x 23.6 cm	Houston	Museum of Fine Arts	
	West Facade of the Eldena Ruins	1806	Oil on canvas		Angers	Musée des Beaux-Arts	
	Seashore with Fisherman	c. 1807	Oil on canvas	33.5 x 51 cm	Vienna	Belvedere	
	The Summer (in French)	1807	Oil on canvas	71.4 x 103.6 cm	Munich	Neue Pinakothek	
	Dolmen in the Snow	1807	Oil on canvas	61.5 x 80 cm	Dresden	Galerie Neue Meister	
	Sea beach in the fog	1807	Oil on canvas	34.5 x 52 cm	Vienna	Belvedere	
	Cross in the Mountains	1808	Oil on canvas	115 x 110 cm	Dresden	Galerie Neue Meister	
	Portrait of an older man	1808 to 1810	Oil on canvas	51.7 x 42.4 cm	Hanover	Lower Saxony State Museum	
	Morning mist in the Mountains	1808	Oil on canvas	71 x 104 cm	Rudolstadt	Heidecksburg	
	The Feldstein near Rathen	1808	Oil on canvas		Nuremberg	Germanisches Nationalmuseum	
	Monk in the snow	1808	Oil on canvas		Mannheim	Kunsthalle Mannheim	
	The Monk by the Sea	1809	Oil on canvas	115 x 110 cm	Berlin	Alte Nationalgalerie	
	The Abbey in the Oakwood	1809 to 1810	Oil on canvas	110 x 171 cm	Berlin	Alte Nationalgalerie	
	Giant Mountains Landscape with Rising Fog	1809 to 1810	Oil on canvas	54.9 x 70.4 cm	Munich	Neue Pinakothek	
	Mountain Landscape with Rainbow	1810	Oil on canvas	70 x 102 cm	Essen	Museum Folkwang	
	Bohemian Landscape with Mount Milleschauer (in French)	1808	Oil on canvas	70 x 104 cm	Dresden	Galerie Neue Meister	
	Morning on the Riesengebirge	1810 to 1811	Oil on canvas	108 x 170 cm	Karlsruhe	Kunsthalle Karlsruhe	
	Landscape with Rainbow (Friedrich)	c. 1810	Oil on canvas	59 x 84.5 cm	Saint Petersburg	Hermitage Museum	
	Winter Landscape with church	1811	Oil on canvas	32 x 45 cm	London	National Gallery	
	Winter Landscape (in French)	1811	Oil on canvas	32.5 x 45 cm	Buenos Aires	National Museum of Fine Arts	
	Winter Landscape with Church	1811	Oil on canvas	33 x 45 cm	Dayton	Dayton Art Institute	
	Harbor by Moonlight	1811	Oil on canvas	24 x 36.5 cm	Milwaukee	Milwaukee Art Museum	
	Landscape with Oak Trees and a Hunter	1811	Oil on canvas	32 x 44.5 cm	Omaha	Joslyn Art Museum	
	Rocks in the Harz mountain (in French)	1811	Oil on canvas	32 x 45 cm	Dresden	Galerie Neue Meister	
	Cross and cathedral in the mountains (in French)	1812	Oil on canvas	45 x 37 cm	Düsseldorf	Museum Kunstpalast	
	The Tombs of the Old Heroes	1812	Oil on canvas	49.5 × 70.5 cm	Hamburg	Hamburger Kunsthalle	
	Cross in the Mountains (Friedrich)	1813	Oil on canvas	42 x 32 cm	Stuttgart	Staatsgalerie Stuttgart	Inv. Nr. L 569
	The Chasseur in the Woods	1814	Oil on canvas	66 x 47 cm		Private collection	
	Cross in the Mountains (in French)	1822	Oil on canvas	71.7 x 128 cm	Gotha	Friedenstein Palace	
	The Cross beside the Baltic	1815	Oil on canvas	45 x 33.5 cm	Potsdam	Sanssouci Palace	
	Sailing Ship (Friedrich)	1815	Oil on canvas	72.3 x 51 cm	Chemnitz	Art Collection Chemnitz (in German)	Inv. n. 215
	View of a Harbour (in Swedish)	1815 to 1816	Oil on canvas	90 x 71 cm	Berlin	Schloss Charlottenburg	
	Greifswald in Moonlight (in Swedish)	1816 to 1817	Oil on canvas	22.5 x 30.5 cm	Oslo	National Museum of Art, Architecture and Design	
	Two Men by the Sea	1817	Oil on canvas	51 x 66 cm	Berlin	Alte Nationalgalerie	
	Media related to Coastline in the evening light at Wikimedia Commons	1816 to 1818	Oil on canvas	22 x 31 cm	Lübeck	Behnhaus	
	City at Moonrise	c. 1817	Oil on canvas	45 x 33 cm	Hamburg	Hamburger Kunsthalle	
	Neubrandenburg in the Morning Mist	c. 1817	Oil on canvas	91 x 72 cm	Montreal	Montreal Museum of Fine Arts	
	Wanderer above the Sea of Fog	1817 to 1818	Oil on canvas	94.8 x 74.8 cm	Hamburg	Hamburger Kunsthalle	
	The Cathedral (Friedrich)	1818	Oil on canvas	70 x 152 cm	Schweinfurt	Museum Georg Schäfer	
	The Gazebo	1818	Oil on canvas	30.0 x 21.5 cm	Munich	Neue Pinakothek	Inv.-Nr. FV 10
	Chalk Cliffs on Rügen	c. 1818	Oil on canvas	90.5 x 71 cm	Winterthur	Kunstmuseum Winterthur	
	Woman on the Beach of Rügen	c. 1818	Oil on canvas		San Antonio	San Antonio Museum of Art	
	Woman before the Setting Sun (in German)	1818 to 1820	Oil on canvas	22 x 30 cm	Essen	Museum Folkwang	
	The Port of Greifswald	1818 to 1820	Oil on canvas	90 x 70 cm	Berlin	Alte Nationalgalerie	
	On the Sailing Boat	c. 1819	Oil on canvas	71 x 56 cm	Minneapolis	Minneapolis Institute of Art	
	Monastery Burial-Ground Under Snow	1819	Oil on canvas		Hamburg	Hamburger Kunsthalle	
	Dolmen in the Fall (in French)	c. 1820			Dresden	Galerie Neue Meister	
	Swans in the Reeds	1819 to 1820	Oil on canvas	38 x 44 cm	Frankfurt	Freies Deutsches Hochstift	
	Two Men Contemplating the Moon	1819 to 1820	Oil on canvas	35 x 44 cm	Dresden	Galerie Neue Meister	
	Port of Greifswald	c. 1810 to 1820	Oil on canvas	94 x 74 cm	Cologne	Wallraf-Richartz Museum	
	Oak in the Snow	1820	Oil on canvas	44 x 34.5 cm	Toronto	Art Gallery of Ontario	
	River Bank in Fog	1821	Oil on canvas	22 x 33.5 cm	Cologne	Wallraf-Richartz Museum	
	Night in a Harbour	c. 1820	Oil on canvas	74 x 52 cm	Pittsburgh	Carnegie Museum of Art	
	Drifting Clouds (Friedrich)	c. 1820	Oil on canvas	18.3 x 24.5 cm	Williamstown	Sterling and Francine Clark Art Institute	
	Evening	c. 1820 to 1821	Oil on canvas	22 x 30.5 cm	Hannover	Lower Saxony State Museum	
	The Morning (Friedrich)	c. 1820 to 1821	Oil on canvas	22 x 30.5 cm	Hannover	Lower Saxony State Museum	
	View of the Baltic	1820 to 1825	Oil on canvas	34.5 x 44 cm	Los Angeles	Getty Center	
	Fog in the Elbe Valley	1821	Oil on canvas	33 x 43 cm	Berlin	Alte Nationalgalerie	
	Moonrise by the Sea	c.1821	Oil on canvas	135 x 170 cm	Saint Petersburg	Hermitage Museum	
	Morning in the Mountains (in French)	1822 to 1823	Oil on canvas	135 x 170 cm	Winterthur	Kunstmuseum Winterthur	
	The Tree of Crows	c. 1822	Oil on canvas	59 x 73 cm	Paris	Musée du Louvre	
	The Lonely Tree	1822	Oil on canvas	55 x 71 cm	Phoenix	Phoenix Art Museum	
	Moonrise Over the Sea	1822	Oil on canvas	55 x 71 cm	Munich	Neue Pinakothek	
	Meadows near Greifswald	c. 1822	Oil on canvas	34.5 x 48.3 cm	Pasadena	Norton Simon Museum	
	Woman at a Window	1822	Oil on canvas	44 x 37 cm	Moscow	Pushkin Museum	
	Rocky ravine in the Elbe Sandstone Mountains	1822 to 1823	Oil on canvas	94 x 74 cm	Vienna	Belvedere	
	Forest Interior by Moonlight	1823 to 1830	Oil on canvas	70.5 x 49 cm	Berlin	National Gallery (Berlin)	
	Ruins of Eldena, near Greifswald	1825	Oil on canvas	35 x 49 cm	Dallas	Dallas Museum of Art	Inv. Nr. A II 574
	The Sea of Ice	1824	Oil on canvas	96.7 x 126.9 cm	Hamburg	Hamburger Kunsthalle	
	Hill and Ploughed Field near Dresden	1824	Oil on canvas	22.2 x 30.5 cm	Hamburg	Hamburger Kunsthalle	
	Man and Woman Contemplating the Moon	c. 1824	Oil on canvas	34 x 44 cm	Berlin	Alte Nationalgalerie	
	Evening with Clouds	Oct 1824	Oil on canvas	20 x 27.5 cm	Richmond	Virginia Museum of Fine Arts	
	Reefs by the Seashore	c. 1824	Oil on canvas	22 x 31 cm	Hartford	Wadsworth Atheneum	
	Trees and Bushes in the Snow (in French)	c. 1825	Oil on canvas	31 x 25.5 cm	Dresden	Galerie Neue Meister	
	The Cemetery Entrance (in French)	1825	Oil on canvas	143 x 110 cm	São Paulo	São Paulo Museum of Art	
	Two Men Contemplating the Moon	1825 to 1830	Oil on canvas	35 x 44 cm	New York	Metropolitan Museum of Art	
	The Cemetery Gate	1825 to 1830	Oil on canvas	31 x 25 cm	Denver	Denver Art Museum	
	Seashore by Moonlight	1825 to 1830	Oil on canvas	77 x 97 cm	Berlin	Alte Nationalgalerie	
	The Watzmann	1824 to 1825	Oil on canvas	135 x 170 cm	Basel	Kunstmuseum Basel	
	Graveyard under Snow	1826	Oil on canvas	31 x 25 cm	Ottawa	National Gallery of Canada	
	Cabin in the Snow (in German)	1827	Oil on canvas	31 x 25 cm	Berlin	Alte Nationalgalerie	
	The Oaktree in the Snow	1829	Oil on canvas	71 x 48 cm	Oxford	Ashmolean Museum	
	Ships in Harbour, Evening	c. 1828	Oil on canvas	76.5 x 88.2 cm	Kansas City	Nelson-Atkins Museum of Art	
	The Evergreens by the Waterfall	1828	Oil on canvas	44.2 x 34.8 cm	Hamburg	Hamburger Kunsthalle	
	The Temple of Juno in Agrigento	c. 1828 to 1830	Oil on canvas	53.3 x 71.5 cm	Dortmund	Museum am Ostwall	Inv. Nr. C 5022
	Easter Morning	c. 1828 to 1835	Oil on canvas	43.7 x 34.4 cm	Madrid	Thyssen-Bornemisza Museum	Inv. Nr. 792 (1973.24)
	Evening Landscape with Two Men	1830 to 1835	Oil on canvas	25 x 31 cm	Dortmund	Museum am Ostwall	
	Memories of the Giant Mountains	1830 to 1835	Oil on canvas	72 x 102 cm	Tokyo	National Museum of Western Art	
	The Great Enclosure	c. 1832	Oil on canvas	73.5 x 102.5 cm	Dresden	Galerie Neue Meister	
	Neubrandenburg Burning	c. 1835	Oil on canvas	72 x 101 cm	Griefswald	Pomeranian State Museum	
	Wreck in the Moonlight	c. 1835	Oil on canvas	31.3 x 42.5 cm	Indianapolis	Indianapolis Museum of Art	
	The Stages of Life	1835	Oil on canvas	72.5 x 94 cm	Leipzig	Museum der bildenden Künste	
	Landscape with the Rosenberg in the Bohemian Mountains	c. 1835	Oil on canvas	34.9 x 48.5 cm	Frankfurt	Städel	Inv. Nr. 1821
	Sea Shore in Moonlight	1835			Hamburg	Hamburger Kunsthalle	
	Forest in late autumn	1835	Oil on canvas	35 x 44 cm	Erfurt	Angermuseum	Inv. Nr. 3626
	Giant Mountains (Friedrich)	c. 1830 to 1835	Oil on canvas	72 x 102 cm	San Diego	San Diego Museum of Art	
	The Dreamer (in French)	1820 to 1840	Oil on canvas	27 x 21 cm	Saint Petersburg	Hermitage Museum	

== Drawings, watercolours, and prints ==
Artwork	Name	German name	Year	Technique	Dimensions	City	Gallery	Notes
		Schriftblatt: Gott hat selbst in unsere Schmerzen	December 1, 1788	Pen, ink and watercolour	207 x 329 mm	Greifswald	Museum der Stadt Greifswald	
	Female Nude in the Style of Johann Daniel Preißler	Weiblicher Akt nach Preißler	1790-1794	Pencil	321 x 201 mm	Greifswald	Museum der Stadt Greifswald	
	Luisa Spring in Frederiksdahl	Die Luisen-Quelle in Frederiksdahl	1797	Pen, ink and watercolour	289 x 244 mm	Hamburg	Hamburger Kunsthalle Kupferstichkabinett	
	Country house in a broadleaf forest	Landhaus im Laubwald	c. 1797	Pen, ink and watercolour			Private Collection	
	Frederiksberg Spring in Copenhagen	Die Frederiksberger Quelle bei Kopenhagen I	July 9, 1797	Brown ink and watercolour	217 x 168 mm	Dresden	Kupferstich-Kabinett	
	Landscape with Pavilion	Landschaft mit Pavillon	c. 1797	Pen, ink and watercolour	167 x 217 mm	Amsterdam	Rijksmuseum	
	Landscape in the Giant Mountains	Landschaft im Riesengebirge	1798	Watercolor over pencil		Kiev	Khanenko Museum	
	Fishing Boat	Fischerboot	1798	Pencil	103 x 168 mm	Greifswald	Museum der Stadt Greifswald	
	Tree, Ship, and Nets	Baum, Boot, Netze	c. 1798	Pencil	150 x 165 mm	Greifswald	Museum der Stadt Greifswald	
		Studie eines sitzendes Jünglings	May 7, 1798	Pen, ink and watercolour	289 x 244 mm	Prague	National Gallery in Prague	
	Portrait of the Pastor and Poet Ernst Theodor Johann Brûckner	Bildnis des Pastors und Dichters Ernst Theodor Johann Brûckner	c. 1798	Black chalk	251 x 199 mm	Berlin	Staatliche Museen, Berlin	
	Self-Portrait	Selbstportrait	1800	Black chalk	420 x 276 mm	Copenhagen	Statens Museum for Kunst	
	Mother Heiden	Mutter Heiden	1798–1802	Black chalk	420 x 276 mm	Greifswald	Pommersches Landesmuseum	
	Portrait of Adolph Gottlieb Friedrich	Bildnis des Vaters Adolph Gottlieb Friedrich	c. 1798-1802	Black chalk	250 x 205 mm	Greifswald	Museum der Stadt Greifswald	
	Scene from Schiller's "The Robbers"	Szene aus Schillers "Die Räuber"	1800–01	Pen and sepia	203 x 263 mm	Greifswald	Pommersches Landesmuseum	
	Rock Pinnacle in Uttewalder Grund	Felsentor im Uttewalder Grund	1801	70,5 × 50,3 cm	Sepia	Essen	Museum Folkwang	
	Self-Portrait with Cap and Sighting Eye-Shield	Selbstportrait mit Mütze und Augenklappe	1802	Pencil, brush and ink	175 x 105 mm	Hamburg	Kunsthalle Hamburg	
	Hiker at the Milestone	Wanderer am Grenzstein	1802	Sepia				
	Adolf Gottlieb Friedrich, Reading	Adolf Gottlieb Friedrich, lesend	1802	Black chalk	346 x 320 mm	Mannheim	Kunsthalle Mannheim	
	View of Arkona with moon rising		1803	Pencil and brush (sepia ink)		Vienna	Albertina	
	The Woman with the spider's web between bare trunks	Die Frau mit dem Spinnennetz zwischen unbelaubten Baumstümpfen	1803	Woodcut; block cut by Friedrich's brother Christian	171 x 119 mm	Various (block in Hamburg Kunsthalle)		
	Woman with a Raven at an Abyss	Die Frau mit dem Raben am Abgrund	1803-04	Woodcut; block cut by Friedrich's brother Christian	171 x 119 mm	Various museums, including Metropolitan Museum of Art, New York		
	Boy sleeping on a grave	Knabe auf einem Grab schlafend	1803-04	Woodcut; block cut by Friedrich's brother Christian	78 x 124 mm	Various museums, including Metropolitan Museum of Art, New York		
	Pilgrimage at Sunset (Sunrise)	Pilgerreise im Sonnenuntergang (Sonnenaufgang)	1805	Sepia	405 x 620 mm	Weimar	Staatliche Kunstsammlungen	
	View from the Painter's Studio	Blick aus dem Maleratelier	1805-06	Sepia		Bremen	Kunsthalle Bremen	
	Ruins of Eldena	Klosterruine Eldena	1806	Watercolor and ink		Schweinfurt	Museum Georg Schäfer	
	Cross in the Mountains	Kreuz in den Bergen	1805-06	Pencil and sepia	640 x 931 mm	New Haven, Connecticut	Yale University Art Gallery	
	Giant Grave by the Sea	Riesengruft am Meer	1806-07	Pen, brush and sepia over graphite	645 x 950 mm	Hyderabad	Salar Jung Museum	
	Self-Portrait	Selbstprotrait	1810	Black chalk	228 x 182 mm	Paris	Musée du Louvre	
	Window Looking over the Park	Fenster mit Blick über den Park	c.1810-11	Sepia and pencil	39.8x30.5 cm	St. Petersburg	The Hermitage	
	The Marketplace in Greifswald	Der Marktplatz in Greifswald	1818	Pencil, ink and watercolour				
	View of Greifswald from the East	Blick auf Greifswald vom Osten	1818	Watercolour				
	The Ruins of Eldena	Die Ruinen von Eldena	c. 1825	Pencil, ink and watercolour	178 x 229 mm		Private collection	
	Chalk Cliffs on Rügen (Watercolour)	Kreidefelsen auf Rügen (Wasserfarben)	1824-1826	Watercolour	25 x 32 cm			
	The Rock Gates in Neurathen	Die Felsentore in Neurathen	c.1826-1828	Watercolor over pencil	27.9x24.5 cm.	St. Petersburg	The Hermitage	
	Ruins of Teplitz Castle	Ruinen der Teplitz-Burg	1828	Pencil, ink and watercolour				
	Cave in the Harz Mountains	Höhle im Harzgebirge	1830s	sepia drawing on paper	22.3 x 30.5 cm	Copenhagen	HM The Queen's Reference Library, The Royal Danish Collection	
	Mountainous River Landscape (Night Version)	Von Bergen umgebene Flusslandschaft (Nachtversion)	1830-1835	Mixed media on transparent paper	77 x 127 cm	London	British Museum	
	Mountainous River Landscape (Day Version)	Von Bergen umgebene Flusslandschaft (Tagesversion)	1830-1835	Mixed media on transparent paper	77 x 127 cm	London	British Museum	
	Two Young Men on the Sea Shore by the Rising Moon	Zwei junge Männer am Strand bei aufgehendem Mond	1835	Sepia				
	Vulture on a Spade	Geier auf Spaten	1835	Sepia				Used as a concept cover art of the 2024 album Vultures, by Kanye West and Ty Dolla Sign
	Moonrise	Mondaufgang	c.1835-1837	Sepia and pencil	24.5x34.5 cm	St. Petersburg	The Hermitage	
	Owl in a Gothic Window	Eule im Gotischen Fenster	c.1836	Sepia and pencil	37.8x25.6 cm	St. Petersburg	The Hermitage	
	Landscape with Grave, Coffin and Owl	Landschaft mit Grab, Sarg und Eule	1836-37	Sepia over pencil	385 x 383 mm	Leipzig	Museum der bildenden Künste	
	Owl upon the Grave Marker	Eule auf Grabkreuz	1836-37	Sepia over pencil		Moscow	Pushkin Museum	
	Owl Flying against a Moonlit Sky	Eule, die gen mondbeschienenen Himmel fliegt	1836-37	Sepia over pencil	27.9x24.4 cm	St. Petersburg	The Hermitage	
	Boat on the Shore, Moonrise	Boot am Ufer, Mondaufgang	1837-1839	Sepia over pencil	24.4x41.6 cm	St. Petersburg	The Hermitage	

== Paintings after Friedrich ==
Artwork	Name	Artist	Year	Technique	Dimensions	City	Gallery	Notes
	Portrait of Caspar David Friedrich	Anonymous	1810s	Oil on canvas	67x52.4 cm	Mannheim	Kunsthalle Mannheim	
	Sunrise over the Sea	Anonymous	19th century	Oil on canvas	81x99 cm	Raleigh	North Carolina Museum of Art	inspired by Caspar David Friedrich's "Moonrise over the Sea"
	Village Landscape in the Morning Light	Anonymous	19th century	Oil on canvas	60x71 cm	Odesa	Odesa Museum of Western and Eastern Art	copy from Caspar David Friedrich
	Wreck in the Sea of Ice	Anonymous	1798	Oil on canvas	30x22 cm	Dallas	Dallas Museum of Art	copy from Caspar David Friedrich

== Sources ==
- Siegel, Linda. Caspar David Friedrich and the Age of German Romanticism. Branden Publishing Co, 1978. ISBN 0-8283-1659-7.
- Vaughan, William. Friedrich. London: Phaidon Press, 2004. ISBN 0-7148-4060-2.
- Wolf, Norbert. Friedrich. Cologne: Taschen, 2003. ISBN 3-8228-2293-0.
