= The Gazebo (painting) =

Painting by Caspar David Friedrich

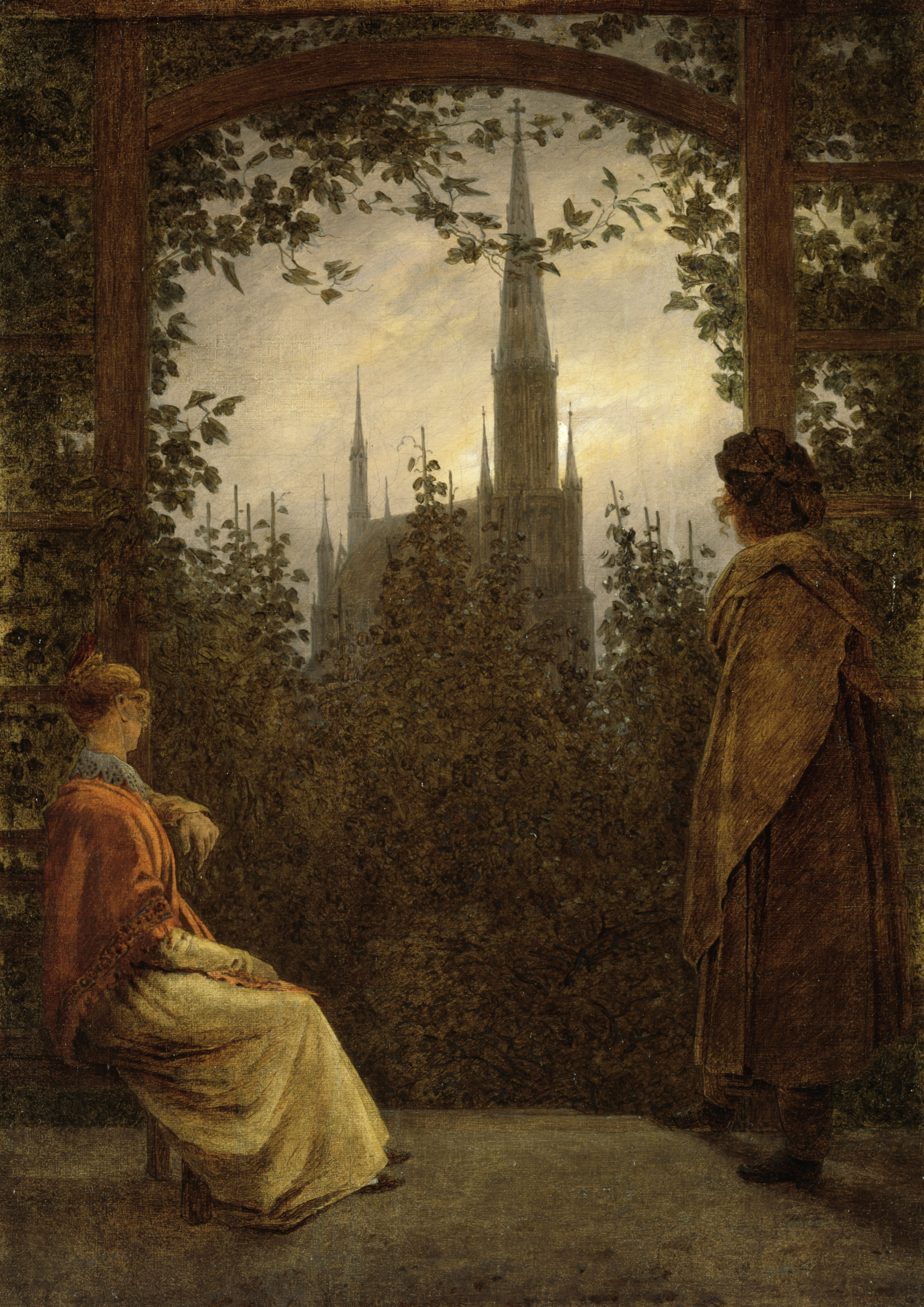
- The Gazebo
- Artist: Caspar David Friedrich
- Year: 1818
- Medium: Oil on canvas
- Dimensions: 94.8 cm × 74.8 cm (37.3 in × 29.4 in)
- Location: Neue Pinakothek, Munich

The Gazebo or The Garden Bower is an 1818 oil on canvas painting by Caspar David Friedrich, now in the Neue Pinakothek, in Munich.

The artist is said to have given it to Johann Christian Finelius from Greifswald and until 1848 it was owned by Finelius's son Hermann Finelius, again in Greifswald. Hermann left it to his sister Friederike Buhtz, who in turn left it to Paul Hanow (1909–1936). It was lost in 1944 due to wartime conditions.

== See also ==
- List of works by Caspar David Friedrich
