= The Gazebo (play) =

- Original language: English
- Written by: Alec Coppel
- Genre: comedy-mystery
- Setting: The living room of the Elliott Nash home near Roslyn, Long Island, New York. The present time

Premiere
- Date: 12 December 1958 (Broadway); 29 March 1960 (West End)

The Gazebo is a play by Alec Coppel based on a story by Coppel and his wife Myra.

== Broadway ==
It opened at Broadway's Lyceum Theatre on 12 December 1958 and ran for 266 performances, closing on 27 June 1959. Walter Slezak and Jayne Meadows played Elliott and Nell, and the director was Jerome Chodorov.

Brooks Atkinson in the New York Times claimed it was "as real as a TV crime play and a thousand times more diverting," though fellow critic Robert Coleman maintained that "There were times when a good gust of wind might have blown The Gazebo right off the Lyceum's stage." The subsequent US tour starred Tom Ewell and Jan Sterling.

The production only recouped 50% of its investment but Coppel earned a reported $54,000 in royalties from the Broadway run plus $60,000 from the sale of the movie rights.

== Other productions ==
In London, Ian Carmichael and Moira Lister were the stars of the West End production, directed by Anthony Sharp. This opened at the Savoy Theatre on 29 March 1960 and ran for 479 performances. "The Gazebo is one of those modern murder plays which depend on comedy rather than mystery," noted Theatre World editor Frances Stephens, "and no actor is better equipped than Ian Carmichael, with his wholesome fooling and overall 'niceness', to take any embarrassment out of a laughter-making murder theme, even with the corpse in full view."

The 1959 film of the same name is an adaptation of the play. It starred Glenn Ford and Debbie Reynolds.

The French film Jo, released in 1971 and starring Louis de Funès and Claude Gensac, was also based on the play. Another French version, this time for TV - Une femme dans les bras, un cadavre sur le dos, with Jean Lefebvre and Blanche Ravalec - appeared in 1995.

A one-hour radio adaptation by Patricia Mays was first broadcast by BBC World Service on 6 August 1978, starring Phil Brown, Pat Starr, and Ed Bishop.
