= Young Woman at a Window =

1925 painting by Salvador Dalí

- Artist: Salvador Dalí
- Year: 1925
- Medium: oil on paper
- Dimensions: 105 cm × 74.5 cm (41 in × 29.3 in)
- Location: Museo Nacional Centro de Arte Reina Sofía, Madrid

Young Woman at a Window is a 1925 oil on paper realist work by Salvador Dalí, produced in his youth. It shows the painter's sister Ana Maria, seen from behind in front of a window at Cadaqués. It is now in the Museo Reina Sofía, in Madrid.

It seems to be inspired by Caspar David Friedrich's Woman at a Window. It is an example of Rückenfigur.

== See also ==
- List of works by Salvador Dalí
