= Old German (disambiguation) =

Old German usually refers to Old High German, but it could also refer to:

- Altdeutsche Tracht (old German dress), a dress style popular among early 19th-century German radicals
- brands of beer produced by brewing companies, including Iron City Brewing Company and (formerly) Yuengling
- Old Low German (Old Saxon), a Germanic language and the earliest recorded form of Low German
