= Two Men Contemplating the Moon =

Series of paintings by Caspar David Friedrich

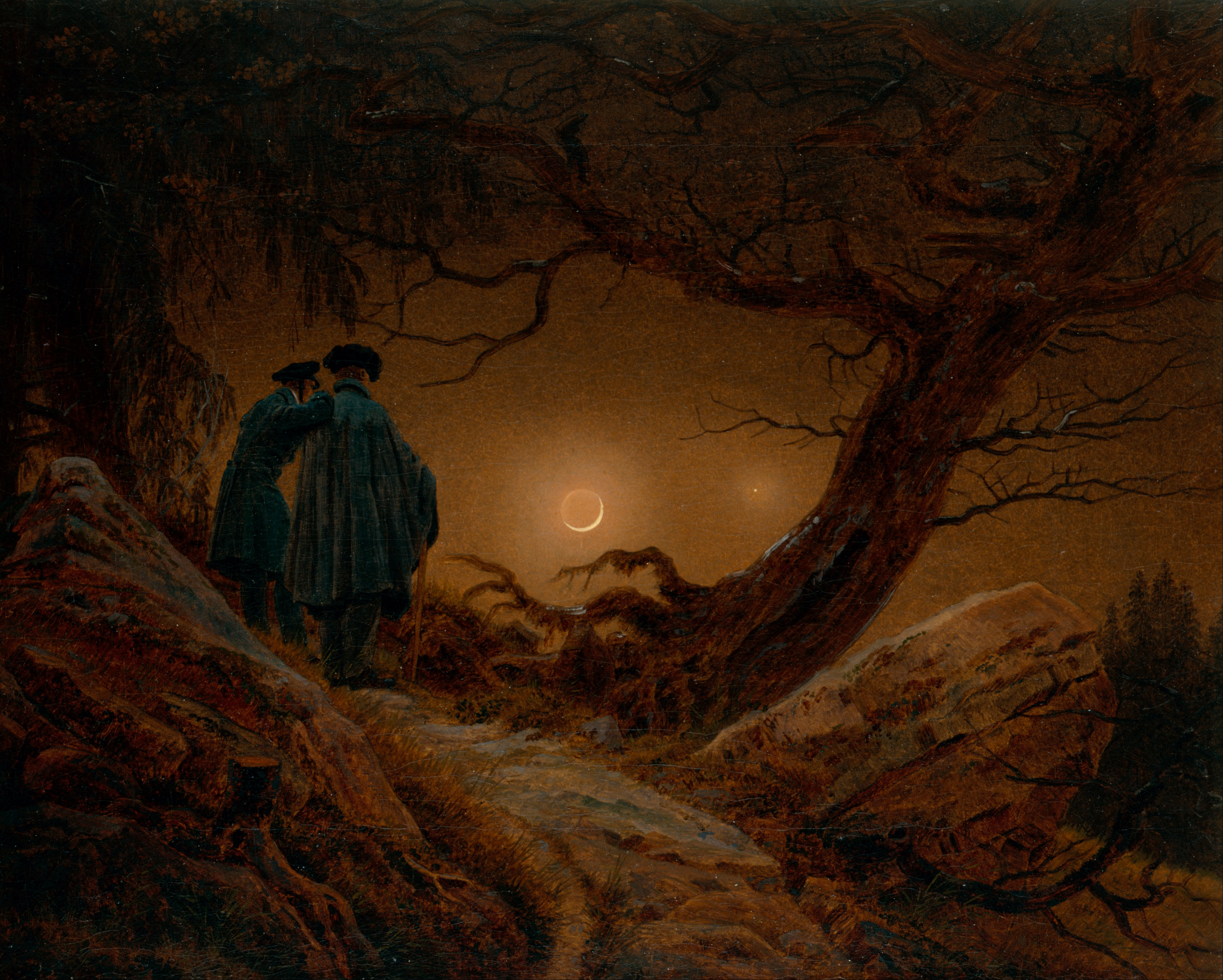
- Artist: Caspar David Friedrich
- Year: 1819–1820
- Medium: oil on canvas
- Dimensions: 35 cm × 44.5 cm (14 in × 17.5 in)
- Location: Galerie Neue Meister, Dresden

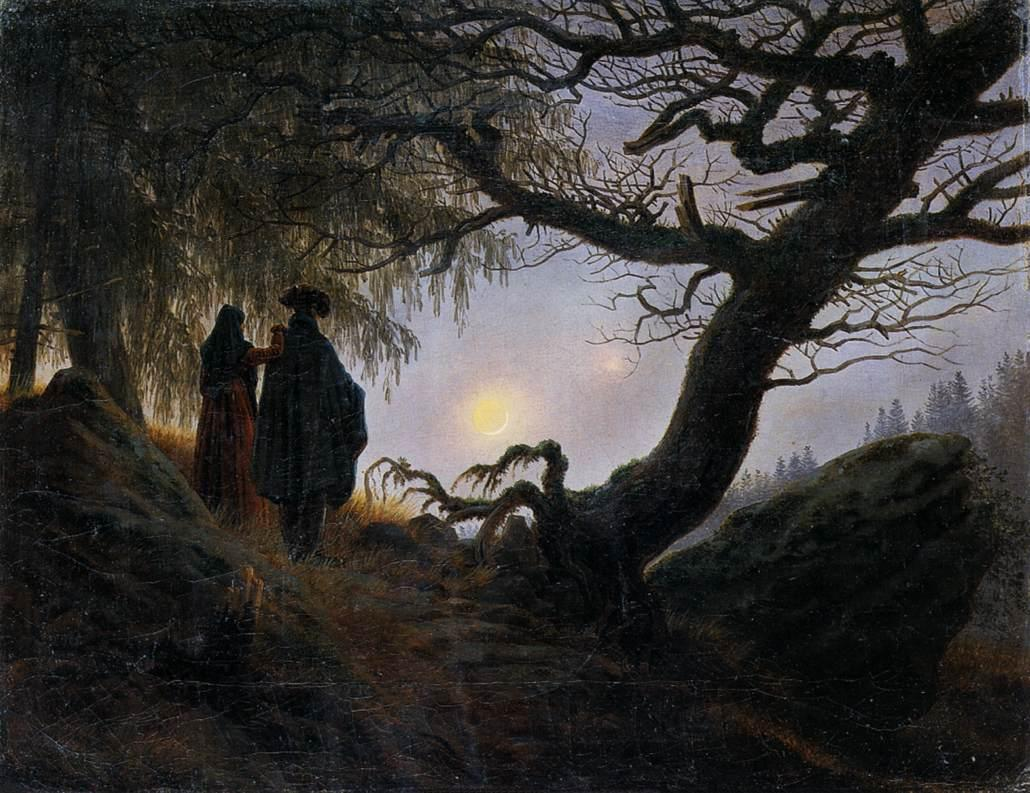
Man and Woman Contemplating the Moon, Alte Nationalgalerie, c. 1824. 34 x 44 cm

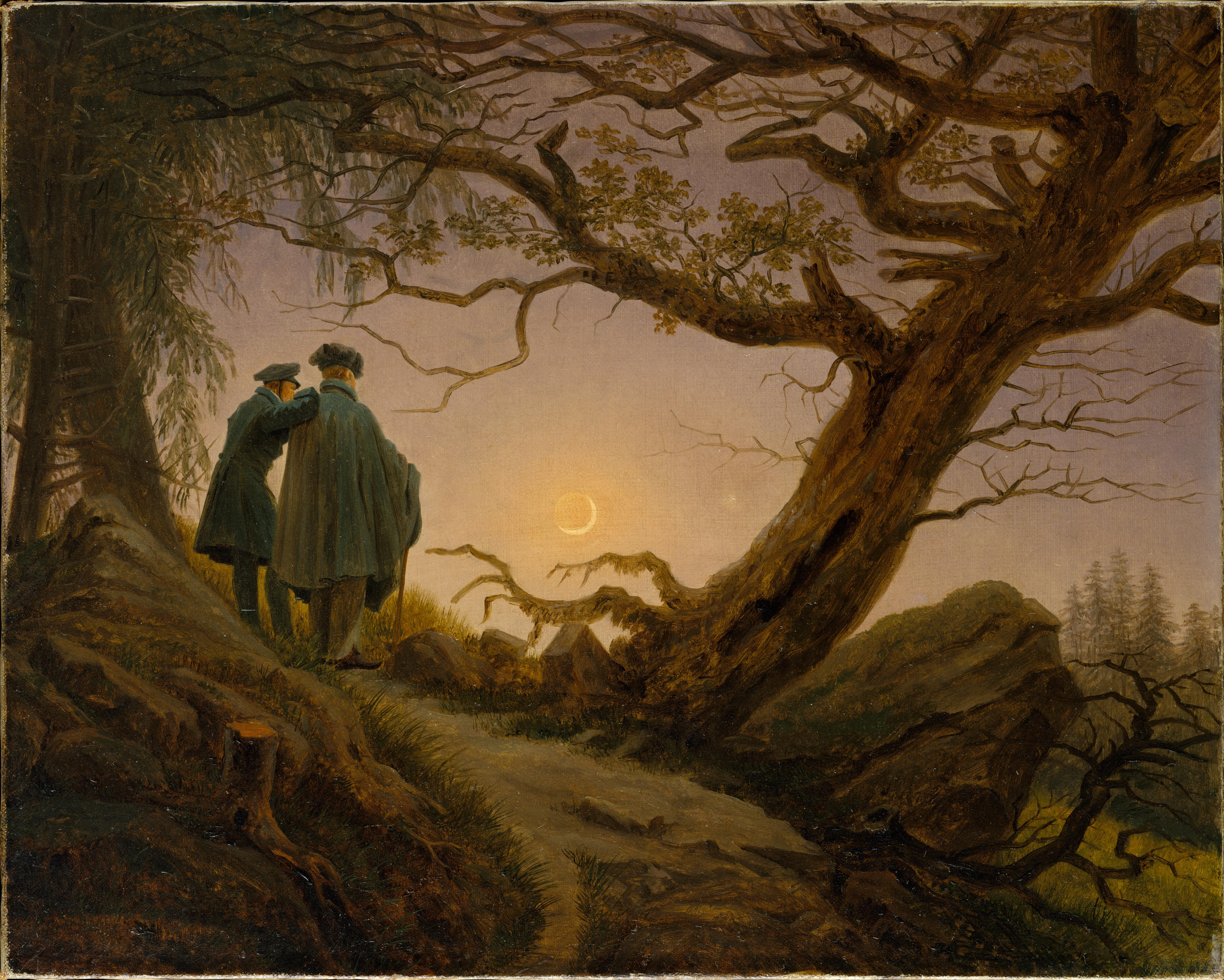
Two Men Contemplating the Moon, Metropolitan Museum of Art, c. 1825–1830. 34.9 x 43.8 cm

Two Men Contemplating the Moon (German: Zwei Männer in Betrachtung des Mondes) and Man and Woman Contemplating the Moon are a series of similar paintings by Caspar David Friedrich, the setting being among his best-known works. Friedrich painted at least three versions, with one variation featuring a man and a woman. The 1819–20 version in the Galerie Neue Meister is considered the original; the c. 1824 variant with a woman is in the Alte Nationalgalerie; and the c. 1830 version is in the Metropolitan Museum of Art.

These German Romantic landscape paintings feature two figures in a dark forest silhouetted by a pastel sky. The works' dark foregrounds and lighter backgrounds create a sharp contrast. The sky suggests that there is a solar eclipse occurring. A dead, uprooted tree's dark roots and branches contrast with the sky. The jagged branches and stark contrasts seem to create a threatening environment for the figures, and are reminiscent of the imposing Gothic style seen initially in the medieval era, but revived in the Romantic era. The same can be said of the dark, shadowy trees and rocks surrounding the couple. The figures are dressed in dark colors and stiff, somewhat formal garments, which signify their higher class. The works emphasize spirituality in nature and the presence of the sublime, which are major themes of Friedrich.

Standing before Man and Woman Contemplating the Moon, Playwright Samuel Beckett said, "This was the source of Waiting for Godot, you know."

== Image description and composition ==
The paintings depict a foreground scene of two people on a mountain path leading up from the centre bottom of the picture to the left. The man on the right is wearing a grey-green cape and the black beret of the altdeutsche Tracht and has a stick in his right hand. The man on the left is somewhat higher on the path and is leaning on his companion's shoulder; he is slimmer and is wearing a grey-green frock-coat, from which a white collar protrudes, and the black cap of an early Burschenschaft, its ribbon tied under his chin. They are both looking at the sickle of the waxing moon and the evening star. The Moon's night side is lit by earthshine. The scene is framed by an uprooted and moss-grown oak on their right, whose branches reach out to those of a spruce on their left; a boulder prevents the oak from falling, and there is another boulder on the left. In the background, the landscape falls away; the tops of pine trees suggest a forest. In the immediate foreground are a tree stump and a large dry branch lying on the ground. The painting is almost monochromatic in shades of brown and grey, depicting nightfall.

The Dresden version is generally held to be the original. It exemplifies the golden section in the ratios between the central vertical axis, the perpendicular axis between it and the star, and the other axis running through the older man's eye. In line with older readings of the artist that insist on spiritual messages behind natural forms, the German art historian Werner Busch sees the geometric layout as signalling the transcendent message of the two figures' experience of nature. As in many paintings by Friedrich, there is no middle ground; the foreground earthly scene is contrasted with the lighted sky and the abyss at the two men's feet is made perceptible through this contrast, which exemplifies the antithetical relationship of rational, palpable earthly space and irrational and sublime infinity explored by the Romantic painters. The composition places these in a harmonious relationship. It has been described as a defining image of German Romanticism.

The two men depicted may be Friedrich himself, on the right, and his pupil August Heinrich (1794–1822) on the left; Friedrich's friend Wilhelm Wegener gave this interpretation. Dahl agreed that the younger man was Heinrich but identified the older as Christian Wilhelm Bommer, the brother of Friedrich's wife Caroline; however, in 1819, Heinrich was 25 but Bommer was only 18. Caroline Friedrich would be the woman in the variant with a man and a woman. Two art historians of the early twentieth century also proposed locations. Max Semrau located Friedrich and his friend Benjamin Friedrich Gotthelf Kummer on a cliff on the island of Rügen; Max Sauerlandt, the same two men in the Harz Mountains.

=== Man and Woman Contemplating the Moon ===
In this painting, the man and woman face away from the viewer, centered vertically, and located left of center horizontally. The woman's arm is resting on the man's shoulder. The serene and contemplative pose of the couple contrasts with the contortions of the half-uprooted oak tree, which opposes the verticality of the lush pine tree on the left. This irregular and asymmetrical pictorial construction—one linked with the post-Baroque aesthetic of the previous century—was fairly rare in Friedrich's work, often characterized by regular geometric arrangements.

== Versions ==
According to Johan Christian Dahl, the first owner of the (presumed) earliest version, Friedrich painted an unknown number of copies, and others also copied the picture. Several versions are extant today, but their dating and authorship have not been positively determined; discussion of the question was revived in 1991. Apart from Dahl's copy (now in Dresden), there is a version in the Metropolitan Museum of Art, New York, dated 1825–1830. In addition to the closer adherence to the golden section, the Dresden version is truer to Friedrich's preparatory sketches from nature.

Paintings of the variant image of a man and woman observing the Moon (Mann und Frau den Mond betrachtend), dated between 1818 and 1835, are located in the Alte Nationalgalerie in Berlin and a private collection in Switzerland. The art historian Kaspar Monrad suggests that this may be the first version of the theme, and thus would predate early 1818, when the Danish writer Peder Hjort reported obtaining such a painting from Friedrich. In addition to substituting the figure of a woman for the man on the left, the Berlin version differs from Two Men Contemplating the Moon in many details: the stump is broken rather than sawed, as it is in the Dresden version, the dead branch has been omitted, the tops of the trees on the right are higher, and decisively, the walking stick has been omitted, although X-ray examination reveals two lines indicating where the artist had planned to include it.

== Provenance ==
The painting in the Galerie Neue Meister in Dresden was included in 1830 in Johan Christian Dahl's collection under the title Mondscheinlandschaft. Zwei männliche Figuren betrachten den aufgehenden Halbmond (Moonlit Landscape: Two Male Figures Observing the Rising Half-Moon); he sold it to the Royal Art Gallery in Dresden in 1840 for 80 talers. Dahl had obtained the painting from Friedrich in exchange for his own work. The painting of a man and a woman in Berlin was at the Salomon art dealership in Dresden in 1922. In 1932, it was shown at the Paul Cassirer gallery in Berlin on loan from the collection of Lulu Böhler in Lucerne, and the Alte Nationalgalerie bought it that year from the Fritz Nathan Gallery of Lucerne.

== Interpretations ==
With its softly melancholy mood, the painting epitomises the Romantic view of nature. The two meditative figures, seen almost entirely from the rear, represent the observer, who is left to contemplate what they are seeing and supply a meaning. In addition to the Romantic mysticism of the tension between the palpable world and the unending cosmos, three additional contrasting interpretations have been presented, in terms of religion, politics and biography.

=== Religion ===
The German art historian Helmut Börsch-Supan interprets the evergreen spruce and the dead oak as symbols of the Christian worldview and defeated paganism, respectively, the path as the path of life and the waxing moon as Christ. The oak has traditionally represented history and transience, the evergreen fir-tree, the constantly renewing power of nature. The uprooted tree may represent death, yet its contrast with the clear, bright sky represents hope, eternal life, and closeness to the sublime, or Christ.

=== Politics ===
The altdeutsche Tracht worn by both men was banned under the Carlsbad decrees of 1819, coinciding with the creation of the work. Friedrich himself pointed to the importance of this political aspect in interpreting the work; Karl Förster recounts in his memoirs that on a visit to the artist's studio in Dresden on 9 April 1820, Friedrich showed him the painting and said, with irony, as if in explanation, "They are fomenting demagogic intrigues". Many of Friedrich's paintings feature people in this political costume, suggesting he intended a political message against their suppression; however, the sketches and most paintings predate the ban.

== See also ==
- List of works by Caspar David Friedrich
