= Alastor, or The Spirit of Solitude =

Poem by Percy Bysshe Shelley

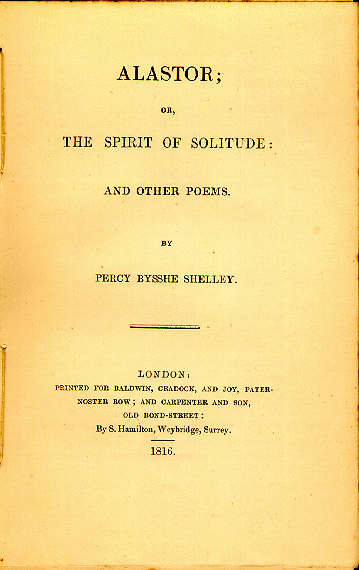
1816 first edition title page.

Alastor, or The Spirit of Solitude is a poem by Percy Bysshe Shelley, written from 10 September to 14 December in 1815 in Bishopsgate, near Windsor Great Park and first published in 1816 in London by Baldwin, Cradock, and Joy.. The poem was without a title when Shelley passed it along to his contemporary and friend Thomas Love Peacock. The poem is 720 lines long. It is considered to be one of the first of Shelley's major poems.

It is a blank-verse tale recounting an idealistic poet’s search for perfect love and knowledge. It explores the themes of idealism versus realism and the futility of abstractions devoid of human connection. The narrator relates how a young and visionary poet abandons society and travels to unexplored and desolate regions in the Caucasus and Arabia in quest of a perfect or ideal love, a "veiled maid" which he sees in a dream. "Alastor" is an avenging spirit that punishes narcissism and self-centered intellectual obsessions that displace "sweet human love" and society. Nature mirrors the poet's inner thoughts and emotions which begin as redolent and vibrant but turn barren and desolate. The poet ultimately rejects human connection, represented by the "Arab maiden", instead pursuing his ideal or abstract dream or vision. His quest ends tragically as he dies in solitude and isolation.

Peacock suggested the name Alastor, which comes from Roman mythology. Peacock has defined Alastor as "evil genius". The name does not refer to the hero or Poet of the poem, however, but instead to the spirit who divinely animates the Poet's imagination.

== Summary ==
In Alastor the speaker ostensibly recounts the life of a Poet who zealously pursues the most obscure part of nature in search of "strange truths in undiscovered lands" in "a wide waste and tangled wilderness", journeying to the Caucasus Mountains ("the ethereal cliffs of Caucasus"), Persia, "Arabie", Cashmire, and "the wild Carmanian waste". The Poet rejects an "Arab maiden" in his search for an idealised embodiment of a woman. As the Poet wanders one night, he dreams of a "veiled maid" whose "voice was like the voice of his own soul." This veiled vision brings with her an intimation of the supernatural world that lies beyond nature. This dream vision serves as a mediator between the natural and supernatural domains by being both spirit and an element of human love. As the Poet attempts to unite with the spirit, night's blackness swallows the vision and severs his dreamy link to the supernatural

He saw "awful ruins of the days of old", Athens, Tyre, Balbec, Jerusalem, "the fallen towers of Babylon", "the eternal pyramids", Memphis, and Thebes. Studying the ancient ruins of cities and civilizations, he understood their meaning and secrets

And gazed, till meaning on his vacant mind
Flashed like strong inspiration, and he saw
The thrilling secrets of the birth of time.

Once touched by the maddening hand of the supernatural, the Poet restlessly searches for a reconciliation with his lost vision. Though his imagination craves a reunion with the infinite, it too is ultimately anchored to the perceptions of the natural world.

Ruminating on thoughts of death as the possible next step beyond dream to the supernatural world he tasted, the Poet notices a small boat ("little shallop") floating down a nearby river. Passively, he sits in the boat furiously being driven down the river by a smooth wave. Deeper and deeper into the very source of the natural world he rushes. Like the water's surface supports the boat, the supernatural world "cradles" the mutability both of nature and of man.

As his senses are literally dulled, his imagination helps him sense the spirit's supernatural presence. Instead of perceiving the vision through the senses, the Poet imaginatively observes her in the dying images of the passing objects of nature. The boat flows onward to an "immeasurable void" and the Poet finds himself ready to sink into the supernatural world and break through the threshold into death.

When the Poet reaches the "obscurest chasm" his last sight is of the moon. As that image fades from the Poet's mind, he has finally attained transcendence to the supernatural world. The journey to the very source of nature led, finally, to an immanence within nature's very structure and to a world free of decay and change.

== 1816 publication ==
The work was first published in London in 1816 (see 1816 in poetry) under the title Alastor; or, The Spirit of Solitude: And Other Poems, printed for Baldwin, Cradock and Joy, Pater-Noster Row; and Carpenter and Son, Old Bond-Street: by S. Hamilton, Weybridge, Surrey, consisting of the title poem and the following additional poems:

- "O! There Are Spirits of the Air"
- Stanzas.—April 1814
- Mutability
- "The Pale, the Cold, and the Moony Smile"
- A Summer-evening Church-yard
- To Wordsworth
- Feelings of a Republican on the Fall of Bonaparte
- Superstition
- Sonnet from the Italian of Dante
- Translated from the Greek of Moschus
- The Daemon of the World

The epigraph to the poem is from St. Augustine's Confessions, III, i, written between 397 and 398 AD:

Nondum amabam, et amare amabam, quaerebam quid amarem, amans amare.

The English translation of the Latin is: "I was not yet in love, and I loved to be in love, I sought what I might love, in love with loving."

Shelley also quotes from William Wordsworth's The Excursion (1814) the lines, "The good die first,/ And they whose hearts are dry as summer dust / Burn to the socket!" The line "It is a woe 'too deep for tears'" is a quote from Wordsworth's "Ode: Intimations of Immortality".

Eight lines from the poem "Mutability" are quoted in Frankenstein; or, The Modern Prometheus (1818) in the scene when Victor Frankenstein climbs Montanvert in the Swiss Alps:

We rest. A dream has power to poison sleep;
We rise. One wandering thought pollutes the day;
We feel, conceive or reason, laugh or weep;
Embrace fond woe, or cast our cares away:

It is the same! For, be it joy or sorrow,
The path of its departure still is free:
Man's yesterday may ne'er be like his morrow;
Nought may endure but Mutability.

== Critical reception ==
Reviews were initially negative when Alastor was published in 1816. John Gibson Lockhart of Blackwood's Edinburgh Magazine wrote the first major positive review in the November 1819 issue. Lockhart wrote that Shelley is "a man of genius... Mr. Shelley is a poet, almost in the very highest sense of that mysterious word."

Leigh Hunt praised Alastor in the December 1816 issue of The Examiner.

The poem was attacked by contemporary critics for its "obscurity". In a review in The Monthly Review for April 1816, the critic wrote: "We must candidly own that these poems are beyond our comprehension; and we did not obtain a clue to their sublime obscurity, till an address to Mr. Wordsworth explained in what school the author had formed his taste." In the Eclectic Review for October 1816, Josiah Condor wrote:

We fear that not even this commentary [Shelley's Preface], will enable ordinary readers to decipher the import of the greater part of Mr. Shelley's allegory. All is wild and specious, intangible and incoherent as a dream. We should be utterly at a loss to convey any distinct idea of the plan or purpose of the poem.

In The British Critic for May 1816, the reviewer dismissed the work as "the madness of a poetic mind."

Mary Shelley, in her note on the work, wrote: "None of Shelley's poems is more characteristic than this." In the spring of 1815, Shelley had been erroneously diagnosed as suffering from consumption. Shelley suffered from spasms and there were abscesses in his lungs. He made a full recovery but the shock of imminent death is reflected in the work. Mary Shelley noted that the work "was the outpouring of his own emotions, embodied in the purest form he could conceive, painted in the ideal hues which his brilliant imagination inspired, and softened by the recent anticipation of death."

In his biography of John Keats, Sidney Colvin wrote on the influence of Alastor on Keats' Endymion: "It is certain that Keats read and was impressed by Alastor."

Alastor influenced the poetry of William Butler Yeats, whose own work The Wanderings of Oisin was influenced by the Shelley poem.

== Analysis ==
Critics have spent a great deal of effort attempting to identify the Poet. One possibility is William Wordsworth, since the poem is framed with direct quotations from Wordsworth's poetry, and Shelley had a deeply ambivalent reaction to Wordsworth's poetry, as witnessed in his sonnet "To Wordsworth".

Another is Robert Southey, whom Shelley had much admired and whose Thalaba the Destroyer, a favourite poem of Shelley's, prefigures Alastor in imagery and quest-narrative. Shelley sent a copy of the book to Southey.

Similarities in imagery to Samuel Taylor Coleridge's Kubla Khan have been noted but Shelley is unlikely to have read that poem, still unpublished at the time of Alastor's composition. The similarities might be explained by those between Thalaba and Kubla Khan, each of which was partly composed while Southey and Coleridge were in close contact.

In 1912, Russian composer Nikolai Myaskovsky wrote his symphonic poem Alastor, Poème d'après Shelley (Op. 14) based on Shelley's work.

== Sources ==
- Ackermann, Richard. Quellen Vorbilder, Stoffe zu Shelley's Poetischen Werken. 1. Alastor. Romanischen und Englischen Philologie (Erlangen & Leipzig, 1899), pp. 1–16.
- Alvey, Nahoko. Strange Truths in Undiscovered Lands: Shelley's Poetic Development and Romantic Geography. University of Toronto Press, 2009.
- Arditi, Neil Lucien. "The Uses of Shelley: 'Alastor' to 'The Triumph of Life' (Percy Bysshe Shelley, William Wordsworth, Alastor, or the Spirit of Solitude)." Ph.D. diss., U of Virginia, 1998, DAI, 60-01A (1999): 138, 213 pages.
- Bean, John C. (1974). "The Poet Borne Darkly: The Dream-Voyage Allegory in Shelley's Alastor." Keats-Shelley Journal, 23, pp. 60–76.
- Behrendt, Stephen C. "Two Voices: Narrator and Poet in Alastor." Hall, Spencer (ed.). Approaches to Teaching Shelley's Poetry. New York: MLA, 1990. 54–58.
- Bennett, Betty T. "Love and Egocentricity: Teaching Alastor and Prometheus Unbound with Mary Shelley's Frankenstein." Hall, Spencer (ed.). Approaches to Teaching Shelley's Poetry. New York: MLA, 1990. 76–78.
- Birns, Nicholas. (1993). "Secrets of the Birth of Time: The Rhetoric of Cultural Origins in Alastor and 'Mont Blanc'." Studies in Romanticism, 32, no. 3, pp. 339–66.
- Blank, G. Kim. (1988). Wordsworth's Influence on Shelley: A Study of Poetic Authority. London: Macmillan.
- Brigham, Linda. "Irony and Clerisy: Alastor, Apostasy, and the Ecology of Criticism".
- Brooks, Richard. "Frankenstein lives – thanks to the poet: Percy Shelley helped his wife Mary create the monster, a new book claims." The Sunday Times, 24 August 2008.
- Carothers, Yvonne M. "Alastor: Shelley Corrects Wordsworth." (1981). Modern Language Quarterly, 42(1): 21–47.
- Carson, Robert N. "The Solipsism in Shelley's 'Alastor'."
- Colvin, Sidney. John Keats. NY: Charles Scribner's Sons, 1917.
- Crucefix, Martyn. (1983). "Wordsworth, Superstition, and Shelley's Alastor." Essays in Criticism, XXXIII, pp. 126–47.
- Fraistat, Neil. (1984). "Poetic Quests and Questionings in Shelley's Alastor Collection." Keats-Shelley Journal, 33, pp. 161–181.
- Gibson, Evan K. "Alastor: A Reinterpretation." PMLA, 62, (1947), 1022–42.
- Havens, R.D. "Shelley's Alastor." PMLA, xlv, December 1930, 1098–1115.
- Hoffman, Harold Leroy (1933). An Odyssey of the Soul, Shelley's Alastor. Columbia University Press. Archived from the original on 17 October 2012 – via Questia.
- Imelmann, R. (1909). "Shelley's Alastor und Goethe." Zeitschrift für vergl. Litteraturgesch, Vol. XVII.
- Jones, Frederick L. (December 1946). The Inconsistency of Shelley's Alastor. English Literary History, Vol. 13, No. 4, pp. 291–98.
- Jones, Frederick L. (1947). "The Vision Theme in Shelley's 'Alastor" and Other Poems." The Years Work in English Studies, Vol. XXVIII.
- Mueschke, Paul and Earl L. Griggs. (1934). "Wordsworth as the Prototype of the Poet in Shelley's Alastor." PMLA, 49, pp. 229–45.
- Murray, Christopher John, ed. Encyclopedia of the Romantic Era, 1760–1850. NY: Routledge, 2004.
- Ogawa, Kimiyo. "'Suspended' Sense in Alastor: Shelley’s Musical Trope and Eighteenth-Century Medical Discourse." The Figure of Music in Nineteenth-Century British Poetry. Routledge, 2017. 50-69.
- O'Malley, Glenn. (1958). "Shelley's 'Air-Prism': The Synesthetic Scheme of Alastor." Modern Philology, 55, pp. 178–187.
- Peterfreund, Stuart. (1985). "Between desire and nostalgia: Intertextuality in Shelley's Alastor and two shorter poems from the Alastor volume." Nineteenth-Century Contexts, 9, 1, pp. 47–66.
- Raben, Joseph. (1966). "Coleridge as the Prototype of the Poet in Shelley's Alastor." Review of English Studies, XVII, 67, pp. 278–292.
- Rajan, Tilottama. "The Web of Human Things: Narrative and Identity in Alastor." The New Shelley: Later Twentieth-Century Views, pp. 85–107. Ed. G. Kim Blank. London: Macmillan, 1991.
- Ramadier, Bernard. "Shelley et l'encombrante enveloppe: Le Passage de l'etre a l'ombre dans Alastor." In Images fantastiques du corps, ed. Jean Marigny (Grenoble: Universite Stendhal-Grenoble, 1998), 31–42.
- Richardson, Donna. "An Anatomy of Solitude: Shelley's Response to Radical Skepticism in 'Alastor'." Studies in Romanticism Vol. 31, No. 2 (Summer, 1992), pp. 171-195.
- Ristic, Ratomir. (2000). "Shelley's First Major Lyrics and Prometheus Unbound." Facta Universitatis, Vol. 2, No. 7, pp. 69–86.
- Roberts, Charles G.D. Shelley's Adonais and Alastor. NY: Silver, Burdett, 1902.
- Sandy, Mark. Poetics of Self and Form in Keats and Shelley: Nietzschean Subjectivity and Genre. Burlington, VT: Ashgate, 2005.
- Schapiro, Barbara. (1979). "Shelley's 'Alastor' and Whitman's 'Out of the Cradle': The Ambivalent Mother." American Imago, XXXVI, pp. 245–259.
- Starner, Jacqueline M. (2008). "Shelley and Plato: Metaphysical Formulations." Online link.
- Steinman, Lisa M. (2008). "From 'Alastor' to 'The Triumph of Life': Shelley on the Nature and Source of Linguistic Pleasure." Nineteenth-Century Contexts, 7, 1, Winter, 1983, 23–36.
- Wier, M.C. "Shelley's 'Alastor' Again." PMLA, xlvi, September 1931, 947–950.
- Winstanley, L. "Shelley as a Nature Poet." Englische Studien, 1904, 17–51.
