= The Cloud (poem) =

1820 poem by Percy Bysshe Shelley

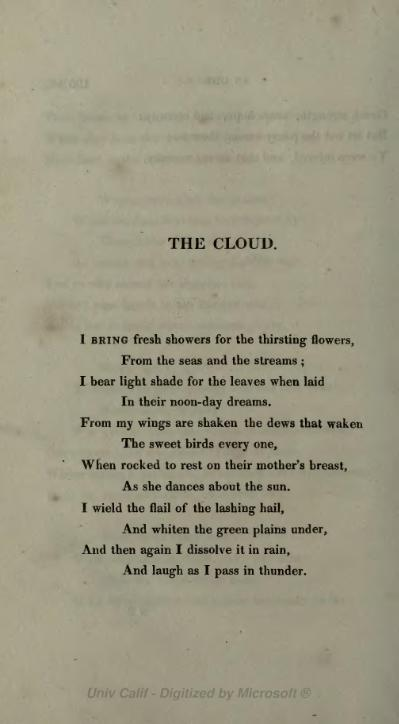
1820 edition, C. & J. Ollier, London

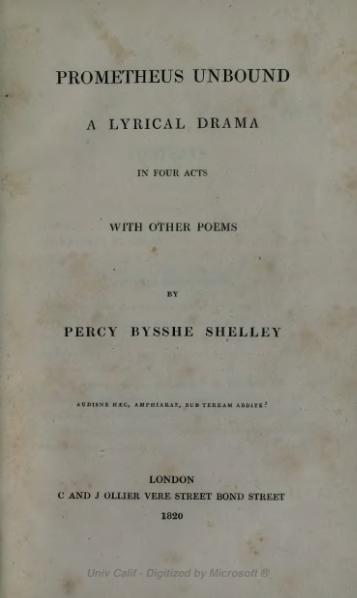
1820 cover of Prometheus Unbound, C. and J. Ollier, London

"The Cloud" is a major 1820 poem written by Percy Bysshe Shelley. "The Cloud" was written during late 1819 or early 1820, and submitted for publication on 12 July 1820. The work was published in the 1820 collection Prometheus Unbound, A Lyrical Drama, in Four Acts, With Other Poems by Charles and James Ollier in London in August 1820. The work was proof-read by John Gisborne. There were multiple drafts of the poem. The poem consists of six stanzas in anapestic or antidactylus meter, a foot with two unaccented syllables followed by an accented syllable.

== Analysis ==
The cloud is a metaphor for the unending cycle of nature: "I silently laugh at my own cenotaph/ ... I arise and unbuild it again." As with the wind and the leaves in "Ode to the West Wind", the skylark in "To a Skylark", and the plant in "The Sensitive Plant", Shelley endows the cloud with sentient traits that personify the forces of nature.

In "The Cloud", Shelley relies on the imagery of transformation or metamorphosis, a cycle of birth, death, and rebirth: "I change, but I cannot die." Mutability or change is a fact of physical nature.

Lightning or electricity is the "pilot" or guide for the cloud. Lightning is attracted to the "genii" in the earth which results in lightning flashes. The genii symbolise the positive charge of the surface of the earth while the cloud possesses a negative charge.

British scientist and poet Erasmus Darwin, the grandfather of Charles Darwin, had written about plant life and science in the poem collection The Botanic Garden (1791) and on "spontaneous vitality", that "microscopic animals are said to remain dead for many days or weeks ... and quickly to recover life and motion" when water and heat are added, in The Temple of Nature (1803). Percy Bysshe Shelley had cited Darwin in his Preface to the anonymously published novel Frankenstein; or, The Modern Prometheus (1818), explaining how the novel was written and its meaning. He argued that imparting life to a corpse "as not of impossible occurrence".

The cloud is a personification and a metaphor for the perpetual cycle of transformation and change in nature. All life and matter are interconnected and undergo unending change and metamorphosis.

== Reception ==
A review of the 1820 Prometheus Unbound collection in the September and October 1821 issues of The London Magazine noted the originality of "The Cloud": "It is impossible to peruse them without admiring the peculiar property of the author's mind, which can doff in an instant the cumbersome garments of metaphysical speculations, and throw itself naked as it were into the arms of nature and humanity. The beautiful and singularly original poem of 'The Cloud' will evince proofs of our opinion, and show the extreme force and freshness with which the writer can impregnate his poetry."

In the October 1821 issue of Quarterly Review, W.S. Walker argued that "The Cloud" is related to Prometheus Unbound in that they are both absurd and "galimatias".

John Todhunter wrote in 1880 that "The Cloud" and "To a Skylark" were "the two most popular of Shelley's lyrics".

In 1889, Francis Thompson asserted that "The Cloud" was the "most typically Shelleyan of all the poems" because it contained "the child's faculty of make-believe raised to the nth power" and that "He is still at play, save only that his play is such as manhood stops to watch, and his playthings are those which the gods give their children. The universe is his box of toys. He dabbles his fingers in the dayfall. He is gold-dusty with tumbling amidst the stars."

== 1919 movie ==
On 20 April 1919, a silent black and white movie was released in the US entitled The Cloud which was "a visual poem featuring clouds and landscapes in accompaniment to the words of Shelley's poem 'The Cloud'." The film was directed by W.A. Van Scoy and produced by the Post Nature Pictures company.

== Sources ==
- Barcus, James. Shelley: The Critical Heritage. London: Routledge & Kegan Paul, 1975.
- Bush, Douglas. Mythology and the Romantic Tradition in English Poetry. Cambridge: Harvard University Press, 1937.
- Fogle, Richard. "The Abstractness of Shelley" in Shelley. Ed. George Ridenour. Englewood Cliffs: Prentice-Hall, 1965.
- Fogle, Richard. The Imagery of Keats and Shelley. Chapel Hill: University of North Carolina Press, 1949.
- Holmes, Richard. Shelley: The Pursuit. London: Quartet Books, 1974.
- King-Hele, Desmond. Shelley: His Thought and Work. London: Macmillan, 1971.
- King-Hele, D. G. "Shelley and Science." Notes and Records of the Royal Society of London, Vol. 46, No. 2 (July 1992), pp. 253–265.
- Kurtz, Benjamin. The Pursuit of Death. New York: Oxford University Press, 1933.
- MacEachen, Dougald B. "CliffsNotes on Shelley's Poems". CliffsNotes. Retrieved 18 July 2011.
- MacLaine, Allan H. "Shelley's 'The Cloud' and Pope's 'Rape of the Lock': An Unsuspected Link." Keats-Shelley Journal, Vol. 8, Part 1 (Winter, 1959), pp. 14–16.
- McLane, Lucy Neely. "Sound Values in 'The Cloud'." The English Journal, Vol. 22, No. 5 (May 1933), pp. 412–414.
- McMahan, Anna. "Shelley, The 'Enchanted Child'." The Dial, Vol. XLVI, (16 June 1909): 399–401.
- O'Neill, Michael. Percy Bysshe Shelley: A Literary Life. New York: St. Martin's Press, 1990.
- Reiman, Donald. Percy Bysshe Shelley. New York, Twayne, 1969.
- Reiman, Donald and Fraistat, Neil. Shelley's Poetry and Prose. New York: Norton, 2002.
- Richards, Irving T. "A Note on Source Influences in Shelley's Cloud and Skylark." PMLA, Vol. 50, No. 2 (June 1935), pp. 562–567.
- Roberts, Hugh. Shelley and the Chaos of History. University Park: Pennsylvania State University Press, 1997.
- Smith, Robert and Schlegel, Martha. The Shelley Legend. New York: Charles Scribner's Sons, 1945.
- Swinburne, Algernon Charles. The Letters of Algernon Charles Swinburne, Volume 1. New York: John Lane Company, 1919.
- Todhunter, John. A Study of Shelley. London: C. Kegan Paul, 1880.
- Trench, Richard. Richard Chenevix Trench Archbishop, Letters and Memorials. London: Kegan Paul, Trench & Company, 1888.
- Vivante, Leone. "Shelley and the Creative Principle" in Shelley. Ed. George Ridenour. Englewood Cliffs: Prentice-Hall, 1965.
- Wasserman, Earl. Shelley: A Critical Reading. Baltimore: Johns Hopkins Press, 1971.
- Wasserman, Earl. The Subtler Language. Baltimore, Johns Hopkins Press, 1959.
- Wroe, Ann. Being Shelley: The Poet's Search for Himself. Pantheon, 2007.
