= Ernst Henke =

German lawyer

Ernst Henke (born 1 September 1881 in Mülheim an der Ruhr; died 20 February 1974 in Essen) was a German lawyer and company manager.

== Life ==
Henke, son of a grammar school director, attended grammar school in Barmen and Bremen, studied law and, after passing the assessor examination in 1909, became a legal adviser to Hugo Stinnes. From 1912 to 1945, he was director and legal director of Rheinisch-Westfälische Elektrizitätswerke AG (RWE), of which Stinnes was the main shareholder at the time.

Furthermore, he was a member of the Supervisory Board of RWE until 1962, Elektrizitäts-AG formerly W. Lahmeyer & Co., Main-Kraftwerke AG, Roddergrube AG and also Westdeutsche Elektrizitätswirtschafts-AG. He was a member of the board of the Reich Association of German Industry, chairman of the specialist group of electrical, gas and water works in Germany and chairman of the Vereinigung der Elektrizitätswerke and member of the Vorläufiger Reichswirtschaftsrat (VRWiR).

On May 1, 1933, he joined the NSDAP in Essen with the entire RWE executive board.

== Art collector ==
Henke owned a valuable art collection, which he built up mostly in the thirties and forties. Among them were Caspar David Friedrich's Wanderer above the Sea of Fog and Sonnenuntergang hinter der Dresdener Hofkirche and paintings by Emil Nolde and Ernst Ludwig Kirchner. Dieter Spethmann called him a great friend of art and antiquity. From 1945 to 1970 Henke was chairman of the board of the Verein Kunstring Folkwang e.V. in Essen. In 1964 he founded the Folkwang Foundation Ernst and Elly Henke.

In 1930, Henke had a residential house built in Essen-Bredeney by Ludwig Mies van der Rohe.

== Literature ==
- Georg Wenzel: German business leader. Life stories of German business personalities. A reference book about 13000 business personalities of our time. Hanseatische Verlagsanstalt, Hamburg/Berlin/Leipzig 1929, DNB 948663294, Sp. 913.
