= Mutability (poem) =

1816 poem by Percy Bysshe Shelley

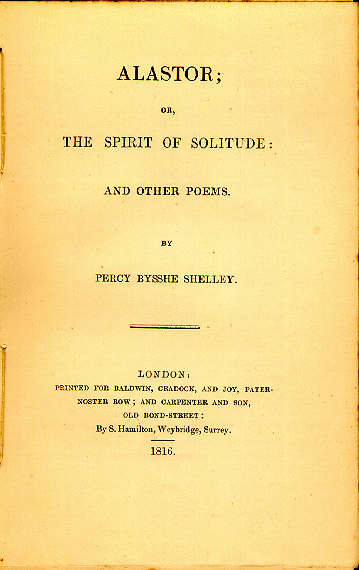

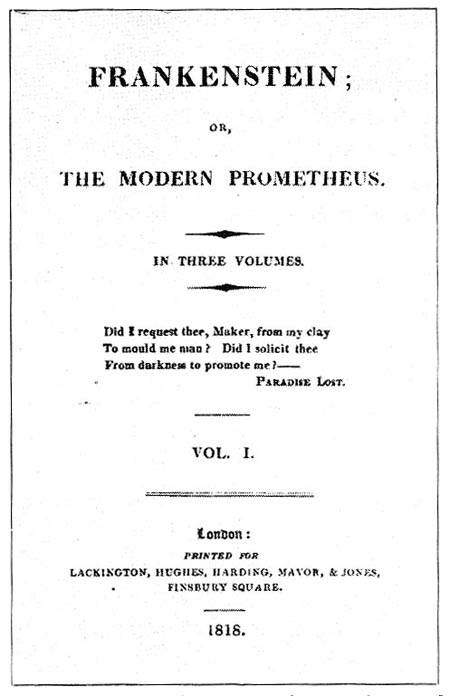
1818 first edition title page of Frankenstein, published anonymously by Percy Bysshe Shelley.

"Mutability" is a poem by Percy Bysshe Shelley which appeared in the 1816 collection Alastor, or The Spirit of Solitude: And Other Poems. Half of the poem is quoted in his wife Mary Shelley's novel Frankenstein; or, The Modern Prometheus (1818) without acknowledgement of his authorship (in contrast to the mention of Leigh Hunt as the author of another cited 1816 poem). There is also a prose version or further elaboration of the same themes of the poem in Frankenstein that immediately precedes the quotation of the poem.

The eight lines from "Mutability" which are quoted in Frankenstein occur in Chapter 10 when Victor Frankenstein climbs Glacier Montanvert in the Swiss Alps and encounters the Creature. Frankenstein recites:

"We rest. – A dream has power to poison sleep;

We rise. – One wandering thought pollutes the day;

We feel, conceive or reason, laugh or weep;

Embrace fond woe, or cast our cares away:

It is the same! For, be it joy or sorrow,

The path of its departure still is free:

Man's yesterday may ne'er be like his morrow;

Nought may endure but Mutability."

The creature or monster also quotes a line from the poem in Chapter 15 of Frankenstein, saying: "'The path of my departure was free;' and there was none to lament my annihilation."

== Mutability (1816) ==
The poem first appeared in the 1816 collection Alastor, or The Spirit of Solitude: And Other Poems, published by Baldwin, Cradock, and Joy in London:

We are as clouds that veil the midnight moon;

How restlessly they speed, and gleam, and quiver,

Streaking the darkness radiantly!—yet soon

Night closes round, and they are lost forever:

Or like forgotten lyres, whose dissonant strings

Give various response to each varying blast,

To whose frail frame no second motion brings

One mood or modulation like the last.

We rest.—A dream has power to poison sleep;

We rise.—One wandering thought pollutes the day;

We feel, conceive or reason, laugh or weep;

Embrace fond woe, or cast our cares away:

It is the same!—For, be it joy or sorrow,

The path of its departure still is free:

Man's yesterday may ne'er be like his morrow;

Nought may endure but mutability!

== Themes ==
The poem consists of four quatrains in abab iambic pentameter. A series of symbols, clouds, wind harps, describe the permanence in impermanence. The themes of transformation and metamorphosis and the transitory and ephemeral nature of human life and the works of mankind were also addressed in "Ozymandias" (1818) and "The Cloud" (1820).

The first two stanzas concern the bustle and hurry of life which only conceals its inherent transience. Human lives are as vaporous as clouds or untuned lyres that, discarded, have become like an Aeolian harp that is susceptible to every passing wind gust.

The last two stanzas concern the theme of the lack of freedom. In sleep, the mind cannot control the unconscious which poisons sleep. Human life and actions are subject to uncontrollable internal or autonomic reactions and to external forces. The path of departure of sorrow or joy "still is free", that is, it is not under our control. The conclusion is that the only constant is change.

There is also a prose version of the themes of the poem also in Chapter 10 of Frankenstein before the appearance of the poem:

"Alas! Why does man boast of sensibilities superior to those apparent in the brute; it only renders them more necessary beings. If our impulses were confined to hunger, thirst, and desire, we might be nearly free; but now we are moved by every wind that blows and a chance word or scene that that word may convey to us."

The prose version enunciates the identical themes of the poem, that man cannot control his thoughts because man has a subconscious that he cannot completely control.

James Bieri described the poem: "The Alastor theme of loss is continued in 'Mutability,' with its lovely initial lines, 'We are as clouds that veil the midnight moon; / How restlessly they speed, and gleam, and quiver.'"

The theme of change and transformation was also the subject of the 1820 poem "The Cloud" published as part of the Prometheus Unbound collection.

== Second poem (1821-1822) ==
An 1821-1822 poem by Shelley is also sometimes published under the title "Mutability". It is also published with its first line as title.

1

The flower that smiles today

Tomorrow dies;

All that we wish to stay,

Tempts and then flies.

What is this world's delight? Lightning that mocks the night,

Brief even as bright.

2

Virtue, how frail it is!

Friendship how rare!

Love, how it sells poor bliss

For proud despair!

But we, though soon they fall, Survive their joy and all

Which ours we call.

3

Whilst skies are blue and bright,

Whilst flowers are gay,

Whilst eyes that change ere night

Make glad the day,

Whilst yet the calm hours creep, Dream thou – and from thy sleep

Then wake to weep.

== Sources ==
- Altick, Richard D., The English Common Reader. Ohio: Ohio State University Press, 1998.
- Bieri, James. Percy Bysshe Shelley: A Biography, Johns Hopkins University Press, 2008, ISBN 0-8018-8861-1.
- Blunden, Edmund. Shelley: A Life Story, Viking Press, 1947.
- Cameron, Kenneth Neill. The Young Shelley: Genesis of a Radical. First Collier Books ed. New York: Collier Books, 1962, cop. 1950. 480 p.
- Constantinides, Dinos. Mutability Fantasy for alto saxophone and piano. 1979. Conners Publications.
- Hajjari, Leila, and Zahra Soltani Sarvestani. "IMPERMANENCE/MUTABILITY: READING PERCY BYSSHE SHELLEY’S POETRY THROUGH BUDDHA: TRANSITORIEDAD/MUTABILIDAD: LECTURA DE LA POESÍA DE PERCY BYSSHE SHELLEY A TRAVÉS DE BUDA." Littera Aperta. "International Journal of Literary and Cultural Studies" 5 (2017): 19-37.
- Harding, Anthony John. "Signs of Change: Percy Shelley's Language of Mutability as Precursor to Darwin's Theory of Evolution." Literature Compass 13.10 (2016): 617-627.
- Hasan, Mariwan. "Robert Herrick's Daffodils, Percy Bysshe Shelley's Flower and Abdulla Goran's Ivy Flower: A Comparative Study". July 2023. Journal of Language Studies 6(4, 1). DOI:10.25130/jls.6.4.1.15
- Hicks, Wreathea G. "Shelley's changing concept of mutability". Dissertation. 2013. esirc.emporia.edu.
- Holmes, Richard. Shelley: The Pursuit. New York: E. P. Dutton, 1975.
- Johnson, Lee. "Shelley's Music of Mutability." Graven Images 3 (1996): 114.
- Marsden, Laura. Mutability. Percy Bysshe Shelley and the Insignificance of Humanity: A close Analysis. GRIN Verlag, 2015.
- Miller, Elizabeth Carolyn. "Mutability." Victorian Review 50.1 (2024): 16-20.
- Ramage, Matthew D. Mutability. MS thesis. Bowling Green State University, 2016.
- Smith, Duncan J., Charles C. Query, and Maria M. Konarska. "'Nought may endure but mutability': spliceosome dynamics and the regulation of splicing." Molecular cell 30.6 (2008): 657-666.
- Swaminathan, S. R. "Some Images of Process and Reality in Shelley." Indian Journal of English Studies 2 (1961): 1-22.
- Yu, Jie-Ae. "The Practical Education of Poetry: Discovering Pain and Therapeutic Effects in Shelley's “Mutability” and Keats's “Ode on Melancholy”." Journal of Aesthetic Education 57.1 (2023): 51-73.
