= Woman at a Window =

Painting by Caspar David Friedrich

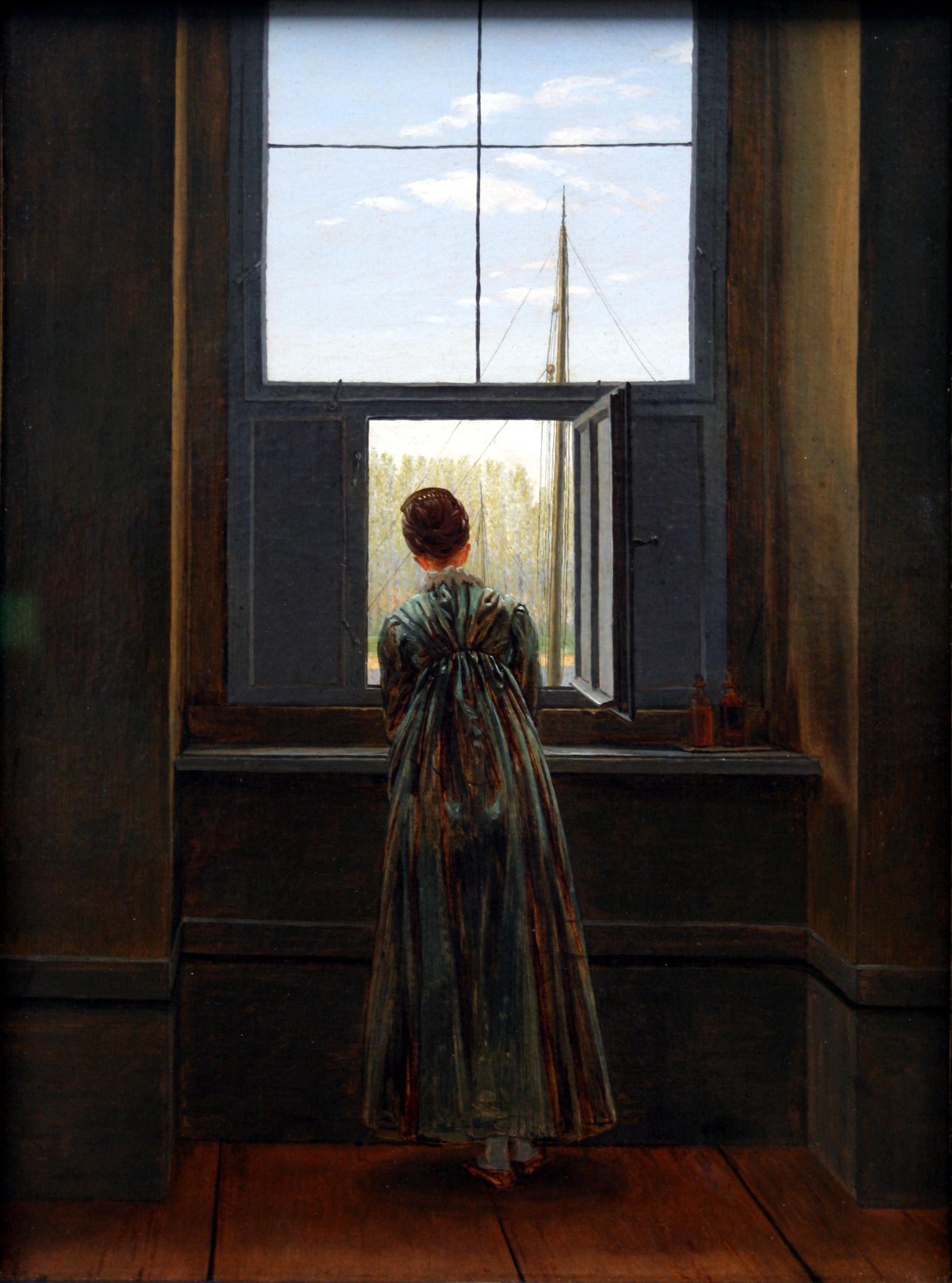
- Artist: Caspar David Friedrich
- Year: 1822
- Medium: oil on canvas
- Dimensions: 44 cm × 37 cm (17 in × 15 in)
- Location: Alte Nationalgalerie, Berlin

Woman at a Window is an 1822 oil painting by the German Romantic artist Caspar David Friedrich. This painting is currently located in Alte Nationalgalerie, Berlin. The painting depicts an interior with a woman, seen from behind, peering out an opened window. Beyond the window, the masts of ships are visible. The woman in the piece is Friedrich's wife Caroline and the view from the window is from his studio overlooking the Elbe river in Dresden. Friedrich submitted his work to be exhibited at the Dresden Academy, however he did not complete the piece in time to be in the main exhibition.

This painting employs the motif of the Rückenfigur, or a figure seen from behind, which is commonly associated with Friedrich who notoriously made use of this compositional device in many of his pieces. The Rückenfigur serves as a surrogate for the viewer to experience what they are witnessing. In this painting, the viewer is invited to look beyond the interior into the external world, as the woman does, experiencing her sense of yearning.

== Artist and model ==
Caspar David Friedrich was born in a harbor town known as Greifswald in Pomerania in 1774, many years before Germany's cities and states were unified. During the late 18th and early 19th centuries, Germany remained economically and politically weak but grew in the intellectual and spiritual sense. The emergence of Romanticism fostered a shift from the material world to the natural world evident in the German Romantic movement spanning Friedrich's lifetime. Primarily working in Dresden, Friedrich established his spiritual artistic style, creating landscapes that "looked inwards as well as outwards."

Also in Dresden, Friedrich met his wife Caroline Bommer, whom he married in 1818. Friedrich paints his wife Caroline in Woman at a Window, four years after their marriage, in their Dresden apartment overlooking the Elbe. Caroline appears as a figure in numerous works by Friedrich, such as Sisters, The Chalk Cliff on Rügen and On the Sailing Boat. Friedrich's artwork had long included figures, but after his marriage it placed a new emphasis on domesticity.

== Influences ==
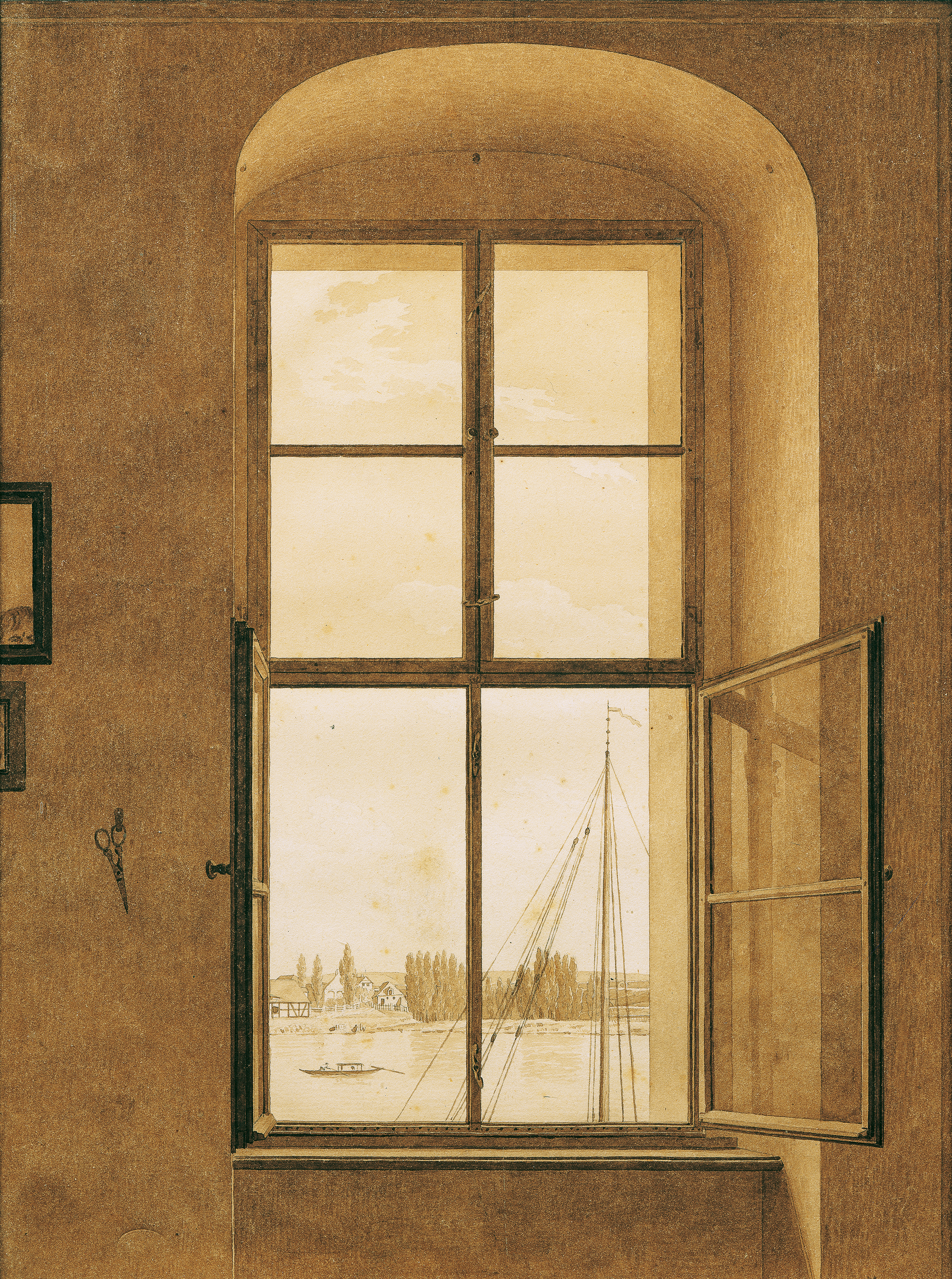
Caspar David Friedrich: View from the window of the artist's studio, right window, View from the window of the artist's studio, right window, 1806, graphite and sepia on paper

During the year 1816, Friedrich experienced what he described as a "crisis" in his artistic style, with his primary focus being on seascapes, which lacked vibrancy and formality. In the subsequent years, Friedrich's style was heavily influenced by changes in his social life, including his marriage to Caroline Bommer in 1818, after which he placed new emphasis on figures in his artwork. Friedrich's work at the time may also have been influenced by the younger artists that he became acquainted with in Dresden, including Georg Friedrich Kersting, Carl Gustav Carus, and Johan Christian Dahl. In particular, Dahl had a significant influence on Friedrich's work; the two artists were closely connected, sharing a house together in Dresden. During the time of their friendship, Friedrich's focus on landscapes and use of vibrant colors and looser brushstrokes were notable.

Prior to his execution of Woman at a Window, Friedrich created a sepia sketch of his view from the window of his Dresden studio. Beginning with his sketch View from the Artist's Atelier in 1806, Friedrich established his craft at portraying a view through an opened window, through which he represents the juxtaposition "between interior and exterior as a play between self and world, consciousness and nature." Friedrich's refined use of the window motif serves to represent both the artist's viewpoint and the view from the window itself.

== Composition ==
The composition of this painting follows an orthogonal layout, with receding vertical and horizontal planes that create a symmetrical interior. The geometric lines created by the floorboards, shutters, molding, and window sill define the symmetrical nature of the piece, converging to the view outside the window. The symmetrical interior is interrupted by the woman's slightly leaning posture, which is paralleled in the masts of the ships on the Elbe. Within the bare room, there are two bottles visible to the right of the woman on the shelf. The central figure is a woman seen from behind wearing a modest green dress, a technique Friedrich often employed, known as the Rückenfigur. Friedrich in many of his works has a similar scene, where a figure (usually seen from behind) contemplates the nature that appears in front of them, leaving their reaction unspecified for the painting's viewer. In this particular painting, the woman stands in a middle-class interior, looking out an opened window, fragmenting the view. The woman gazes at the ships swaying on the Elbe river and the poplars on the distant shore, inviting the viewer to do the same. Friedrich depicts a woman in silent contemplation, evoking a sense of longing and uncertainty.

== Interpretations and analysis ==
The central figure, Friedrich's wife Caroline, has an informal stance, creating the impression that Friedrich observed and captured the scene at a precise moment in time. The woman's posture reflects an intimate moment in Friedrich's domestic sphere. As she observes the view from the artist's studio she appears relaxed and reserved. The simplicity of the domestic space leads the viewer's gaze to the view beyond the window to the masts of the ships gliding on the Elbe and the greenery in the distance. Friedrich mirrors the canvas's form with the rectangular window within the piece. The painting itself can be seen as a window through which the viewer can see this scene, reflecting the same action as the woman within the piece. She peers outside the window into a different sphere, just as the viewer does when observing this painting. Just as the woman in this painting has an obscured view, the spectator is also “in a position of exile from, and longing for, what we can always only partially see.” Often in his landscapes, Friedrich employs symmetry in relation to the central figure; the symmetry emerges from this figure symbolizing their interconnectedness and spiritual experience with the landscape. However, in this painting, the central figure is separated from the landscape; the spiritual connection comes from her prayer-like posture and the form of a cross in the window pane above her head. The woman's highly symmetrical domestic space is contrasted with the asymmetrical world beyond the window, emphasized through the viewer's fragmented view of the ships and the poplars on the banks of the river.

One scholar contradicts the commonly agreed upon idea that the lines of the floorboards and shutters converge on the central point of the painting, observing instead that if one follows the lines, they will converge on a point just left to the direct center of the image. This off-centered convergence point is indicative of the viewpoint in which Friedrich observed the scene of his wife in front of the window and painted in this piece. It is argued in this interpretation that the piece "involves looking at symmetry from an angle," which coincides with Friedrich's goal to portray subjectivity as the individual's experience of a frame of reference.

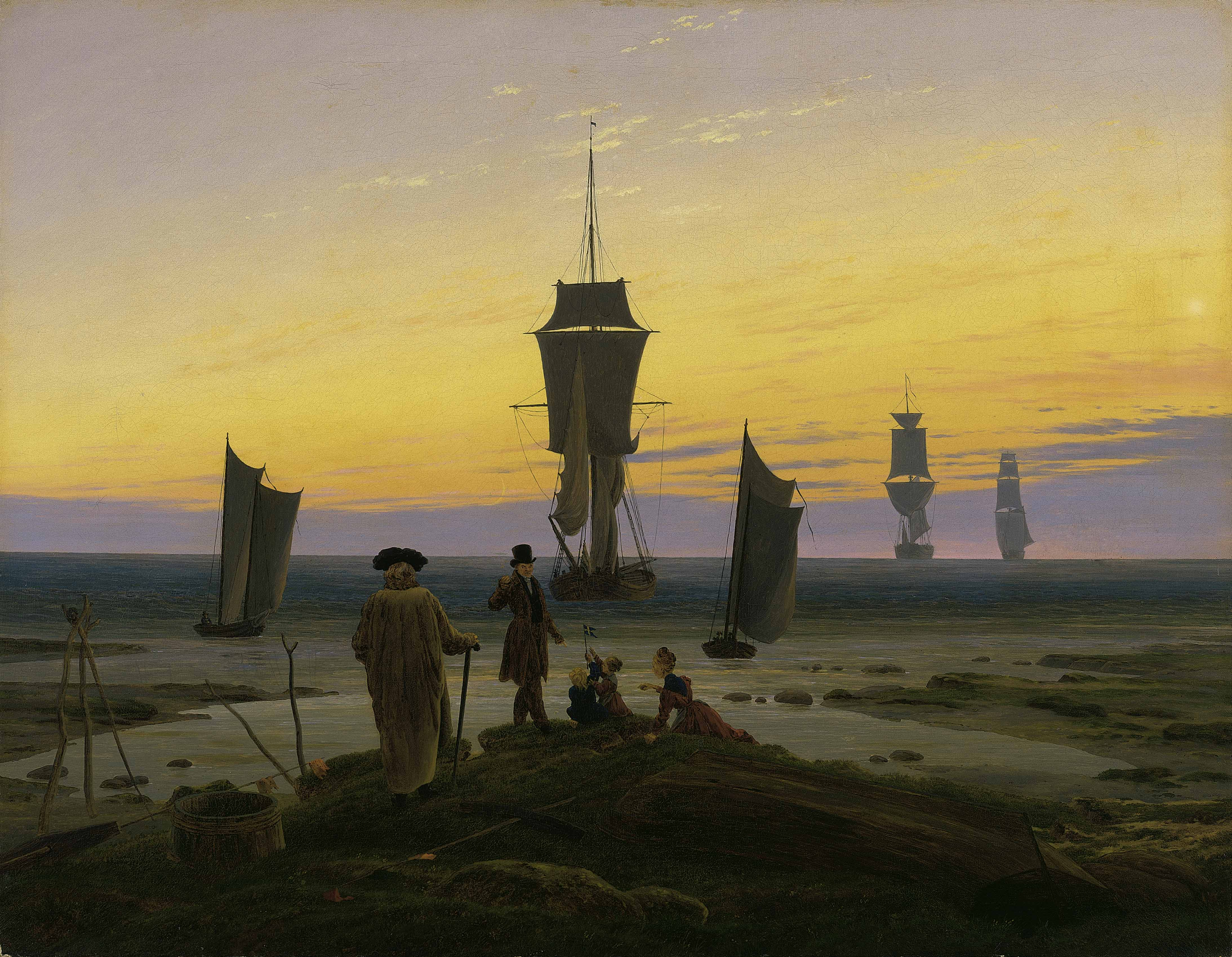
Caspar David Friedrich, The Stages of Life, 1835, oil on canvas, 72.5 cm × 94 cm (28.5 in × 37.0 in)

Friedrich often inserts implicit religious motifs in his works, which can also be seen carefully integrated into the composition of Woman at a Window. The cross-like form of the window pane above the woman's head serves as a Christian symbol which is in between the world beyond the window pane, symbolizing the spiritual world, and the interior in which the woman stands, representing the earthly world. Beyond the cross-like form of the window frame, the masts of ships floating on the river also can serve as a religious motif, symbolizing and eliciting a desire to travel beyond the known horizons to discover new places or spiritual enlightenment. Friedrich uses the ship as a symbol implicitly in his work The Stages of Life, where he depicts five ships as the different stages of one's life, mirroring the forms of the five figures on the shoreline. For Friedrich, the ship often was a "symbol of man's hopes and of the passage from life to death."

== See also ==
- List of works by Caspar David Friedrich
