= Glacier Montanvert =

Portion of the Mer de Glace glacier

Glacier Montanvert was the common name in the 18th century for a portion of the Alps glacier, now known as Mer de Glace, on the northern slopes of the Mont Blanc massif. Alternative spellings of Montanvert include Montainvert and Montvers. The Glacier Montanvert was a popular tourist destination of European travellers and is referenced in numerous travel writings and novels of the time.

== In literature ==
=== South-eastern France including Corsica: handbook for travellers by Karl Baedeker ===
- Travel writer Karl Baedeker includes Montanvert in his 1898 travel guide South-eastern France including Corsica: handbook for travellers. In his guide Bauedeker suggests visitors to Chamonix devote at least one day to ascending the Montanvert and to crossing the Mer de Glace, a journey he claims takes about four hours. Baedeker describes Montanvert as,

"an eminence on the E. side of the valley, is visited for the view is affords of the vast ‘sea of ice’ which fills the highest basins of the Mont Blanc chain in three branches…and descends into the valley in a huge stream of ice, about 4 ½ M. long and ½-1 ¼ M. broad, called the Mer de Glace above the Montanvert and the Glacier des Bois below it."

=== Voyages Dans les Alpes, Précédés d’un Essai sur l’Histoire Naturelle des Environs de Geneve by Horace-Bénedict De Saussure ===
- In 1786 Horace-Bénédict de Saussure published in French a collection of travel writings titled Voyages Dans les Alpes, Précédés d’un Essai sur l’Histoire Naturelle des Environs de Geneve (Travels in the Alps, Preceded by an essay on the natural history of Geneva and the surrounding area) in which he mentions Montanvert numerous times. De Saussure explains the popularity of Montanvert is a result of the magnificent views it affords of the Mer de Glace and the surrounding mountains. The view from Montanvert encompasses the Chamonix valley, the Arve river, many villages surrounded by trees and well cultivated fields.

=== The Journals of Anne Lister and Ann Walker ===
- Unpublished, but now available to the public, Anne Lister describes her visit to Montanvert & Mer de Glace on Saturday, 5 July 1834:

"fine morning F. 62 at 5 35/ ... at Montanvert at 11 - walked about 1/2 way and rode about 1/2 the way up ... went about a hundred yards on the mer de glace Adney [Ann] between the 2 guides - as far as people usually do go - in returning, went to the damp, low cave (in the style of Gollis but sunk 2 steps instead of even with the ground) where Pocock and Windham slept, on discovering the valley of Chamouni [sic] and mer de glace - on the stone or rock forming the roof of the cave is cut in large reddened letters "Pocock et WIndham 1747" - an hour at the mer de glace etc. -"

- It is also briefly mentioned in the Journal of her wife Ann Walker, for the same date:

"Went to Montanvert, & on to the Mer de Glace, where I picked up a little rain before we got down from the Mountain."

=== Lettres d’un Voyageur Anglois sur la France, la Suisse et ’Allemagne by John Moore ===
- In 1781 John Moore published (in French) a collection of travel writings titled Lettres d’un Voyageur Anglois sur la France, la Suisse et ’Allemagne (Letters from an English traveler on France, Switzerland and Germany) in which he recounts ascending Montanvert a journey of four hours that Moore claims could not be more beautiful. Moore describes the Mer de Glace as a sea agitated by a storm whose waves are all of a sudden stopped and fixed by a strong sudden freeze.

Frankenstein Victor goes to Montanvert and meets his monster there, where it demands that he make a female creature for him.

=== The Romance of the Forest by Ann Radcliffe ===
- In Ann Radcliffe's 1791 gothic novel The Romance of the Forest, the heroine visits the glacier of Montanvert while in Switzerland.

=== Other references in literature ===
- In the 1776 collection of travel writings by Marc Theodore Bourrit titled A relation of a journey to the glaciers in the Duchy of Savoy.
- In the 1791 collection of travel writings by William Coxe titled Travels in Switzerland, and in the country of the Grisons: in a series of letters to William Melmoth.
- In the 1796 collection of travel writings by John Owen titled Travels into different parts of Europe, in the years 1791 and 1792, with familiar remarks on places-men-and manners.
- In the 1818 gothic novel Frankenstein by Mary Shelley in which Victor Frankenstein ascends Montanvert where he meets his creation.
