= Rückenfigur =

Figure seen from behind in art

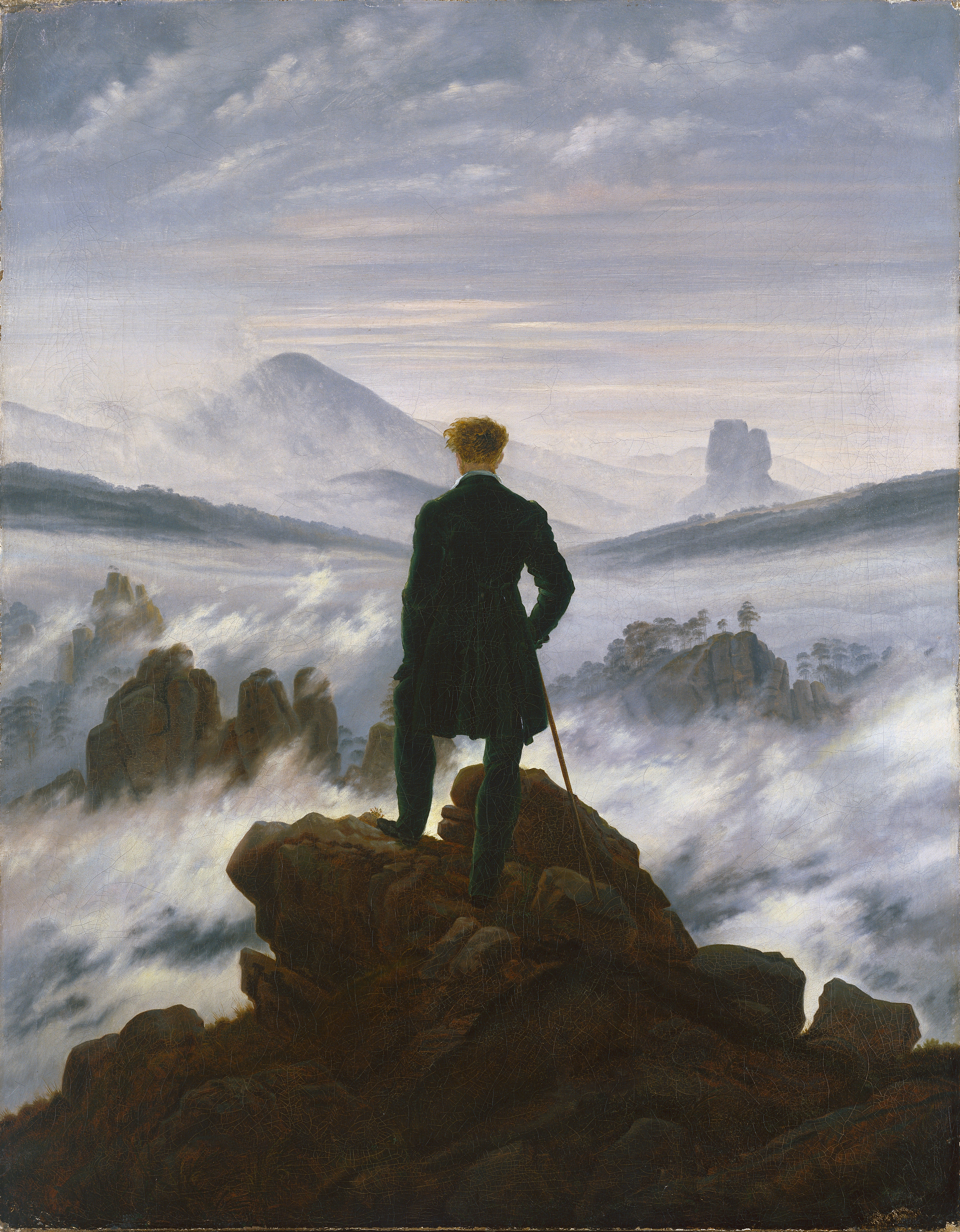
A famous example of the Rückenfigur motif: Caspar David Friedrich's Der Wanderer über dem Nebelmeer, 1818

The Rückenfigur (literally "back-figure") is a compositional device in painting, graphic art, photography, and film. A person is seen from behind in the foreground of the image, contemplating the view before them, and is a means by which the viewer can identify with the image's figure and then recreate the space to be conveyed. It is commonly associated with German Romantic painting and particularly the landscape and figurative painter Caspar David Friedrich. In art historical research, it is debated whether the Rückenfigur actually invites identification or rather encourages second-order observation.

The Rückenfigur motif dates to antiquity and has since been employed in many different eras and styles of art. Before Friedrich, such figures were not generally the subject of the work. Giotto's Lamentation of Christ (1300s) is an early example of non-subject figures turned from the viewer. The Rückenfigur may also take the form of staffage.

== Gallery ==
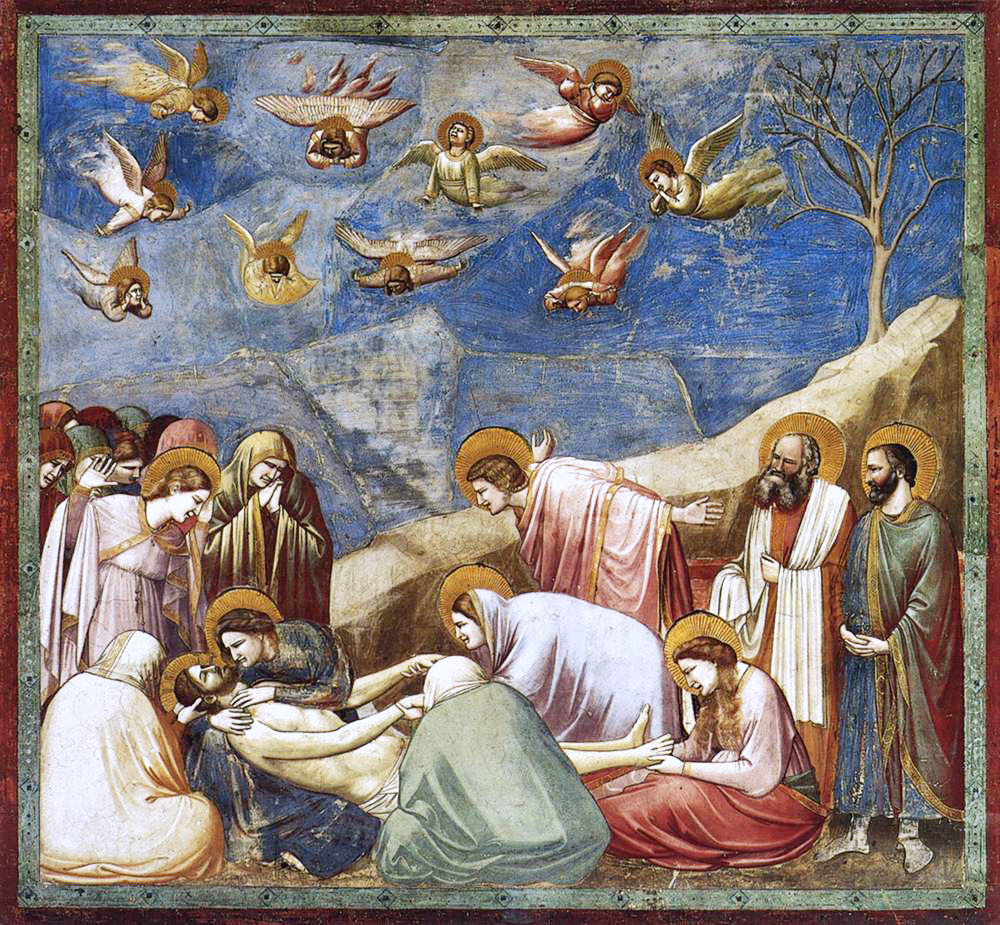
Giotto's Lamentation of Christ (1300s) fresco at the Cappella degli Scrovegni (Padova) has figures with their backs to the viewer.

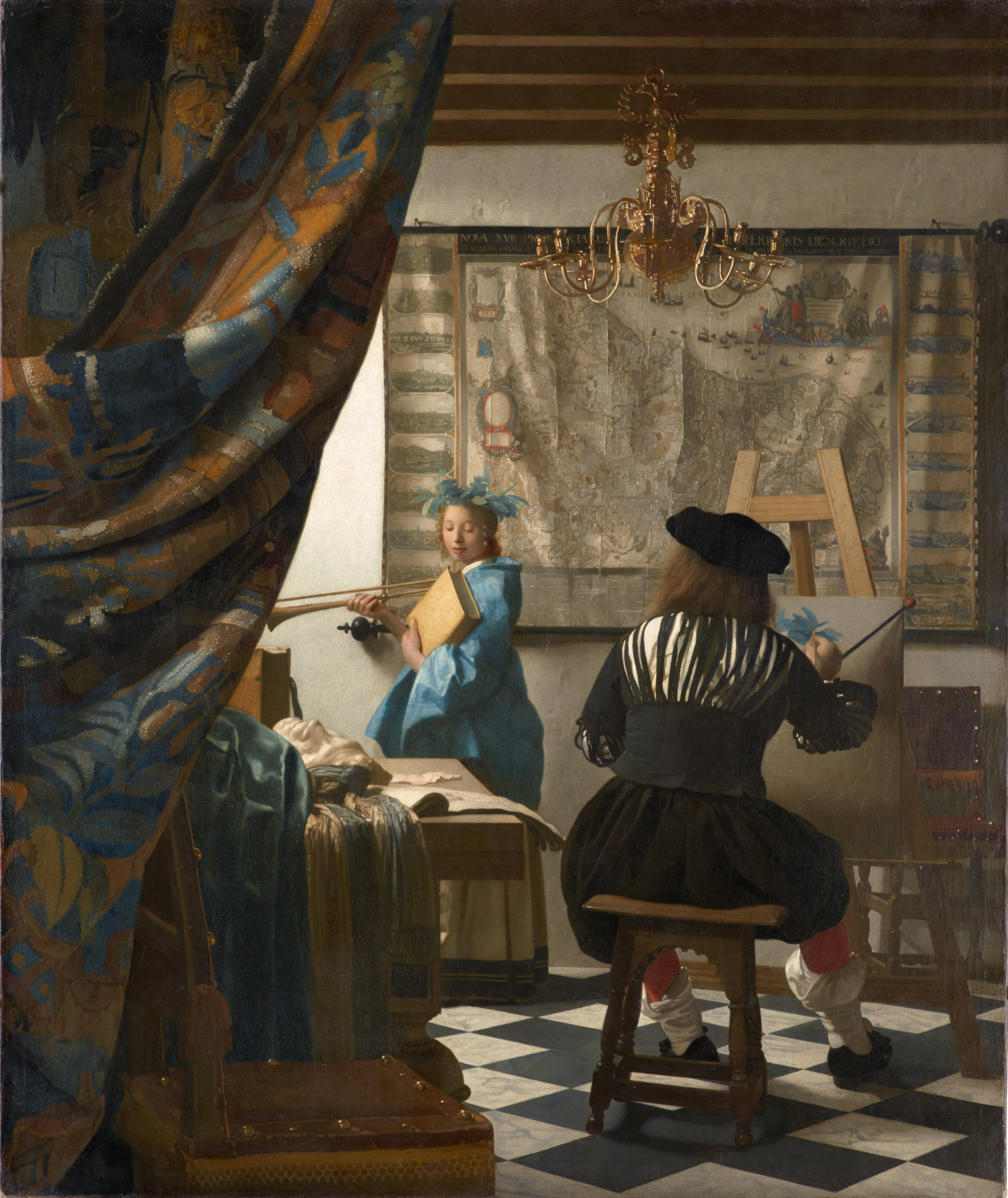
Vermeer's The Art of Painting (1660s)

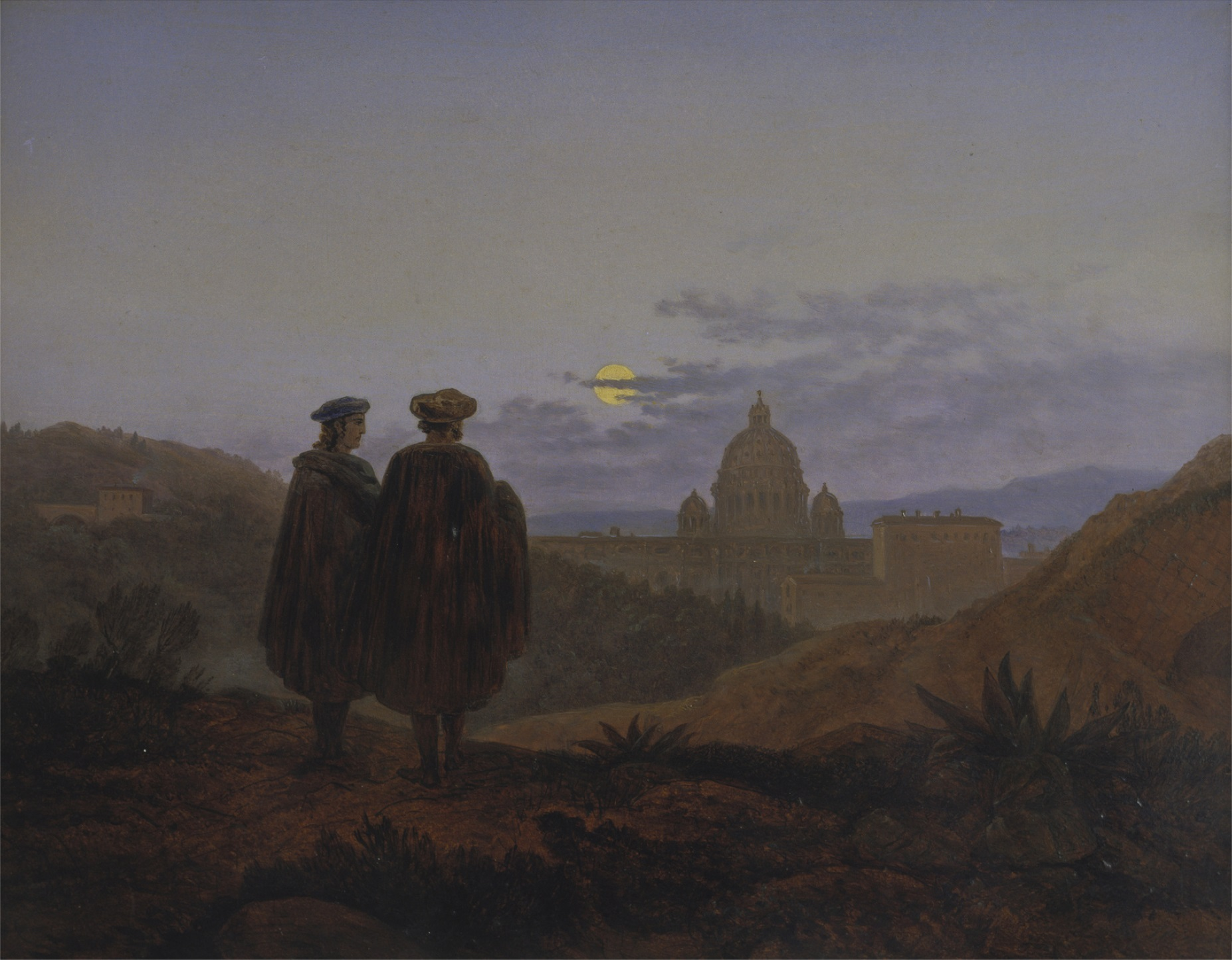
Carl Gustav Carus, Raphael and Michelangelo (1830s): "[they] emblematize the contemporary viewer's belatedness ... they belonged precisely to an earlier epoch, one before the advent of landscape; and thus their portrayal as Romantic Rückenfiguren represents less a continuity with Rome than a rift between present and past"

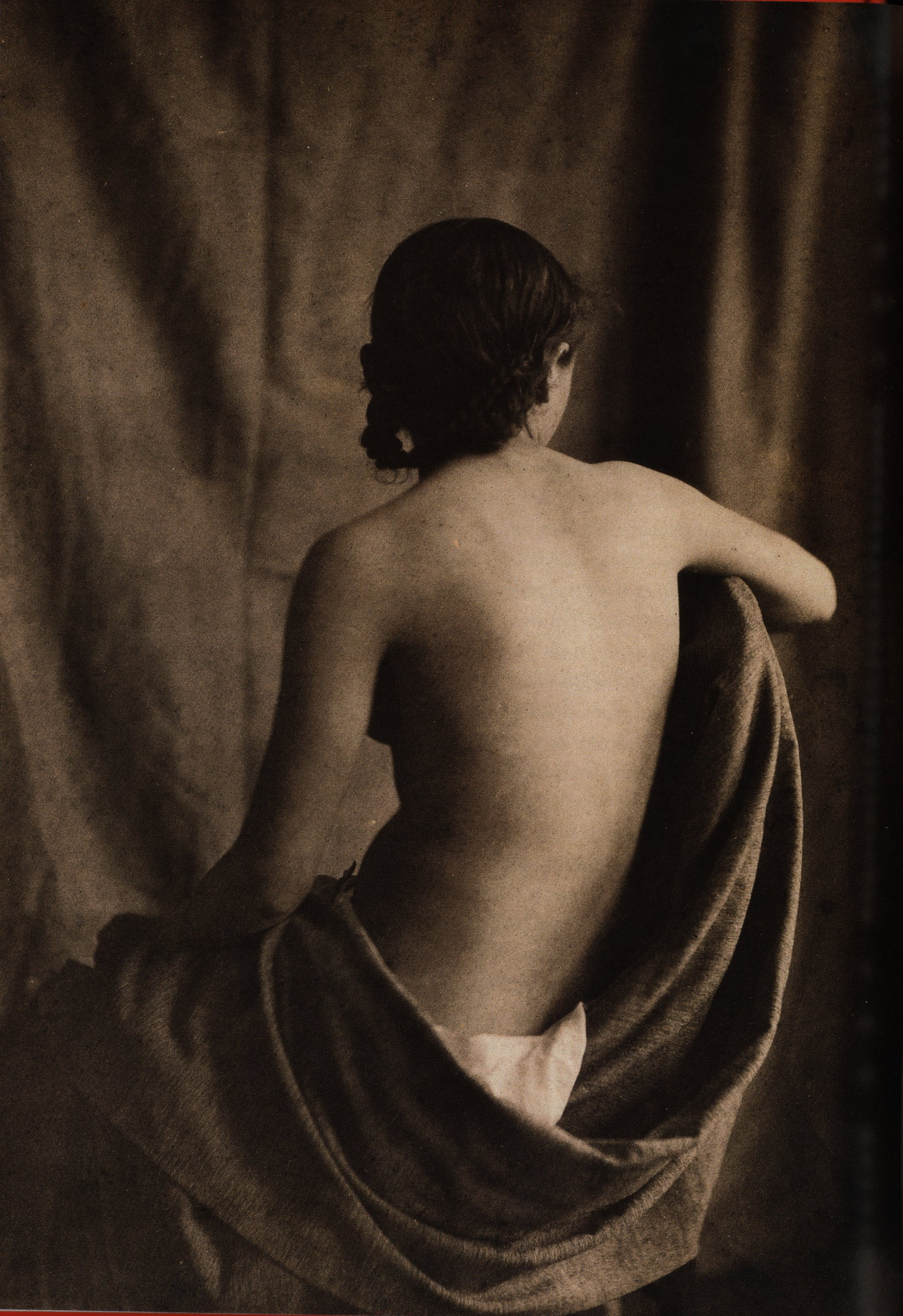
Early photograph by Jean Louis Marie Eugène Durieu
