= Altdeutsche Tracht =

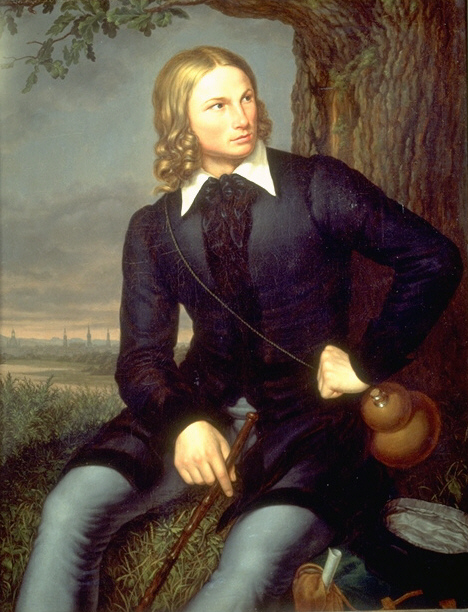
A portrait of the poet Hoffmann von Fallersleben, the author of the Deutschlandlied, as a young man in "old German" fashion (painting from 1819)

The fashion known as Altdeutsche Tracht, "old German" dress or costume (also known as Deutsche Nationaltracht, "German national costume"), became popular in Germany between 1813 and 1815, during the time of what is in German historiography known as the Befreiungskriege, the "liberation wars", the last years of the Napoleonic Wars. It was an expression of anti-French German national sentiment and met with great approval among women and men of various social strata. The new fashion was intended as a demonstration of resistance against the "French fashion foolishness", as it was described.

It is said that the Austrian officer Count von Sztáray complained already in 1800 to the University of Heidelberg that he saw students dressing according to the fashion of the French enemy:

It cannot escape the notice of any right-thinking man, how conspicuously many young gentlemen of this University model themselves according to the pattern of the latest thing coughed up by the worst class of French people in costume, moral behaviour, gestures and public decency, to the disgrace of the upright of the German nation.

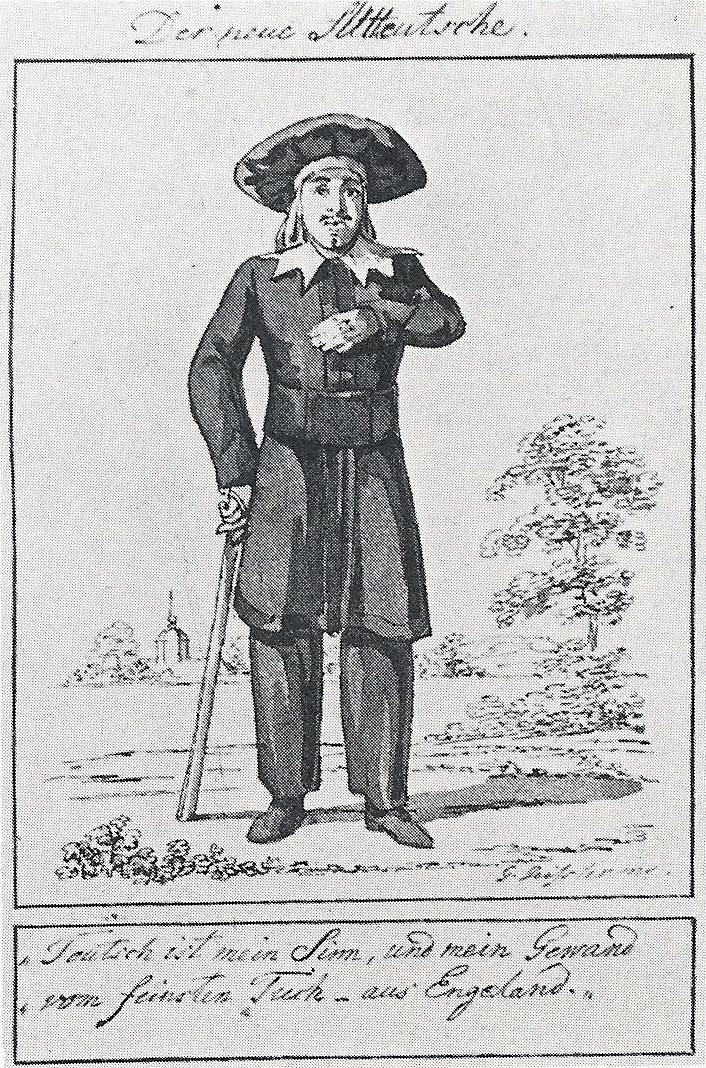
"The new Old German": Teutsch ist mein Sinn, und mein Gewand / vom feinsten Tuch aus Engeland. ("My mind is German, and my costume / is made of finest English cloth"). Caricature of hypocritical German nationalism from about 1820.

Leading advocates of a German national fashion included Ernst Moritz Arndt and Karoline Pichler. This new fashion was considered a sign of resistance against the rule of foreigners, but also against the old type of monarchical rule, and of a liberal, democratic disposition. After the foundation of the Urburschenschaft in Jena in 1815, it became a sign of belonging to the student Burschenschaften, who wanted to stand out from the traditionally minded, regionally oriented corps students.

The most prominent bearer of this fashion was the Bavarian Crown Prince Ludwig, the later King Ludwig I.

Deutsche National-Frauentracht (German national costume for women"), Journal des Luxus und der Moden 1815

The new fashion built on the elements of the fashion of the time, supplemented through reminiscences of the 16th century, the period of the Reformation and Martin Luther, which were seen as characteristically German. In the female form, the historical elements added to the fashion included slashed and puffed sleeves, and ruffled collars. The most important piece of clothing for men was a long tight-fitting coat that was often worn with a widely opened collar. To this came widely cut trousers and often a large velvet beret. The dominant colour was black, the colour of the uniforms of many Freikorps during the liberation war. In particular among the young men, a rebellious behaviour and unkempt hair and beards were also common.

The fashion was seen as provocative and rebellious enough to be partly prohibited by the authorities during the persecution of "demagogues" (see also Carlsbad Decrees).
