= Cairn in Snow =

Painting by Caspar David Friedrich

- German: Hünengrab im Schnee
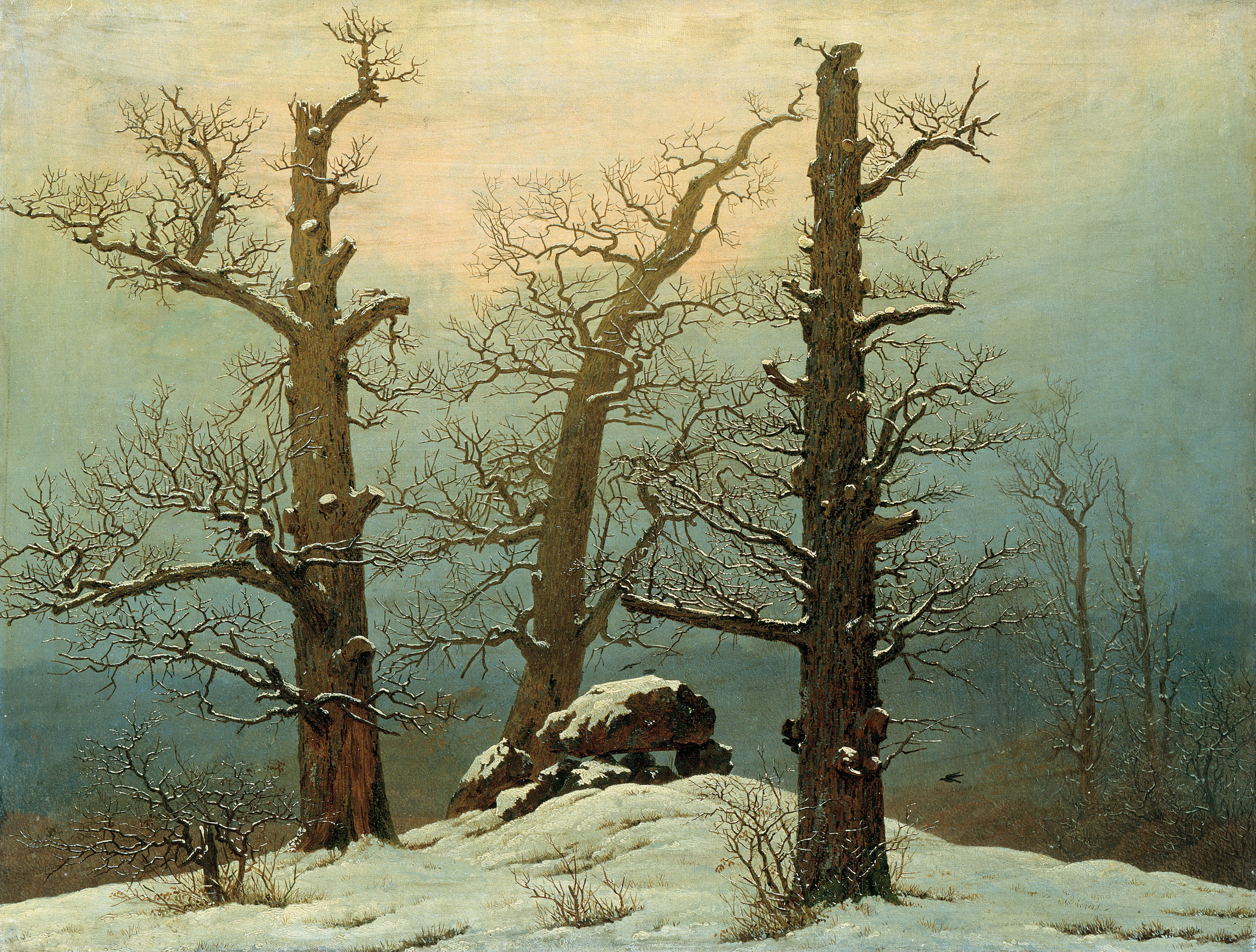
- Artist: Caspar David Friedrich
- Year: 1807
- Medium: Oil on canvas
- Dimensions: 61 cm × 80 cm (24 in × 31 in)
- Location: Galerie Neue Meister, Dresden

Cairn in Snow, also known as Dolmen in the snow, (German: Hünengrab im Schnee, literally "Giant's grave in the snow") is a landscape painting by the German painter Caspar David Friedrich. Friedrich is noted for his landscapes depicting features such as trees or Gothic ruins, silhouetted against the sky or in morning mists. The painting depicts leafless trees in the winter snow, with the tops of two of the trees broken off and the third bent by the prevailing wind, giving the work a haunted, spectral air. It is a Romantic allegorical landscape, depicting a stone cairn or dolmen set amid three oak trees on a hilltop, with a contemplative melancholy mood. It was probably painted around 1807, making it among Friedrich's first oil paintings. It measures 61 by 80 centimetres (24 in × 31 in) and has been held by the Galerie Neue Meister in Dresden since 1905.

The main elements of the painting are taken from different locations in eastern Germany. The cairn is thought to be based on the Neolithic burial site at Großsteingrab Gützkow, near the town Gützkow in West Pomerania; the megalith was destroyed before 1818, but Friedrich had sketched it since at least 1802. Friedrich sketched the trees at Neubrandenburg, most clearly an 1807 sepia sketch Hünengrab am Meer ("Dolmen by the sea"). Similar oak trees reappear in several works by Friedrich, including Monk in the Snow (1808, also known as Winter), The Abbey in the Oakwood (1818), Monastery graveyard under snow (1818) and Oak tree in snow (1829). The hill is located near Wustrow. The painting also includes four ravens, two above the cairn, one to the right, and a fourth high in the tree to the right.

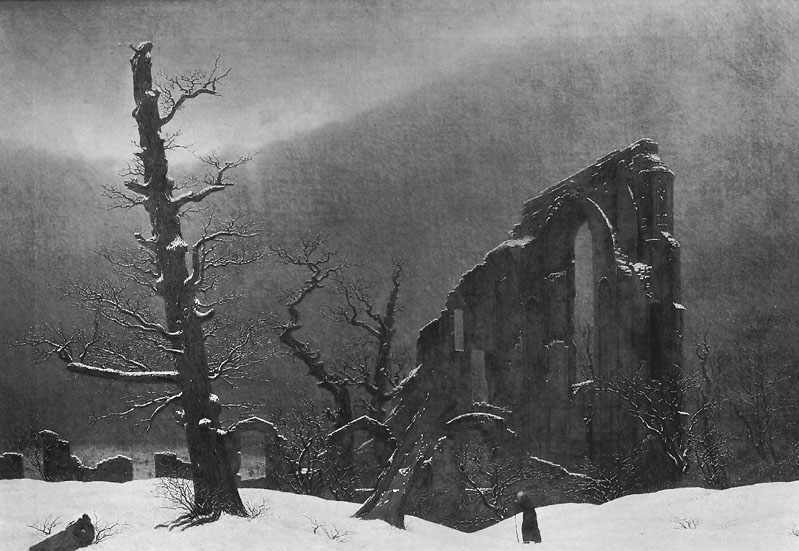
Caspar David Friedrich: Monk in the Snow, also known as Winter, 1808

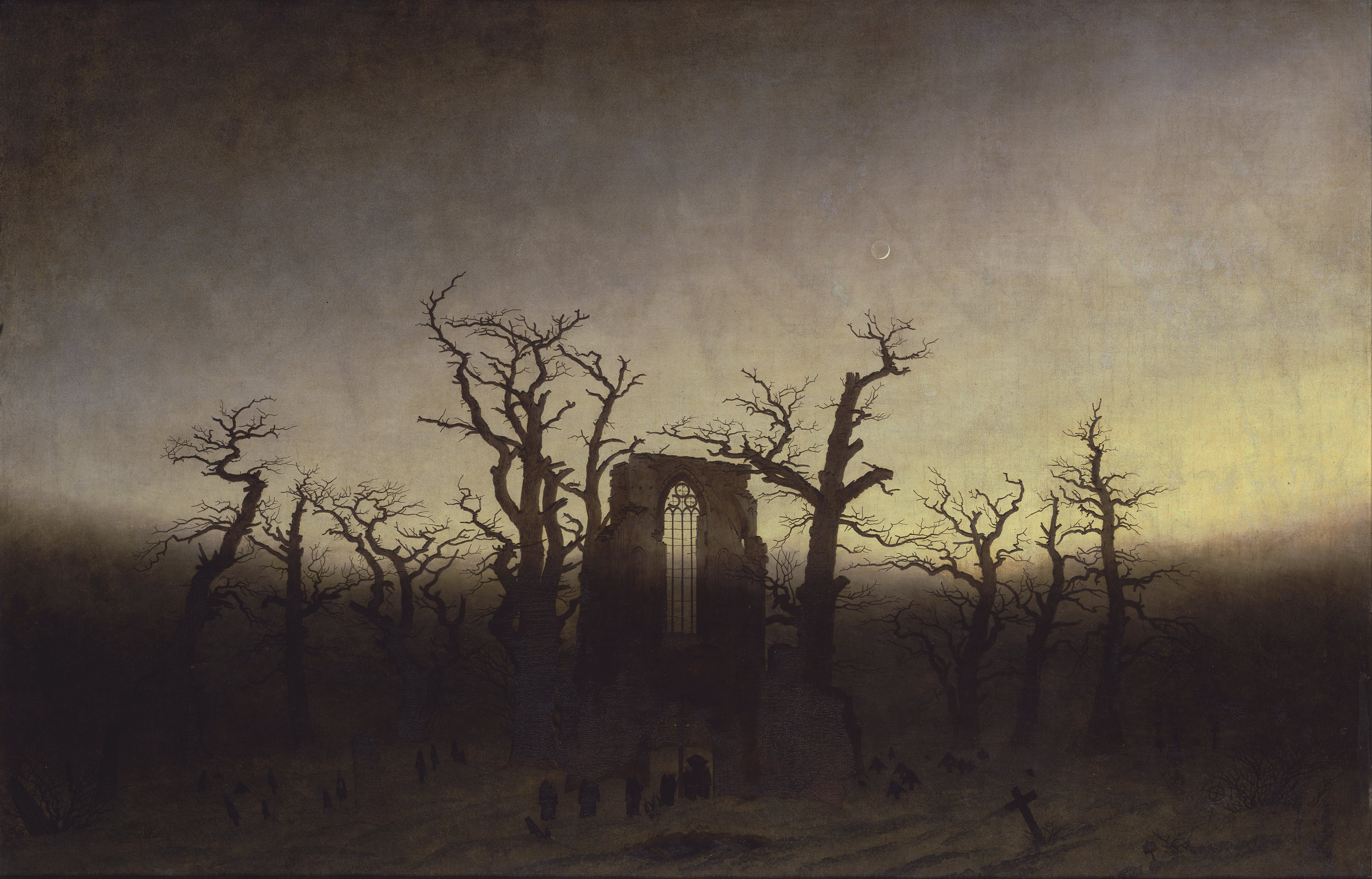
Caspar David Friedrich: The Abbey in the Oakwood, 1809

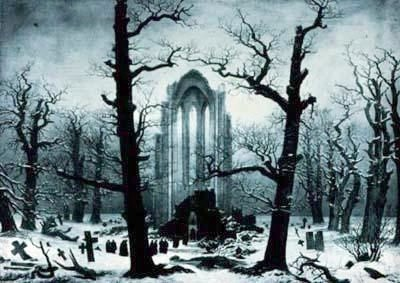
Caspar David Friedrich: Monastery graveyard under snow, 1818

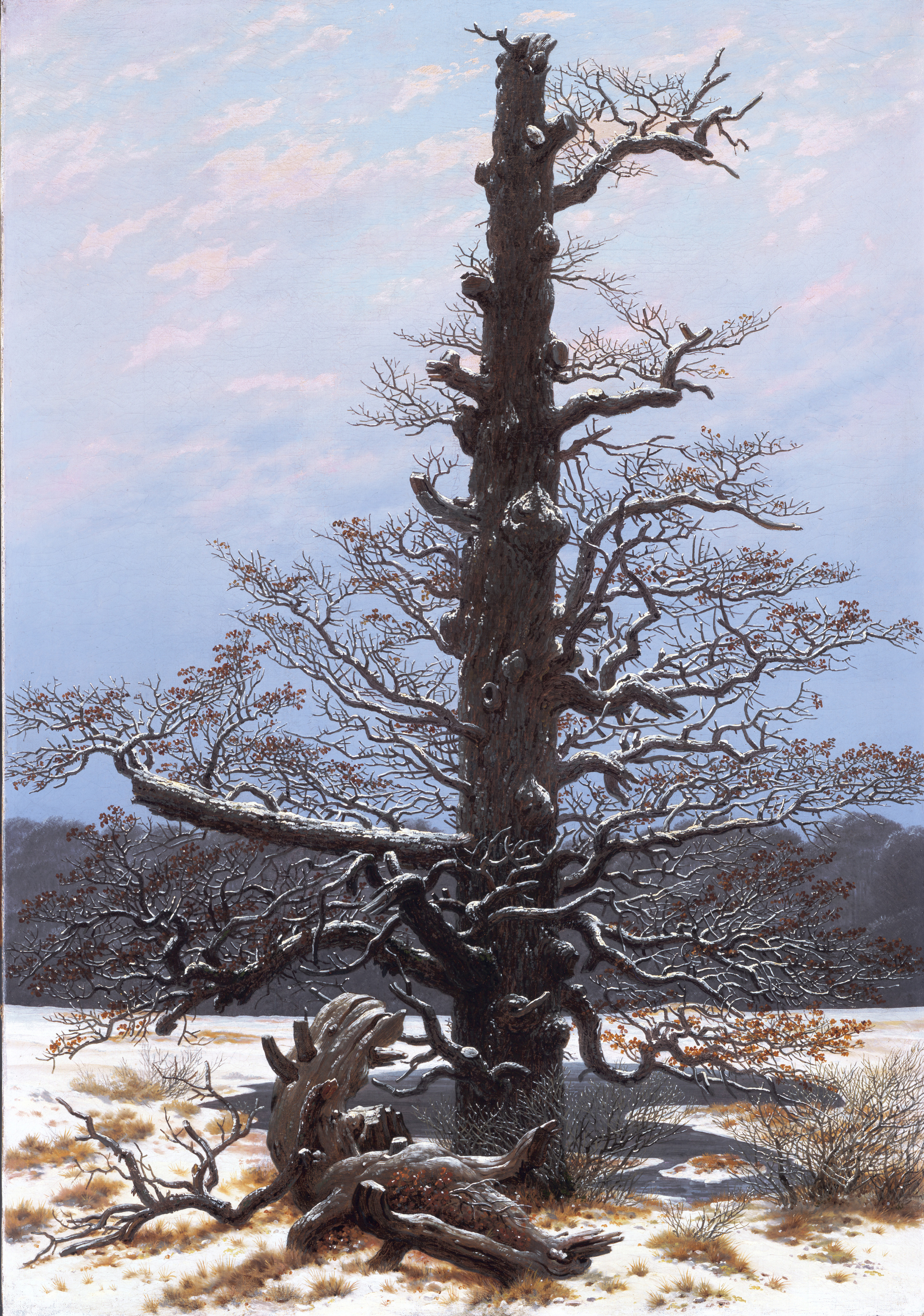
Caspar David Friedrich: Oak tree in snow, 1829

The painting alludes to Christian and pagan symbolism. Trees and forests were seen as symbols of life endurance, longevity, and immortality. Sacred groves, often a group of trees in ancient times, were associated with secrecy and initiation rites, and they were regarded as untouchable. The main trees depicted in this painting by Friedrich appear to have had most of their old branches chopped off. The three trees around the cairn recalls the three wooden crosses on Golgotha at the crucifixion of Jesus, and the stone chamber where Christ's body was entombed. The painting also alludes to the permanence of the ancient stone landmark, the strength of the oak tree to withstand the storm broken and bowed but not defeated, and the continuity of life in the middle of winter.

Art critics have interpreted the painting as a meditation on life and death, and on the political situation in Germany following the defeats of Prussia by Napoleon's French army at the twin battles of Jena and Auerstedt in 1806. Around the same times, Friedrich was working on his 1807 Tetschen Altar.

The painting was first owned by the Greifswald University professor Karl Schildener. It is described in 1828 in the Greifswald academical journal (II, 2, pp. 40–41). The work was sold at auction in Leipzig in 1845 and acquired by Friedrich's friend and fellow painter Johan Christian Dahl. Dahl imitated the work in his own painting, Megalithic Tomb in Winter. It was sold from the estate of Dahl's only surviving son, Johann Siegwald Dahl, and acquired by the Galerie Neue Meister in Dresden in 1905.

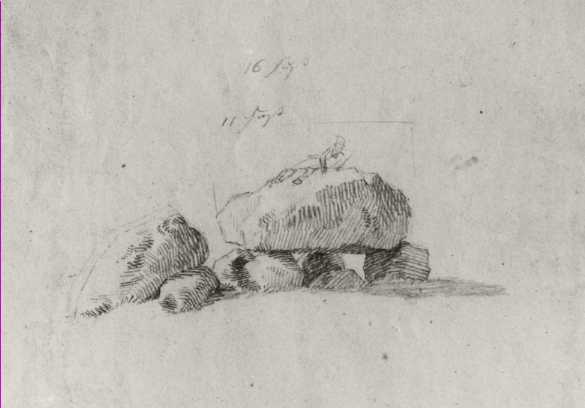
Caspar David Friedrich: Hünengrab bei Gützkow, 1802

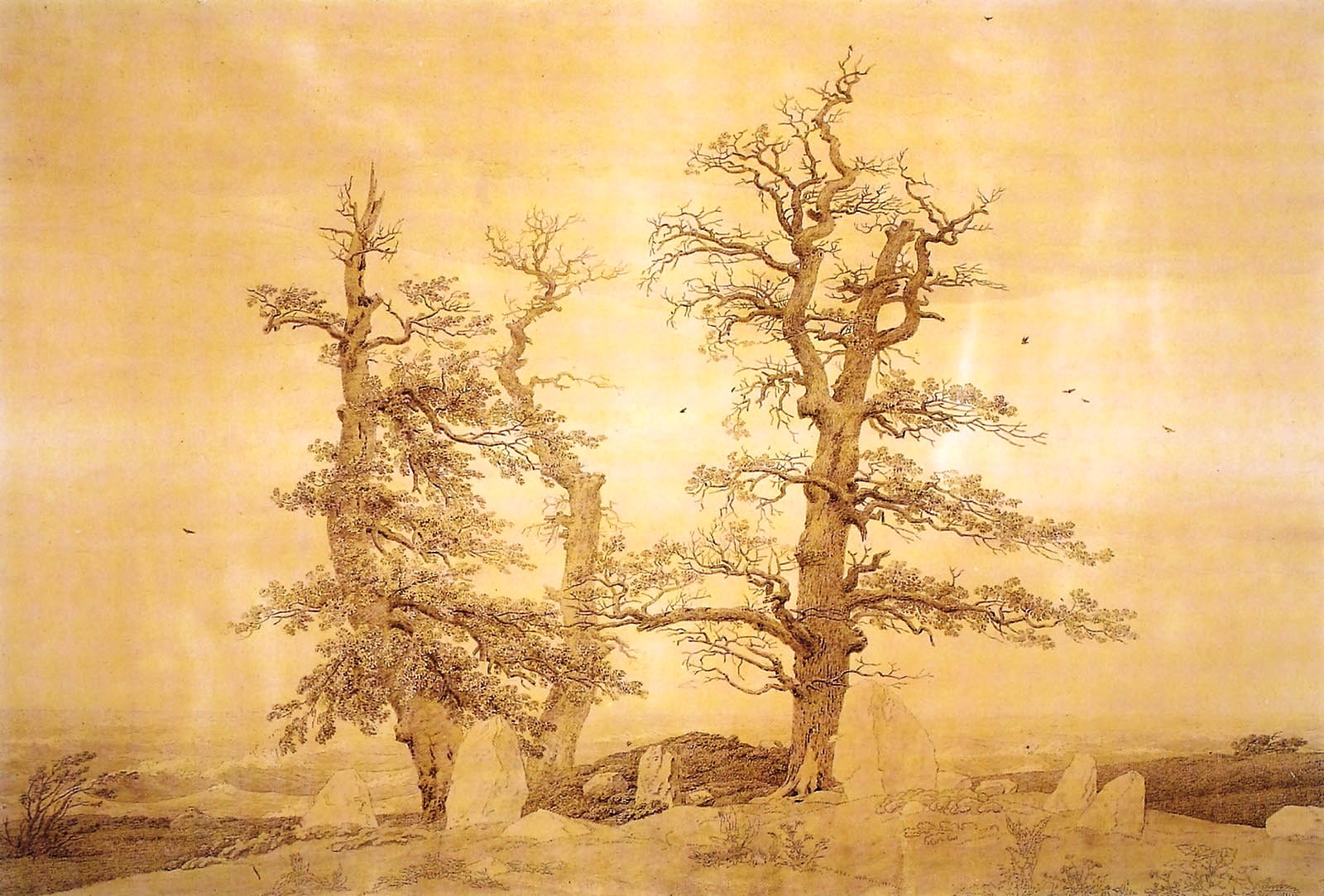
Caspar David Friedrich: Hünengrab am Meer, 1807

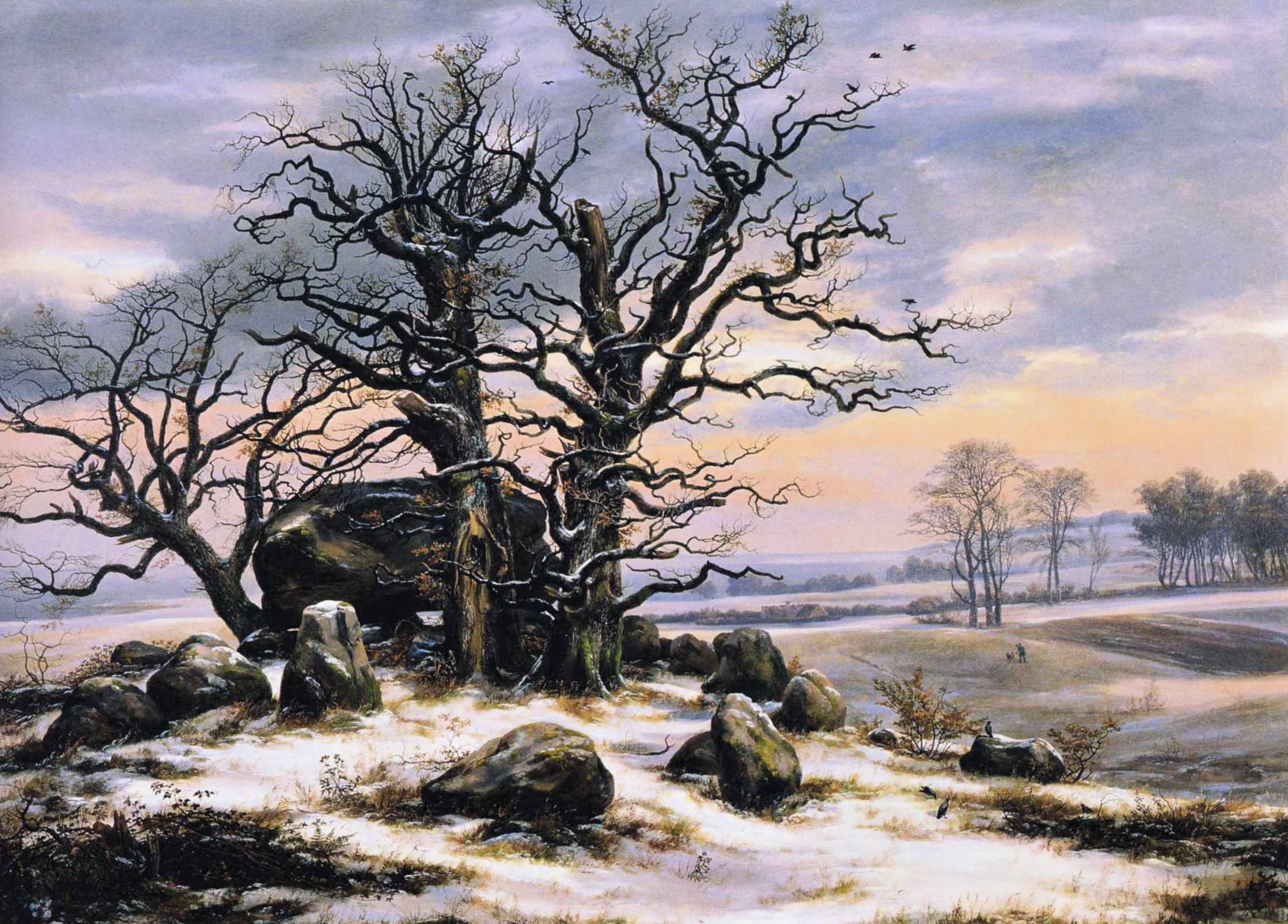
Johan Christian Dahl: Megalith Grave in Winter, 1824–25

== See also ==
- List of works by Caspar David Friedrich
