= Galerie Neue Meister =

Art museum in Dresden, Germany

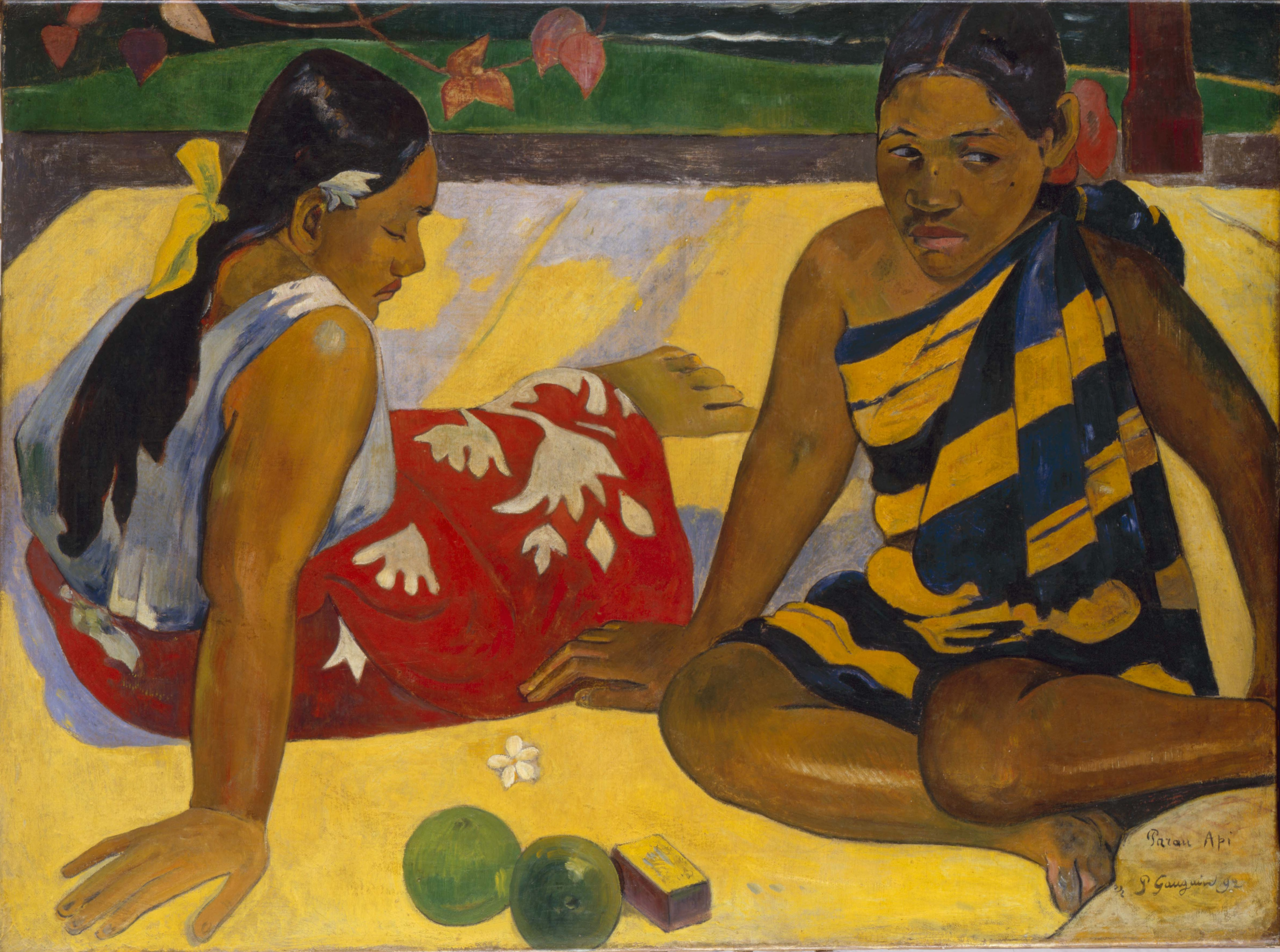
- Two Women of Tahiti by Paul Gauguin
- Interactive fullscreen map
- Location: Dresden, Germany
- Coordinates: 51°03′07″N 13°44′40″E

The Galerie Neue Meister (German pronunciation: [ɡaləˈʁiː ˈnɔʏə ˈmaɪstɐ], New Masters Gallery) in Dresden, Germany, displays around 300 paintings from the 19th century until today, including works from Otto Dix, Edgar Degas, Vincent van Gogh and Claude Monet. The gallery also exhibits a number of sculptures from the Dresden Sculpture Collection from the same period. The museum's collection grew out of the Old Masters Gallery, for which contemporary works were increasingly purchased after 1843.

The New Masters Gallery is part of the Staatliche Kunstsammlungen (State Art Collections) of Dresden. It is located in the Albertinum.

== History ==
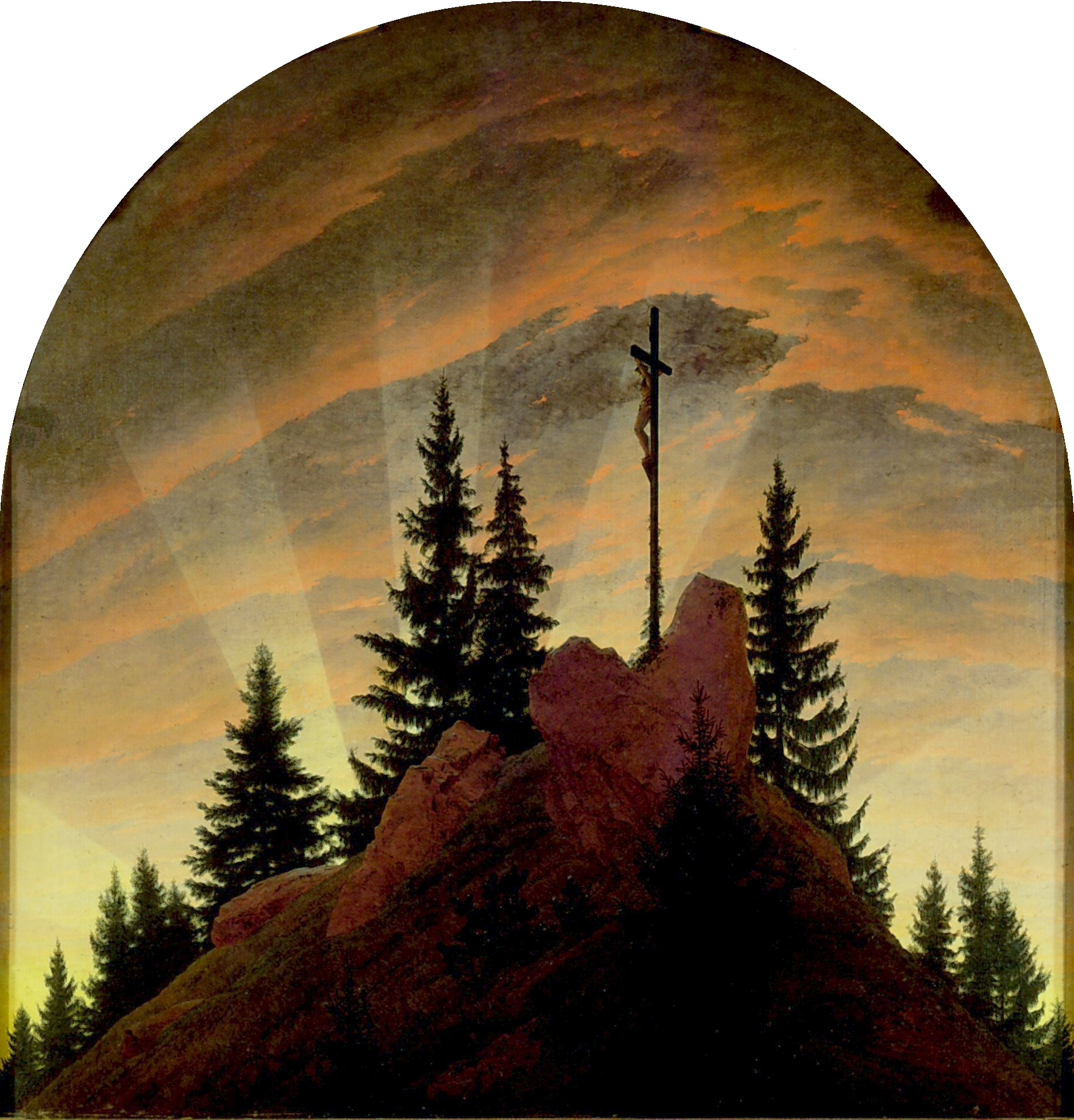
Cross in the Mountains (Tetschen Altar) by Caspar David Friedrich, 1808

The collection began as part of the Dresden Painting Gallery. The purchase of contemporary works, creating the "Modern Department", was stepped up in 1843 under Bernhard von Lindenau, director of the Royal Museums, who personally donated 700 talers each year for this purpose. The Academic Council, responsible for the gallery and the Academy of Fine Arts, also contributed 50 percent of the proceeds from its exhibitions towards new purchases. However, these funds were only enough for limited acquisitions, mostly restricted to German works.

Until 1882 the collection contained only four major German Romanticism works; two paintings by Caspar David Friedrich and two works by Ludwig Richter. It was subsequently expanded under director Karl Woermann. The gallery first started to buy foreign contemporary works following an international art exhibition in Dresden in 1897.

Under Hans Posse, director from 1910, the gallery enlarged its collections of German Romanticism, Impressionism, and late 19th century "Civic Realism" (Bürgerlicher Realismus), which are still important today. The gallery was financially strengthened by the founding of the Dresden Museums Association in 1911 and the Patrons Association in 1917.

In 1931, the Modern Department of the gallery with paintings from the 19th and 20th centuries moved into a separate building on Brühl's Terrace, laying the foundations for what is now known as the New Masters Gallery. The Nazi campaign against "degenerate art" resulted in the confiscation and sale of 56 paintings, including works by Edvard Munch, Max Beckmann and Emil Nolde. In the 1945 bombing of Dresden, 196 paintings were destroyed by fire while on a truck.

The present-day New Masters Gallery was founded in 1959, and has been housed in the upper rooms of the Albertinum since 1965. Subsequently, the gallery was able to retrieve a number of works that had been lost during and after World War II.

The floods of 2002 made it necessary to renovate the Albertinum and build a new flood-proof depot. The Albertinum reopened in June 2010 with an enlargement to the "Salzgasse Wing". Its rooms were once occupied by the Green Vault that was moved to the renovated Dresden Castle at that time. Special exhibitions of contemporary art are now held there.

== Collection ==
Some 300 paintings out of a collection of about 3,000 works are exhibited in the gallery. They date from the 19th century until today. Also shown are works from the Sculpture Collection belonging to the same period.

On display are paintings by numerous major artists, including those of the German Romantics Friedrich (Ships in Harbour, Evening), and Richter; the Impressionists Corinth and Slevogt; and the Expressionist Nolde, including his Brücke works, and Dix from the New Objectivity movement. There are also works by Beckmann, Gauguin, Kirchner, Klee, Modersohn-Becker, Monet, Munch, and one painting by Van Gogh. Rooms are devoted to Georg Baselitz, A.R. Penck and Gerhard Richter. Contemporary artists include Neo Rauch and Luc Tuymans.

== Highlights of the collection ==
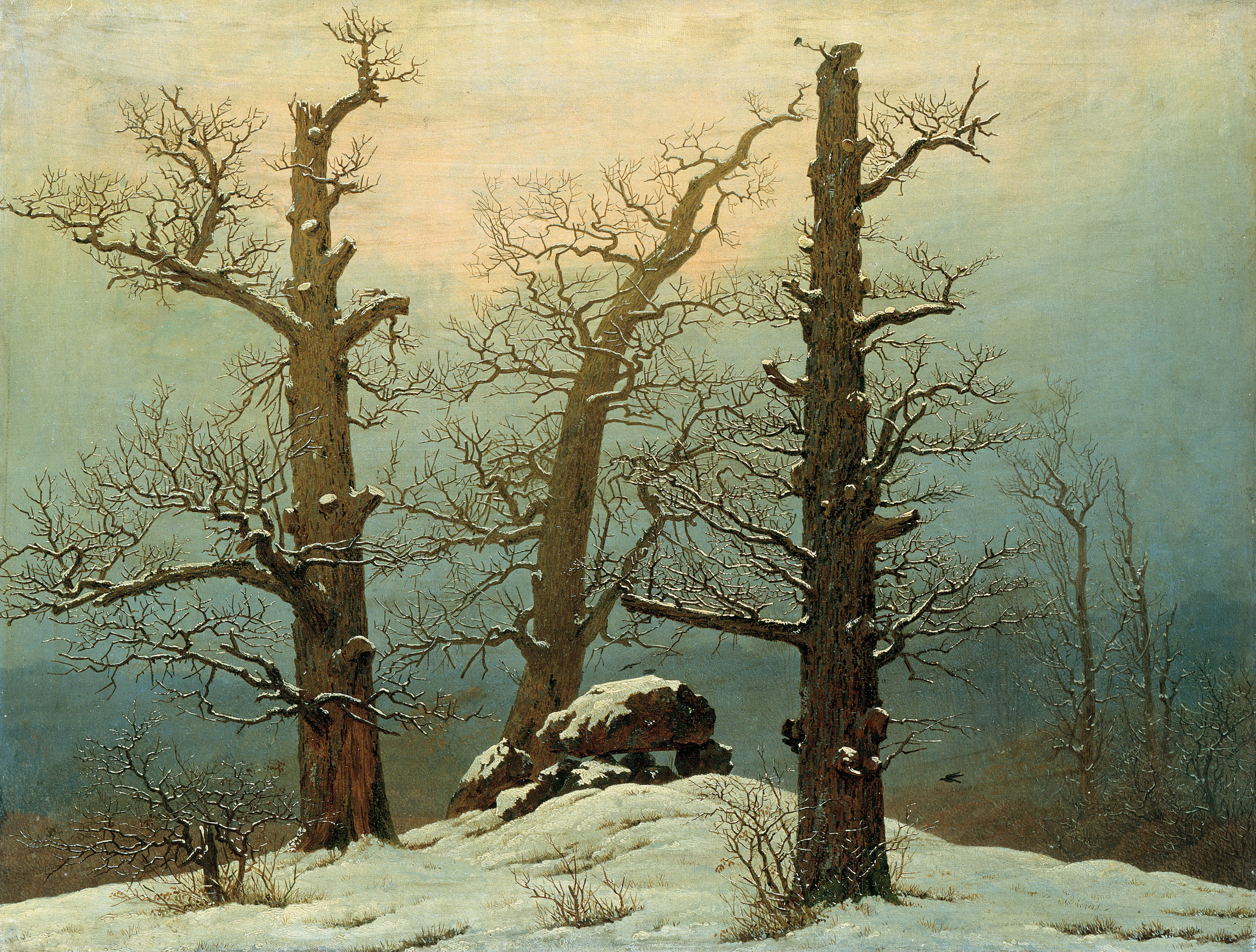
Caspar David Friedrich: Cairn in Snow, 1807

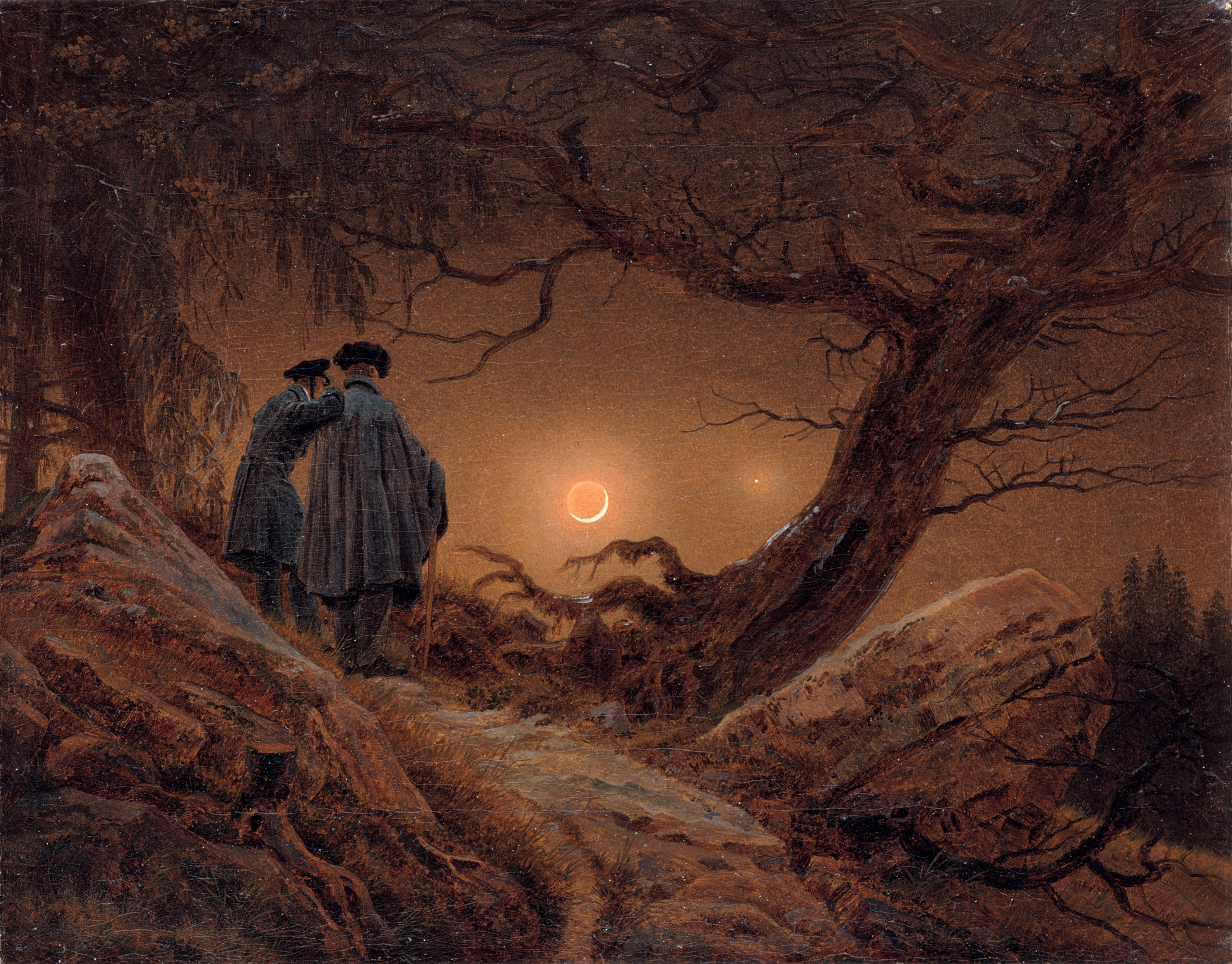
Caspar David Friedrich: Two Men Contemplating the Moon, 1819-20

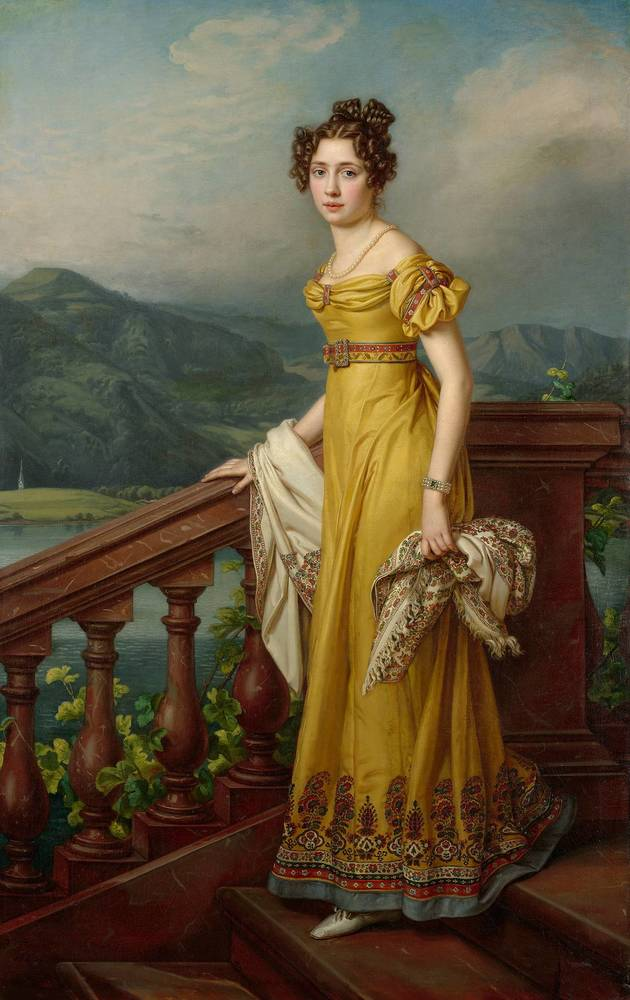
Joseph Karl Stieler: Portrait of Amalie Auguste of Bavaria, 1823

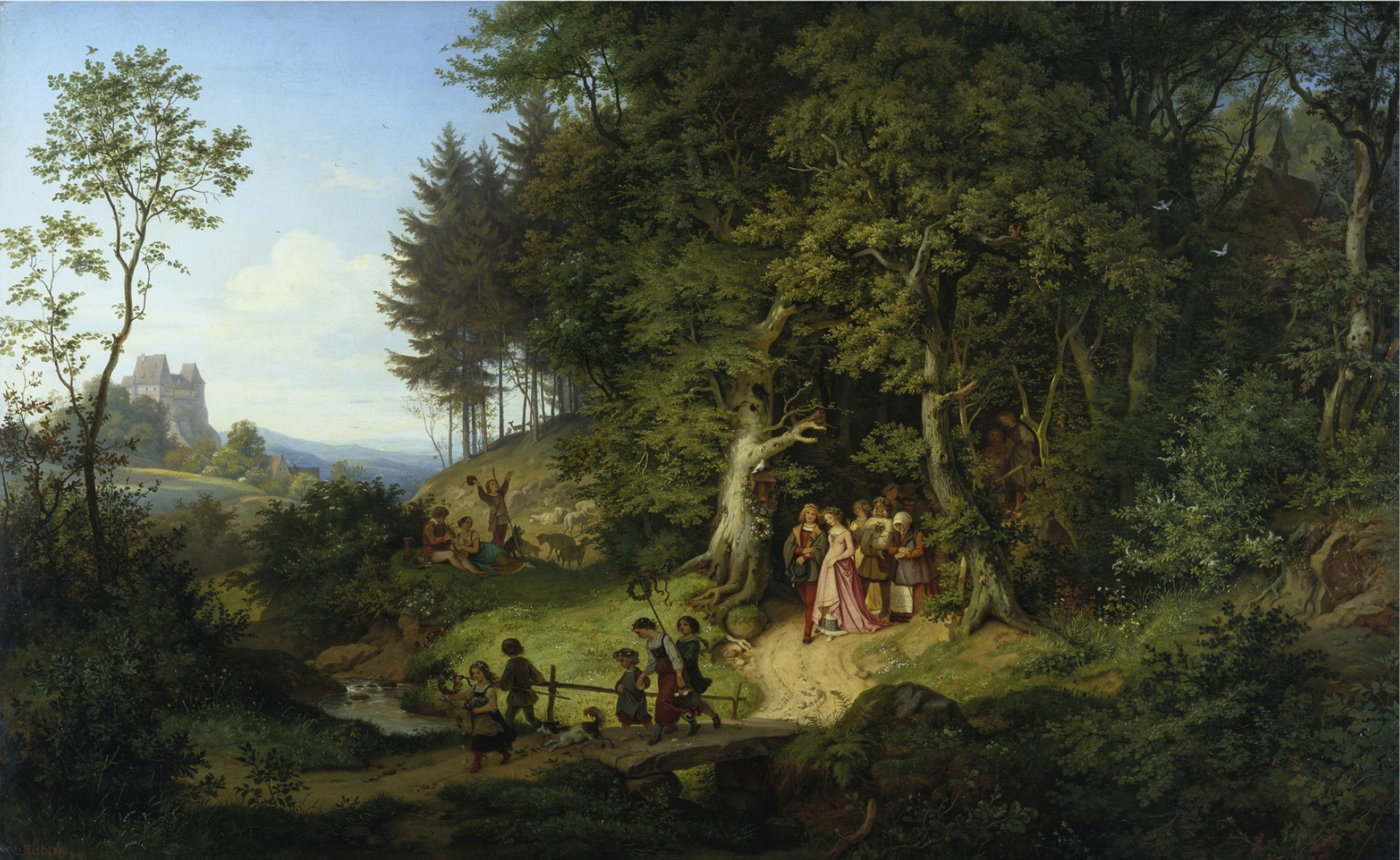
Ludwig Richter: Bridal Procession in a Spring Landscape, 1847

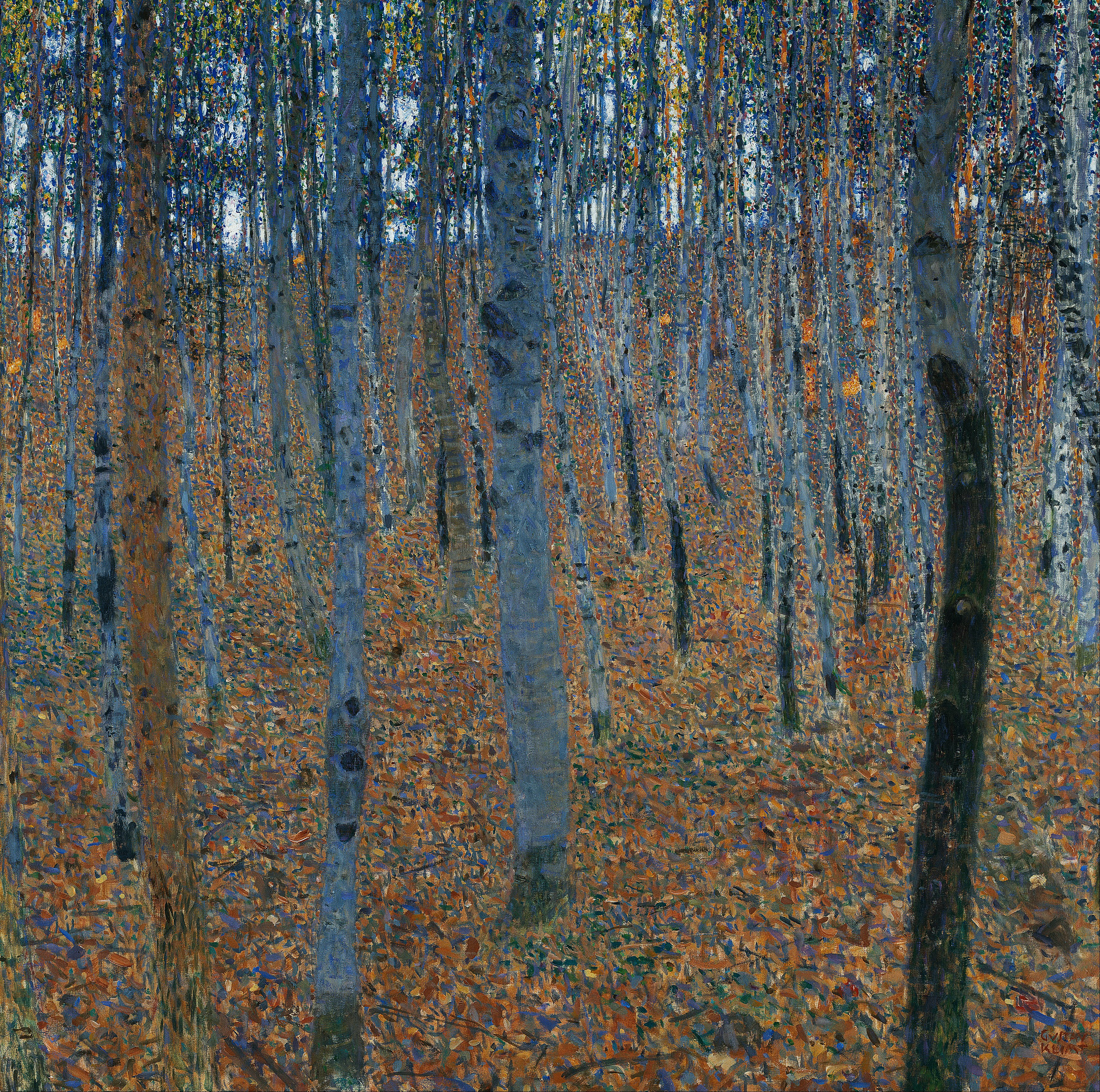
Gustav Klimt: Beech Grove I, 1902

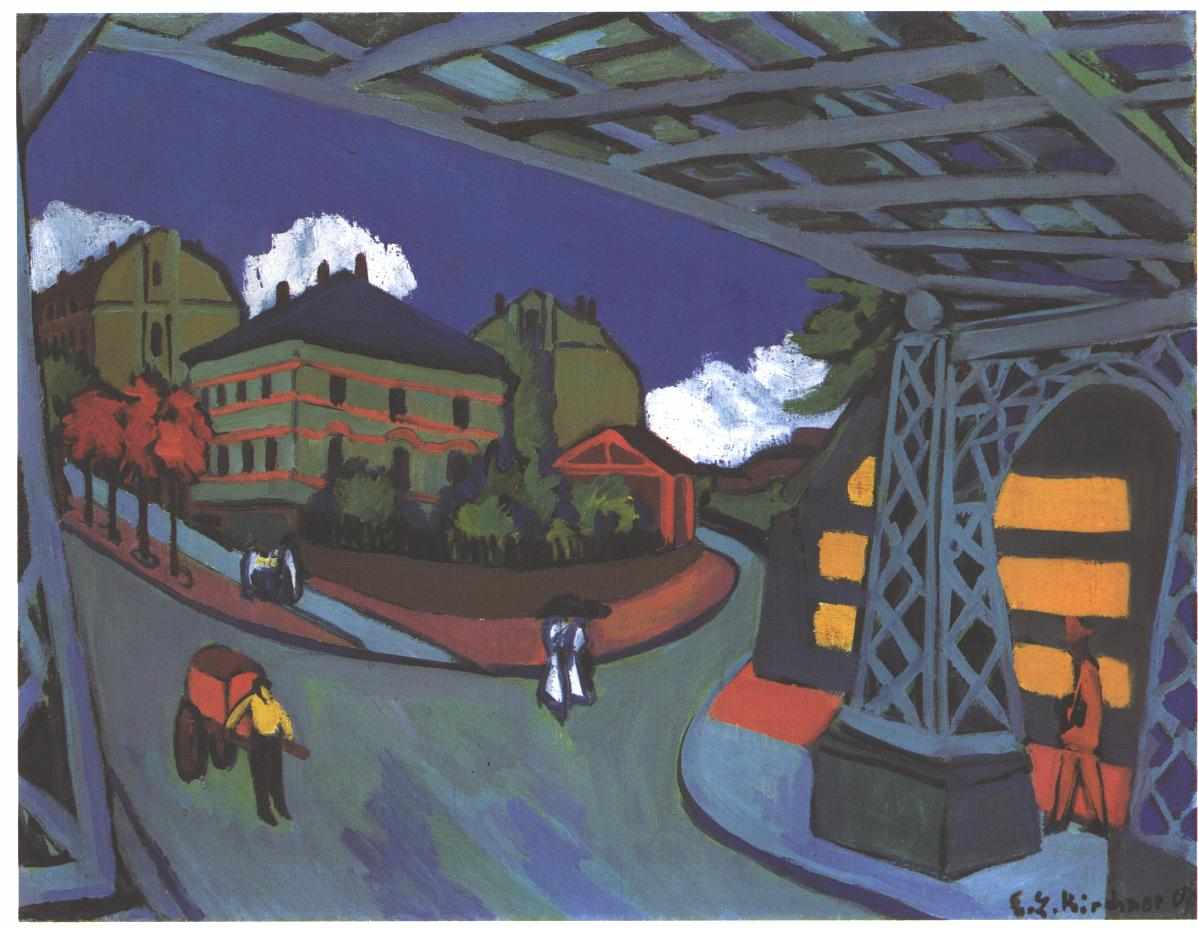
Ernst Ludwig Kirchner: Railway Underpass in Dresden

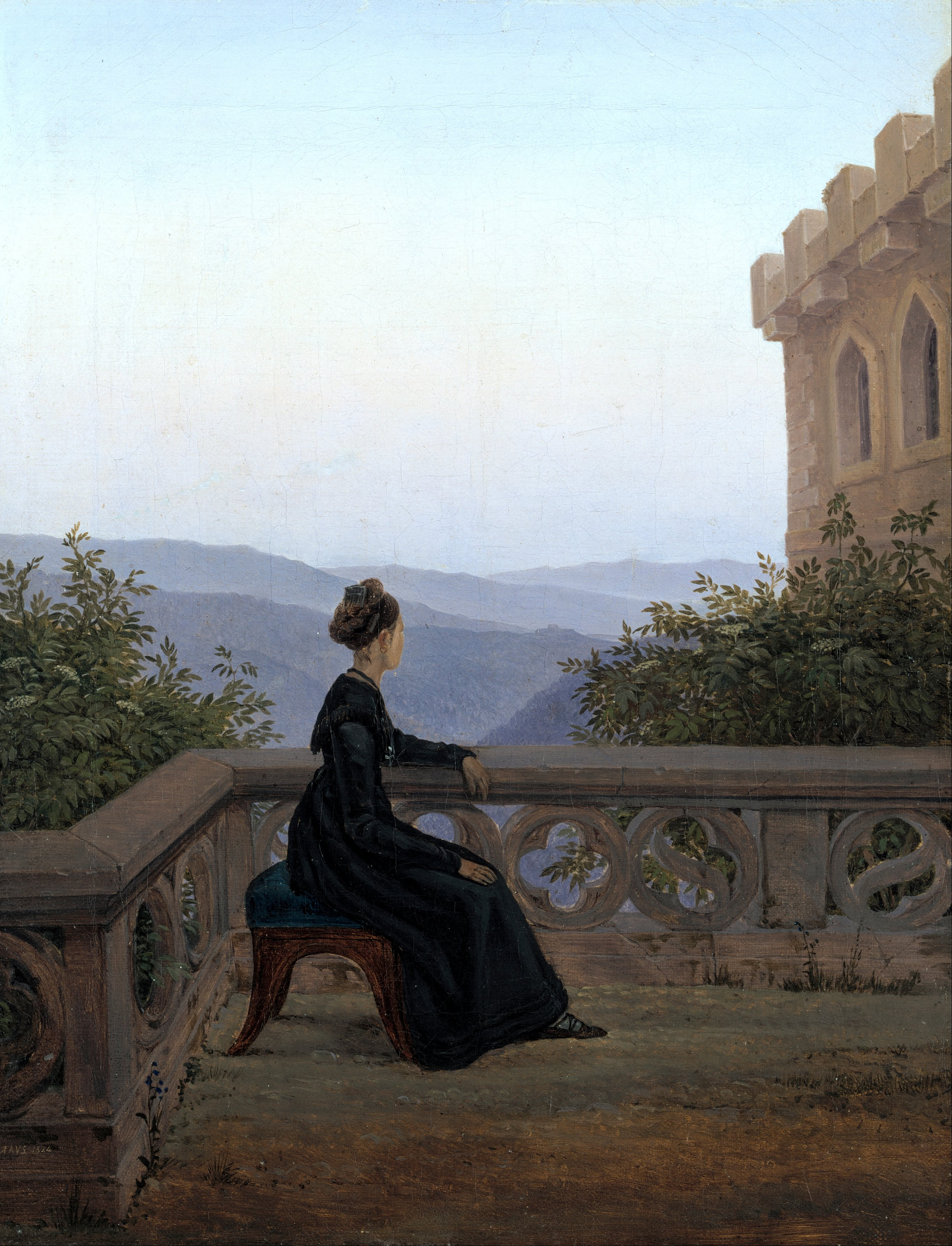
Carl Gustav Carus: - Woman on the Balcony, 1824

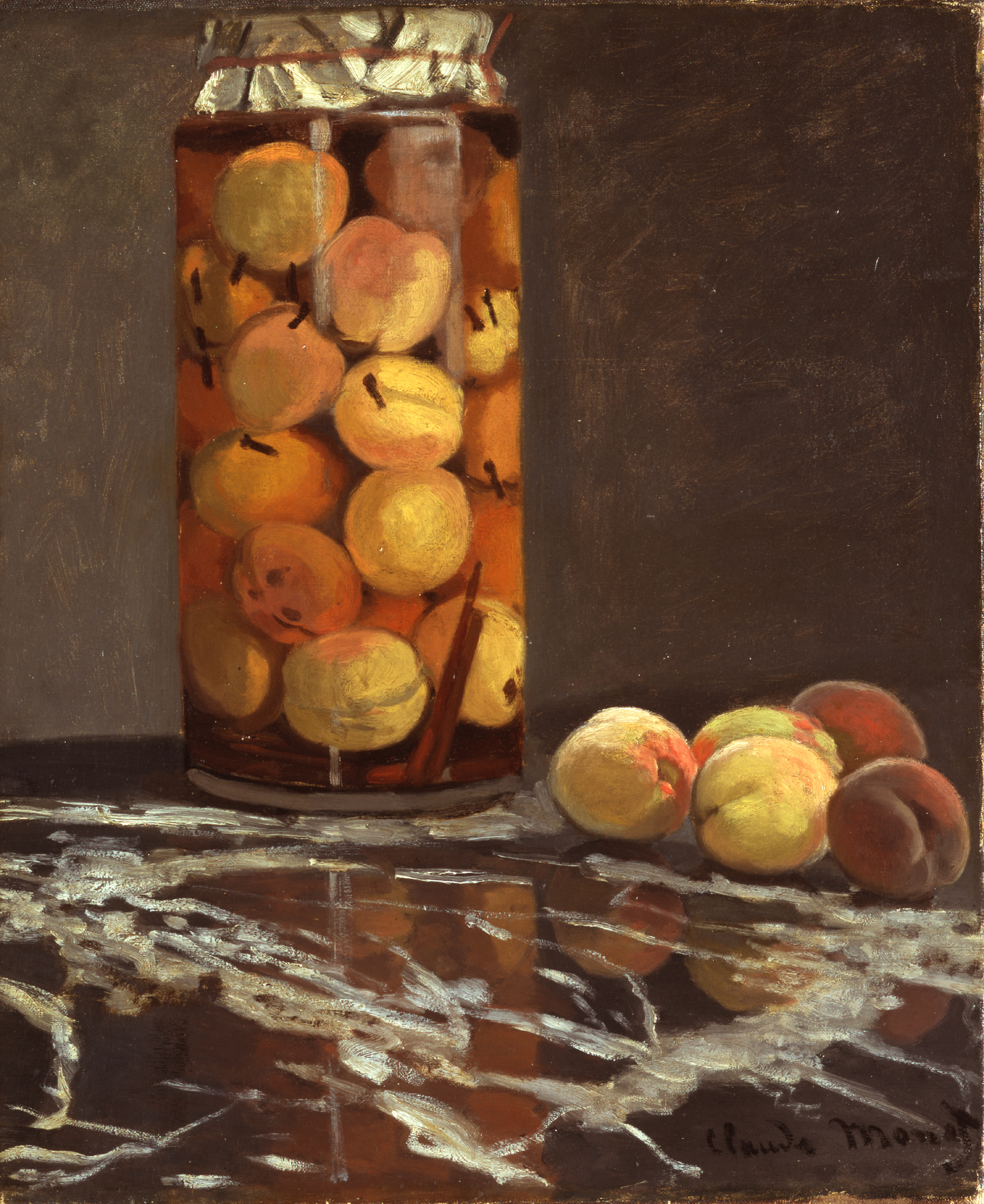
Claude Monet: A Jar Of Peaches, c. 1866

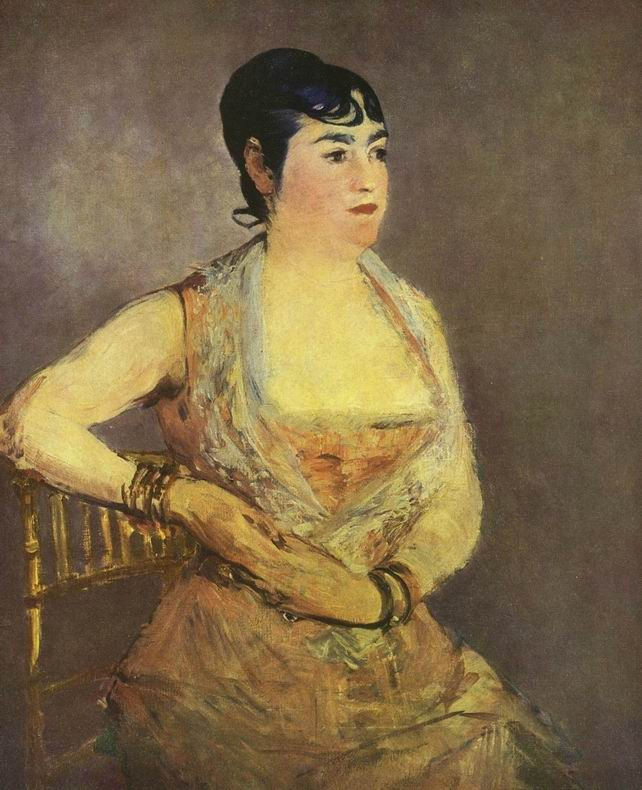
Édouard Manet: La dame en rose, Mme Martin, 1879

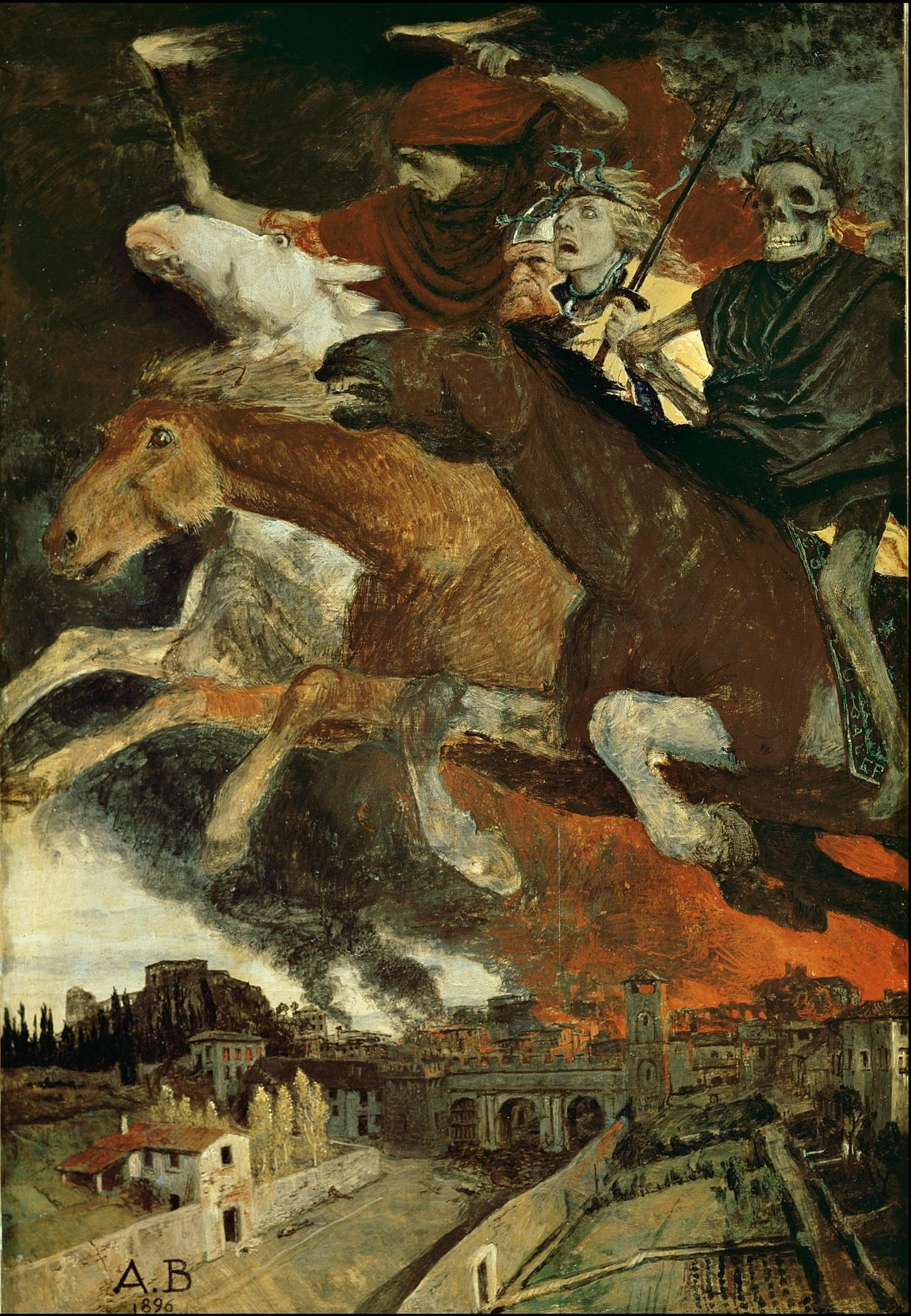
Arnold Böcklin: War, 1896

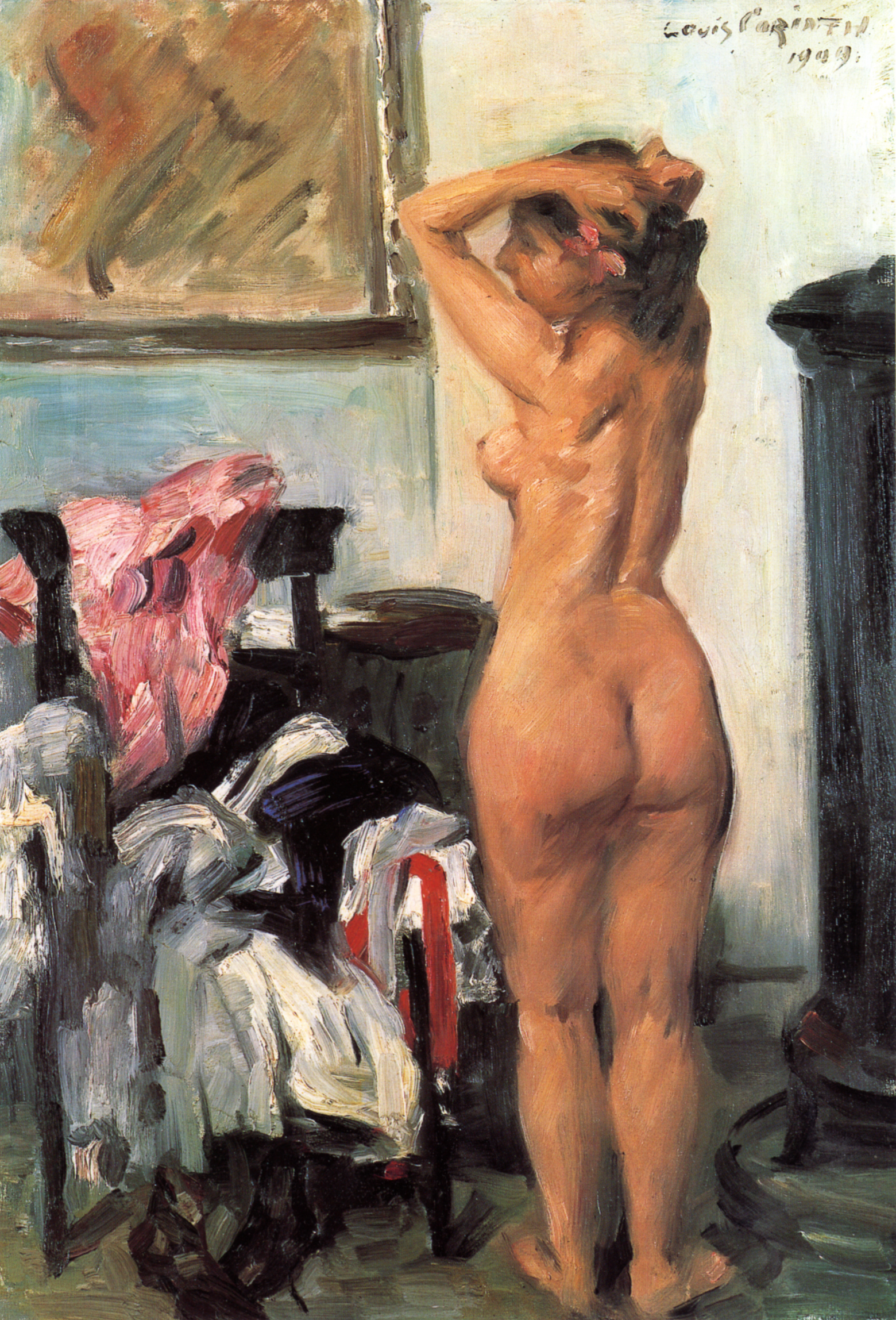
Lovis Corinth: Modellpause, 1909

== Other ==
The Society of Modern Art in Dresden (Gesellschaft für moderne Kunst in Dresden), founded in 1994, raises funds for the purchase of new works and organises permanent loans to the museum. Through its support, more than 30 works have been acquired and several exhibitions funded.

== See also ==
- List of museums in Saxony
