= Ships in Harbour, Evening =

Painting by Caspar David Friedrich

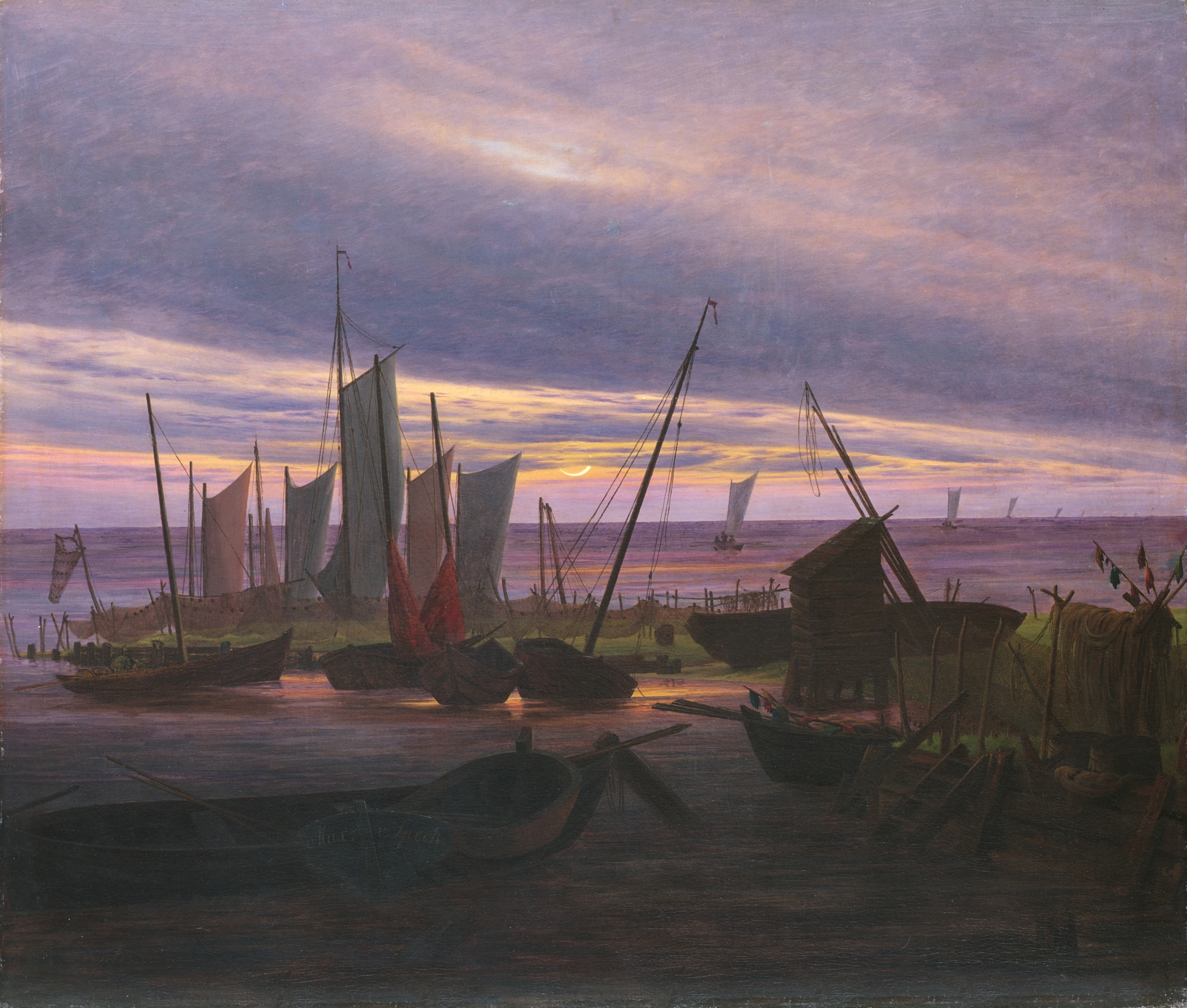
- Artist: Caspar David Friedrich
- Year: 1828
- Medium: oil on canvas
- Dimensions: 76.5 cm × 88 cm (30.1 in × 35 in)
- Location: Galerie Neue Meister, Dresden

Ships in Harbour, Evening (German - Schiffe im Hafen am Abend) is an 1828 oil on canvas painting by the German artist Caspar David Friedrich, now in the Galerie Neue Meister in Dresden.

== See also ==
- List of works by Caspar David Friedrich
