= Basilius von Ramdohr =

German conservative lawyer, art critic and journalist

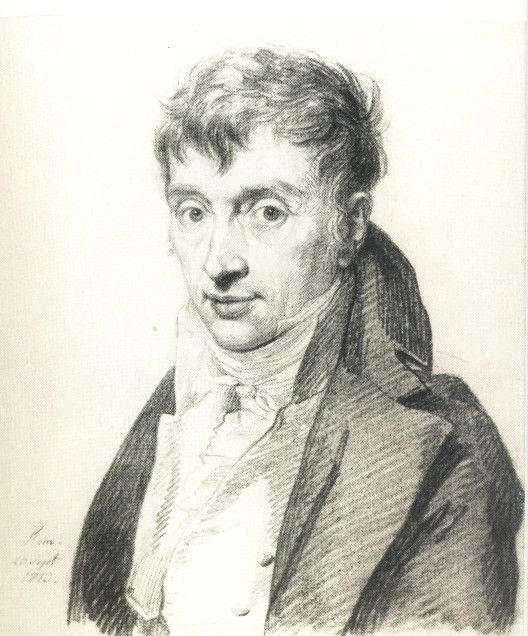
Basilius von Ramdohr, by Carl Christian Vogel von Vogelstein (1813)

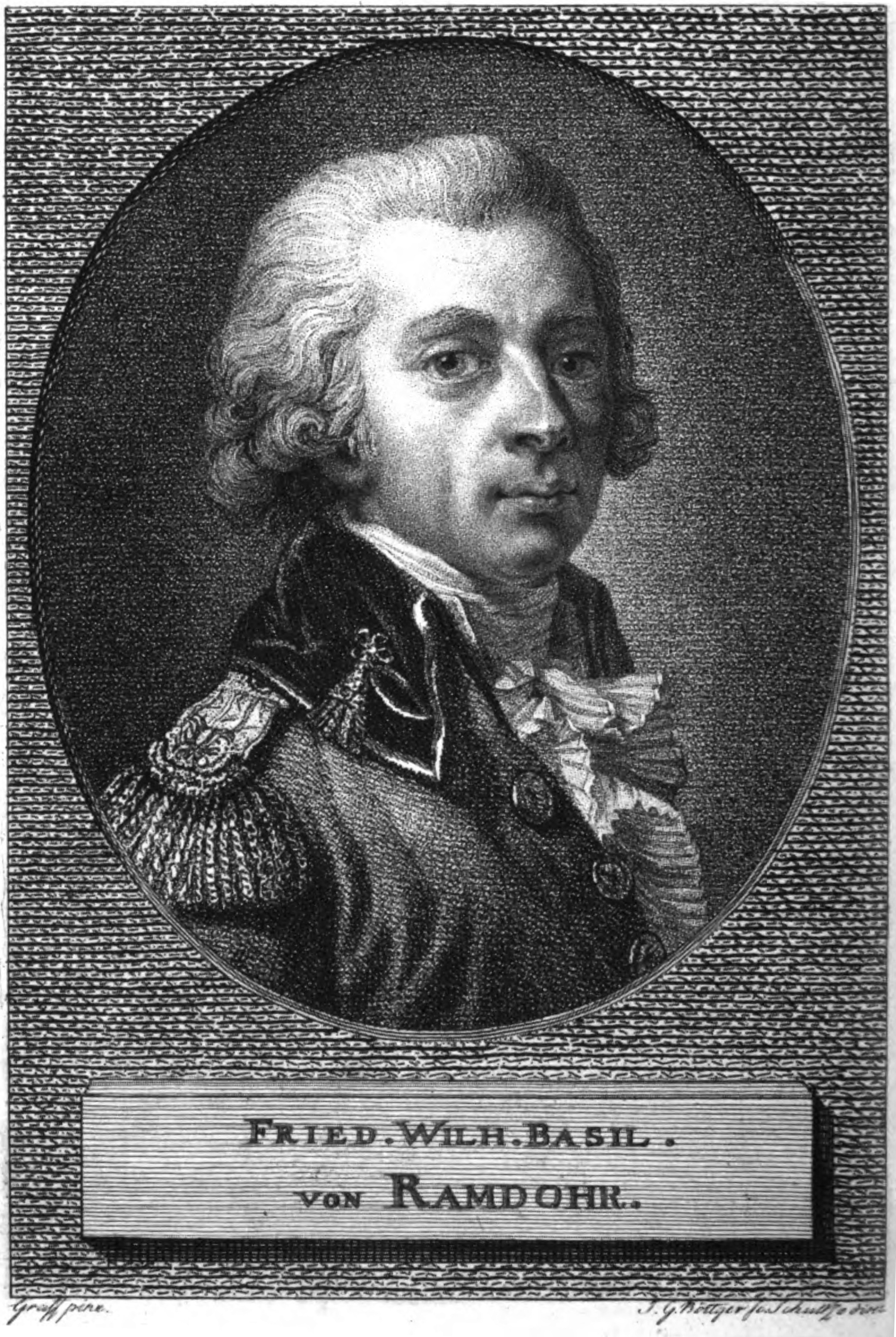
Ramdohr (1795)

Friedrich Wilhelm Basilius von Ramdohr (21 July 1757 – 26 July 1822) was a German conservative lawyer, art critic and journalist based in Dresden. From 1806 he was a Prussian diplomat to Rome and Naples.

== Life ==
Basilius von Ramdohr was born on the family estate, the Rittergut Drübber (near Nienburg), which was their property between 1686 and 1839. He studied law and aesthetics at the University of Göttingen, before commencing a long and glamorous career as an art-critic and diplomat.

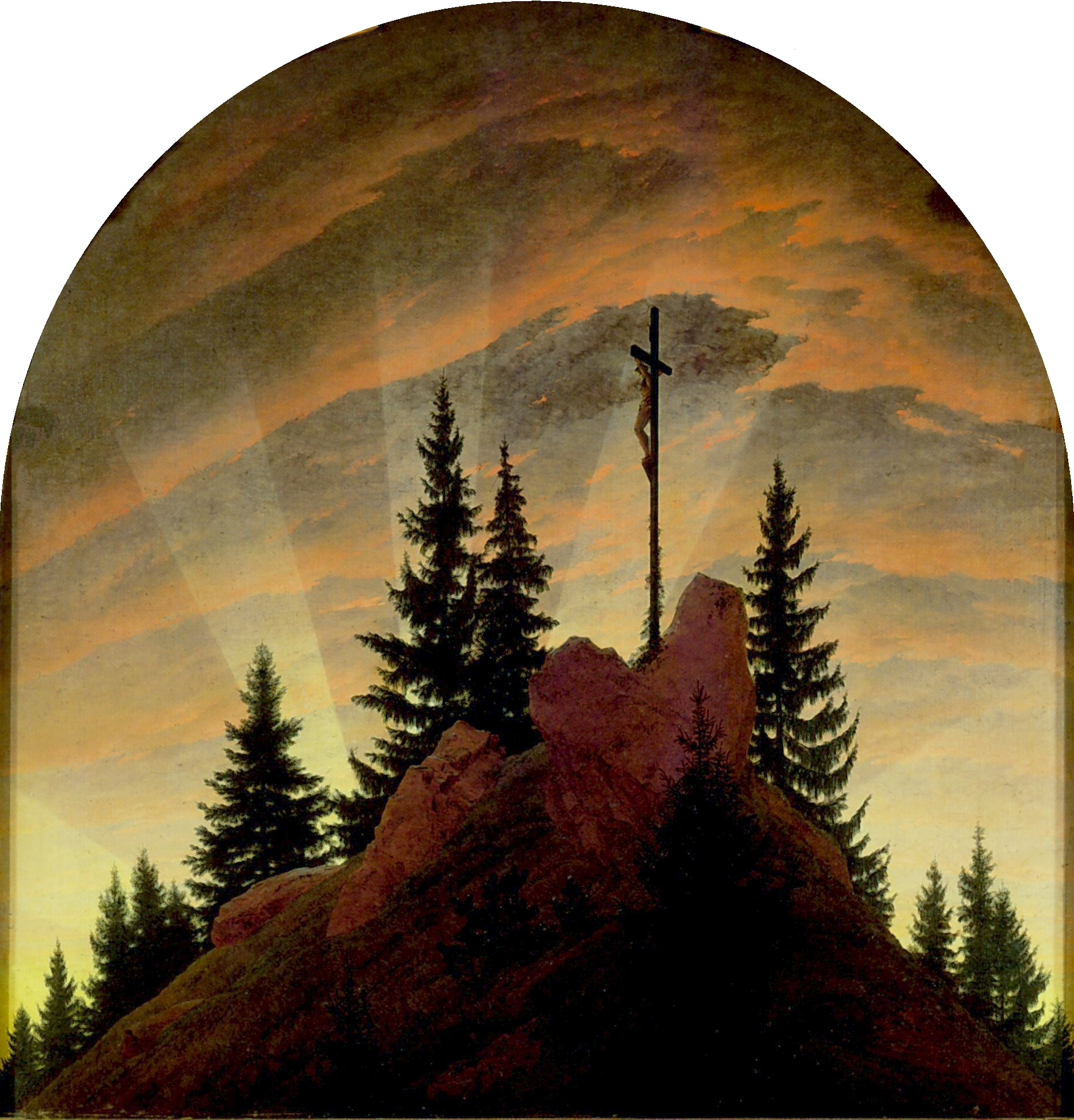
Cross in the Mountains (Tetschen Altar)

He is remembered partly for his book Venus Urania (1798), an early work on the psychology of love and friendship (the book's name denotes "celestial love"), but mostly for the so-called "Ramdohr Affair" of 1809 (Ramdohrstreit) concerning his attack on the painter Caspar David Friedrich. Although he had a high reputation during his lifetime, to many contemporaries like Goethe, Schiller, Schlegel and Lessing he was not to be taken seriously. In his early twenties he had a brief affair with Charlotte Kestner née Buff, the model for Lotte in The Sorrows of Young Werther. The girl who had rejected Goethe in 1772 found herself rejected by Ramdohr in 1781.

He died at Naples in 1822.

== Der Ramdohrstreit ==
In the 17–21 January 1809 edition of the Zeitung für die elegante Welt he published an article severely criticising Caspar David Friedrich's painting Cross in the Mountains (Tetschen Altar) (1808) and the school of German Romanticism to which it belonged. He was disturbed by the unacademic style of the painting, having little in common with the traditions established by Claude Lorrain and Jacob van Ruisdael, and deeply indignant that Friedrich should have presented it as an altarpiece to a private chapel. "Indeed it is a truly presumptuous thing, that Landscape Painting should try to slither into our churches and clamber onto our altars," he wrote. Ramdohr brooked no compromise in denying landscape self-sufficiency. To him, landscapes were formless compositions which could touch the viewer only superficially.

The public response to the article was unfavourable; nevertheless, Friedrich's supporters felt obliged to reformulate their positions more precisely. The debate about the relative merits of unmediated, spontaneous expression versus strict classical form (landscape painting representing the former) began in earnest at this time.

== Works ==
- Kaiser Otto der Dritte, ein Trauerspiel ("Otto III, a Tragedy", anonymous, 1783)
- Ueber Mahlerei und Bildhauerarbeit in Rom ("On Painting and Architecture in Rome", 3 volumes, 1787)
- Charis: Ueber das Schöne und die Schönheit in den nachbildenden Künsten ("Charis, or On the Beautiful and Beauty in the Imitative Arts", 2 volumes, 1793)
- Venus Urania: Ueber die Natur der Liebe, ueber ihre Veredlung und Verschönerung ("On the Nature of Love, its Ennoblement and Beautification", 4 volumes, 1798)
- Moralische Erzählungen ("Moral Tales", 2 volumes, 1799)

== Sources ==
- Hilmar, Frank (1997). "Der Ramdohrstreit". In Karl Möseneder (ed.). Streit um Bilder. Berlin: Reimer. ISBN 3-496-01169-6.
