= Johann Siegwald Dahl =

German animal painter

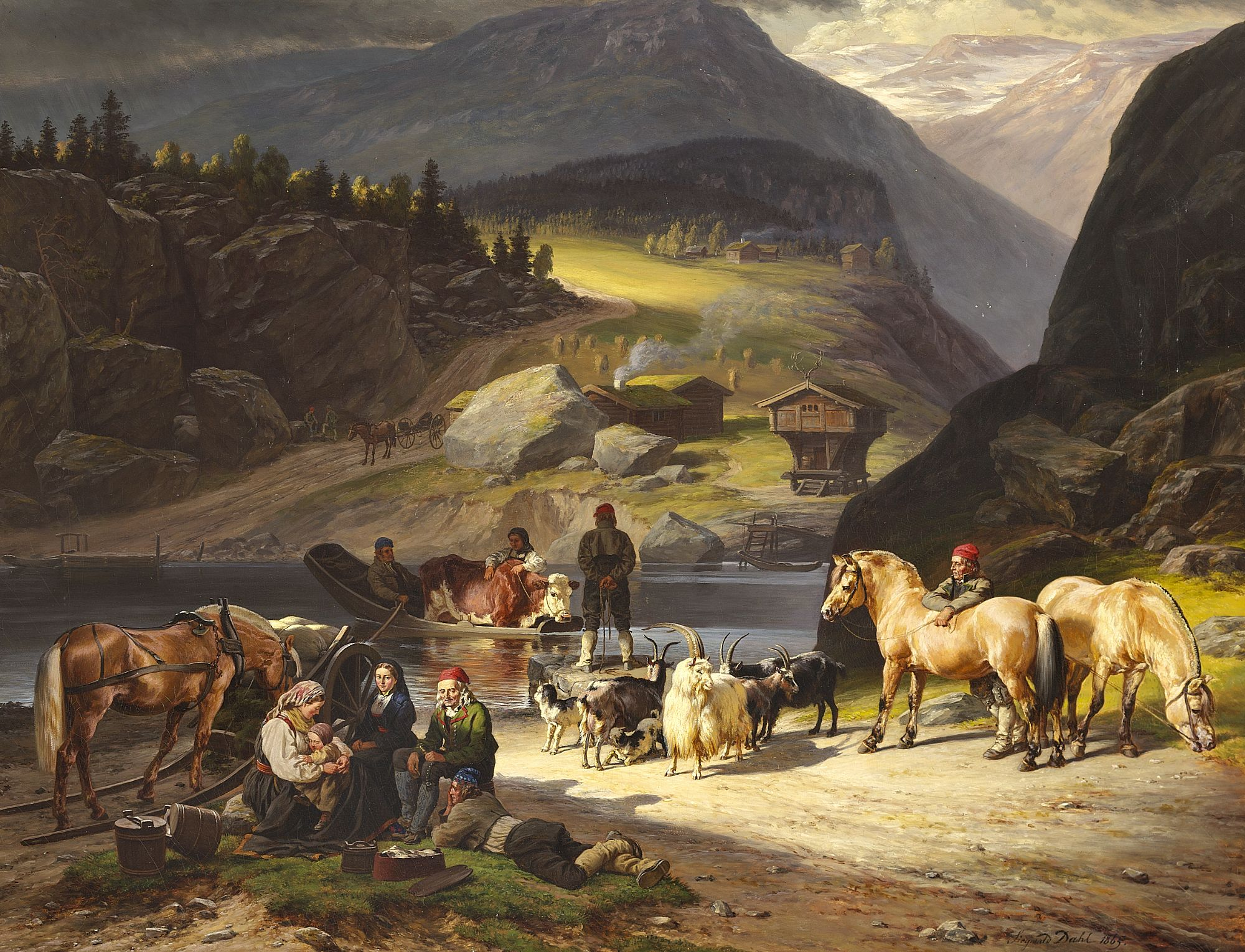
Scene from Telemarken in Norway, 1865

Johann Siegwald Dahl (16 August 1827 – 15 June 1902) was a German animal painter.

== Life and work ==
A native of Dresden, he was one of nine children born to the Norwegian painter, Johan Christian Dahl and his first wife Emilie. Of those, only he and one sister survived to adulthood. His first art lessons came from his father. Later, he studied animal painting with Johann Friedrich Wilhelm Wegener.

After three more years attending the Dresden Academy of Fine Arts, he paid a visit to London to study with Edwin Landseer; another famous animal painter. He also spent some time in Paris. Upon his father's death in 1857, he donated a collection of his studies and drawings to the National Gallery in Oslo and the Bergen Billedgalleri. He became an honorary member of the Gemäldegalerie Alte Meister in 1864.

His best known works involve Norwegian motifs, inspired by his father's works and numerous visits to Norway, but he also created some portraits. His works may be seen at several museums in Dresden and Hanover. He died in 1902 in Dresden.

His sister Caroline was married to the Norwegian cabinet minister, Anders Sandøe Ørsted Bull.

== Sources ==
- Meyers Konversations-Lexikon, 4th edition, 1888–1890
- Biography from Salmonsens konversationsleksikon @ Projekt Runeberg
