= Cross in the Mountains =

Painting by Caspar David Friedrich

- Tetschen Altar (German)
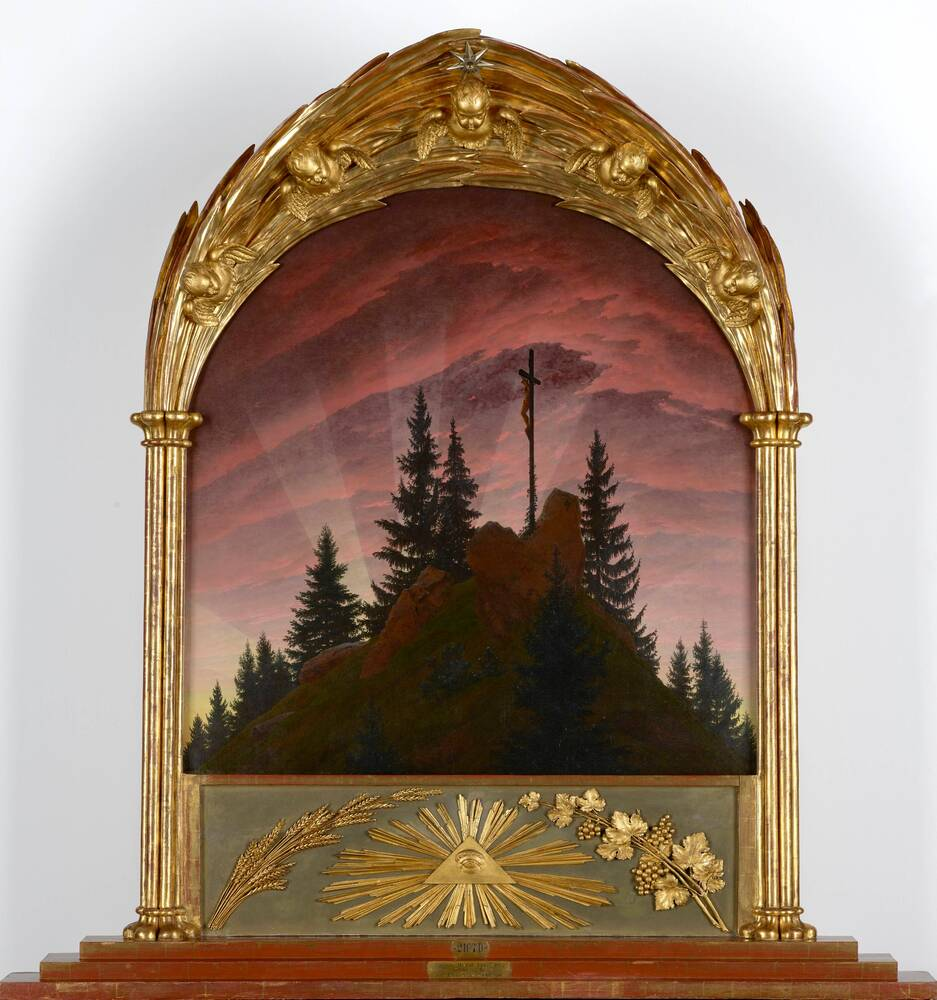
- Frame by Kühn after Friedrich's design.
- Artist: Caspar David Friedrich
- Year: 1808
- Medium: Oil on canvas
- Dimensions: 115 cm × 110 cm (45 in × 43 in)
- Location: Galerie Neue Meister, Dresden

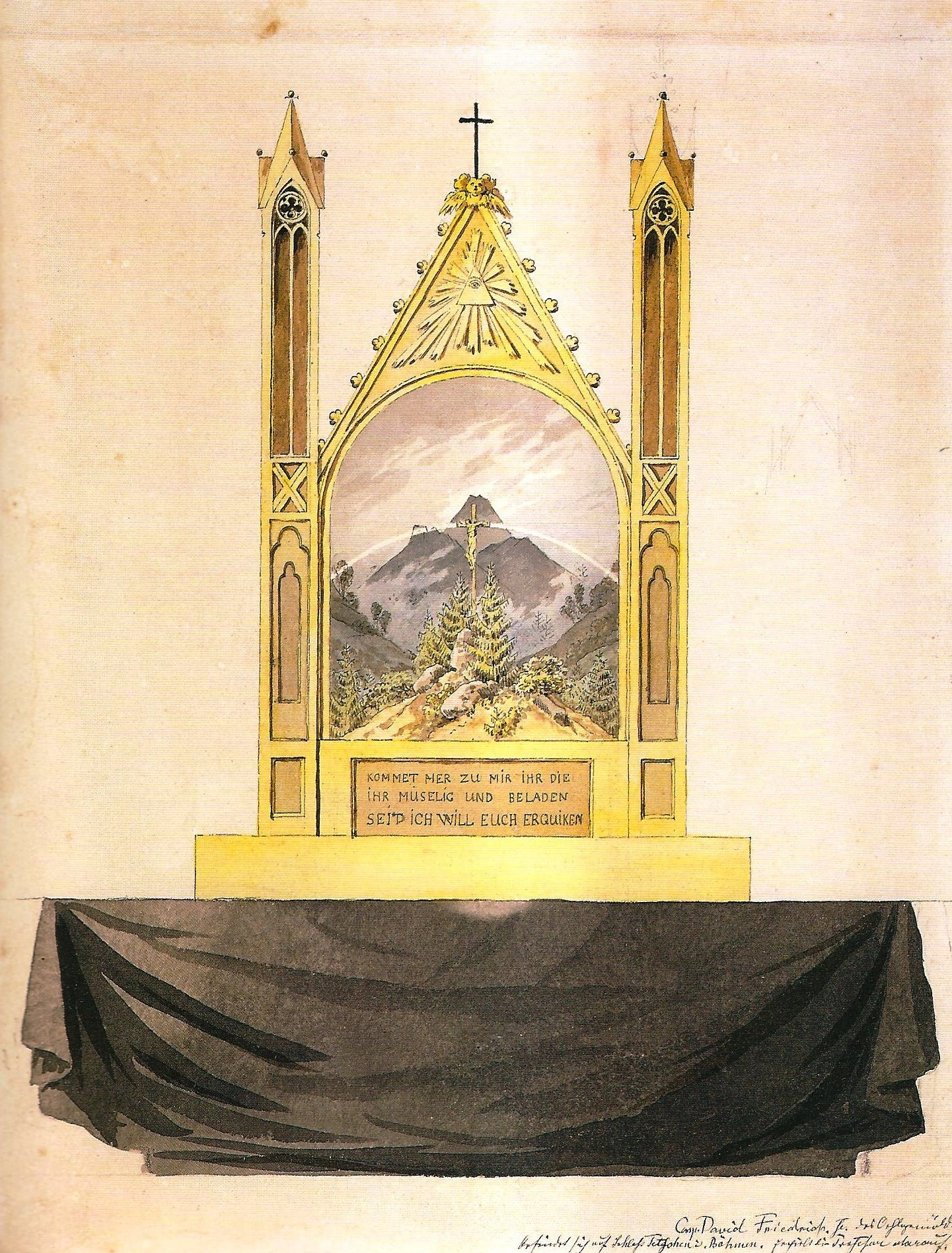
Friedrich's 1807 design for the altarpiece. Kupferstichkabinett, Dresden.

Cross in the Mountains, also known as the Tetschen Altar, is an oil painting by the German artist Caspar David Friedrich designed as an altarpiece. Among Friedrich's first major works, the 1808 painting marked an important break with the conventions of landscape painting by including Christian iconography. In the hierarchy of genres, religious (history) painting was considered the highest genre of art; Friedrich's use of landscape to evoke a spiritual message was thus controversial, causing debate between proponents of neoclassical ideals and the new German Romanticism of Friedrich and his peers.

== Description ==
The canvas depicts a golden summit cross with the crucified Jesus silhouetted in lost profile on a rock atop a mountain, surrounded by fir trees below. The cross, facing toward the sun, reaches the highest point in the picture but is presented obliquely and from a distance. The pictorial space seems almost two-dimensional from afar, and by casting the foreground elements in darkness, the scene feels distant from the viewer and at a great height. Because the light shines behind the summit the part of the mountain that we see stand in shadow. The low sun may be rising or setting; its five stylized rays travel upward, and one creates a gleam on Christ, suggesting a metal sculpture. Ivy grows at the base of the cross. According to Siegel, the design of the altarpiece is the "logical climax of many earlier drawings of [Friedrich's] which depicted a cross in nature's world" (see Gallery).

The canvas departs from a naturalistic landscape in a number of ways, all flagged by its earliest critics writing at the time. The handling of suns rays is not realistic; art historian Linda Siegel suggests that the sun is not the only source of light—that a mystical source of illumination must also be present. The viewer's location is unclear, seemingly at a great height, and wherever it is, the detail of the landscape would not be as visible as Friedrich makes it. An exhibition catalogue noted the formal innovations of Friedrich's landscapes: an "unwillingness to construct a continuous space from interconnected layers [and] the absence of a unifying tonality in his use of color".

The landscape shows great attention to detail in the representation of nature. Friedrich made a number of studies of trees and rocks that can be located in this painting. Friedrich's contemporary critic Ramdohr noted the influence of Albrecht Dürer and other masters in the precision of the depiction: "every little twig, every needle on the firs, every spot on the cliff is expressed... the outer silhouette is completely exact"—but this was a criticism, given the viewer's distant location: "in order to see the mountain simultaneously with the sky in this relation, [Friedrich] would have had to stand several thousand paces away, on the same level with the mountain and in such a way that the line of the horizon parallels the mountain. From such a distance he would not have been able to see any detail."

The gilded frame, designed by Friedrich and formed by the sculptor Christian Gottlieb Kühn, includes other Christian iconography. At the base, the Eye of God is within a triangle with wheat and a vine, symbols of the Eucharist. Travelling up the frame, Gothic columns support palm branches from which five angels emerge, with a star above the central one. The design, in recalling sacred art of much earlier periods, solidified the painting's function as an altarpiece and gave contemporary viewers "an allegorical directive for reading the painting scene thus enclosed", although any allegorical reading would have been debatable given the unique combination of genres.

== Commission ==
The genesis of Friedrich's altarpiece is complex. For decades, art historians accepted the account of Friedrich's close friend, August Otto Rühle von Lilienstern, until new evidence arose. By Lilienstern's account, the altar was commissioned by the Countess Theresia von Thun-Hohenstein for her Catholic family's chapel in Tetschen, Bohemia. She had seen a similar sepia work by Friedrich and was enamored of it. The painter was at first resistant to accepting the commission, tending to paint only when the inspiration struck him, but he agreed when he found a design for an overall altarpiece that he thought would be in harmony with the chapel setting. Research in 1977, however, found that Friedrich had conceived the painting before the commission, and that he intended to dedicate it to King Gustav IV Adolf of Sweden (which became moot when the king was deposed by the end of 1808). The Thun-Hohensteins became aware of these details by August 1808. The countess's mother objected to both the price and the format of the artwork, stating that it would never be used in the family's chapel or elsewhere in the castle. They did eventually purchase it, but it was hung in the bedroom of the countess. Friedrich wanted to visit the family to see his altarpiece in situ, not being aware of its actual location. His patrons discouraged him by lying about their plans for the painting's location or its current whereabouts. Nevertheless, the Tetschen Castle was home to the altarpiece from 1809 to 1921.

Friedrich's desire to dedicate the painting to Gustav IV Adolf of Sweden complicates not only the story of the commission, but the painting's interpretation. Friedrich was from the town of Greifswald, an area that at times had been under Swedish rule since the Peace of Westphalia in 1648, ending with Napoleon's invasion in 1806. For an anti-French, German patriot like Friedrich, Napoleon's invasion stoked feelings of German and Romantic nationalism. Gustav IV Adolf confirmed his recognition of Germany in declaring, "May I yet see the day when I behold Germany, as my second fatherland, restored to the standing to which its estimable nation and the fame of centuries give it undeniable right". The king was also a pious man influenced by the Moravian Church, a Protestant denomination that sought a "radically inward devotion ... faith was 'not in thoughts nor in the head, but in the heart, a light illuminated in the heart'". Friedrich's painting reflected this sentiment, and it contains what can be interpreted as one of Gustav IV's symbols, the midnight sun. According to Norbert Wolf, the Tetschen Altar was "thus first and foremost not an altarpiece but a piece of political propaganda... [taking] up the liberation ideology of the Swedish monarchy". Koerner and Wolf assert that when the political allegory was no longer available to Friedrich, the interpretation of the picture could shift easily from a political to a more purely religious one, in line with the ideals of German Romanticism. Friedrich continued to use German-nationalist themes in his paintings throughout his career.

== Exhibition and contemporary reception ==
On Christmas Day of 1808, Friedrich, responding to his friends' interest in the painting, exhibited the work in his studio. The artist was reluctant to do so, given that the altarpiece was designed with a specific location, the Tetschen chapel, in mind. The altar was never meant to be hung from a wall, but placed on a table as in Friedrich's design drawing. Friedrich therefore tried to recreate the conditions of a chapel in his studio: he lowered the lighting and placed the piece on a table covered with black cloth. Lilienstern, who was present, documented the event and concluded: "Torn from [the chapel] context and placed in a room not adapted for such a display, the picture would lose a large part of its intended effect."

Although it was controversial and generally coldly received, it was nevertheless Friedrich's first painting to receive wide publicity. The artist's friends publicly defended the work, while art critic Basilius von Ramdohr, who had attended Friedrich's studio exhibit, published an article rejecting Friedrich's use of landscape in a religious context. Ramdohr asked if Cross in the Mountains succeeded as a landscape painting; if allegory was suitable in landscape painting; and if the work's "ambition to serve as an altarpiece for Christian worship [was] compatible with the true nature of art and religion". His answer was always no: "It is true presumption when landscape painting wants to slink into the church and creep on to the altars". Ramdohr was also early in identifying the "Germanness" of the painting, and the element of nationalism. Siegel argued that Ramdohr, a classicist, did not understand the philosophy of the new German Romantic artists, who felt that "traditional religious iconography could not allow man to experience a mystical union with God". However, many Romantics, including Friedrich Schleiermacher, insisted that traditional Christian symbols and artifacts like wayside crosses were ways back to religion.

The debate about the painting, termed the Ramdohrstreit and carried on mostly in the journal Zeitung für die elegante Welt (Journal for the Elegant World), morphed into one about the challenge to Enlightenment aesthetics posed by the burgeoning Romanticism. Koerner considers Friedrich's supporters to have failed in rebutting Ramdohr's specific criticisms, but their agenda was just as much to present a new way to understand and evaluate art. The art historian concludes, "Just as Cross in the Mountains constitutes a revolution in landscape painting, its Romantic defense signals a revolution in the language and practice of art criticism".

Gerhard von Kügelgen and other artists responded to Ramdohr in defense of Friedrich. Kügelgen objected to Ramdohr's desire to adhere to formalized aesthetic principles, arguing that the art of the future could not be limited by ideals developed out of the past: "Throughout art history we observe art consent to varied forms, and who among us wants and is able to determine that it might not agree to forms not yet known. Friedrich's originality should be all the more welcome to us, since it presents us with a form of landscape painting previously less noticed, in which, within its very peculiarity, is revealed a spirited striving after truth."

Friedrich responded to criticisms with a programme describing his intentions, marking the only time that he publicly offered commentary on his art. He wrote:

"Jesus Christ, nailed to the Cross, is turned to the setting sun, here the image of the totally enlivening Father. With Christ dies the wisdom of the old world, the time when God the Father wandered directly on Earth. This sun set and the world was no longer able to apprehend the departed light. The evening glow shining from the pure noble metal of the golden crucified Christ is reflected in gentle glow to the earth. The Cross stands raised on a rock, unshakably firm, as our faith in Jesus Christ. Around the Cross stand the evergreens, enduring through all seasons, as does the belief of Man in Him, the crucified."

== Gallery ==
=== Antecedents and studies ===
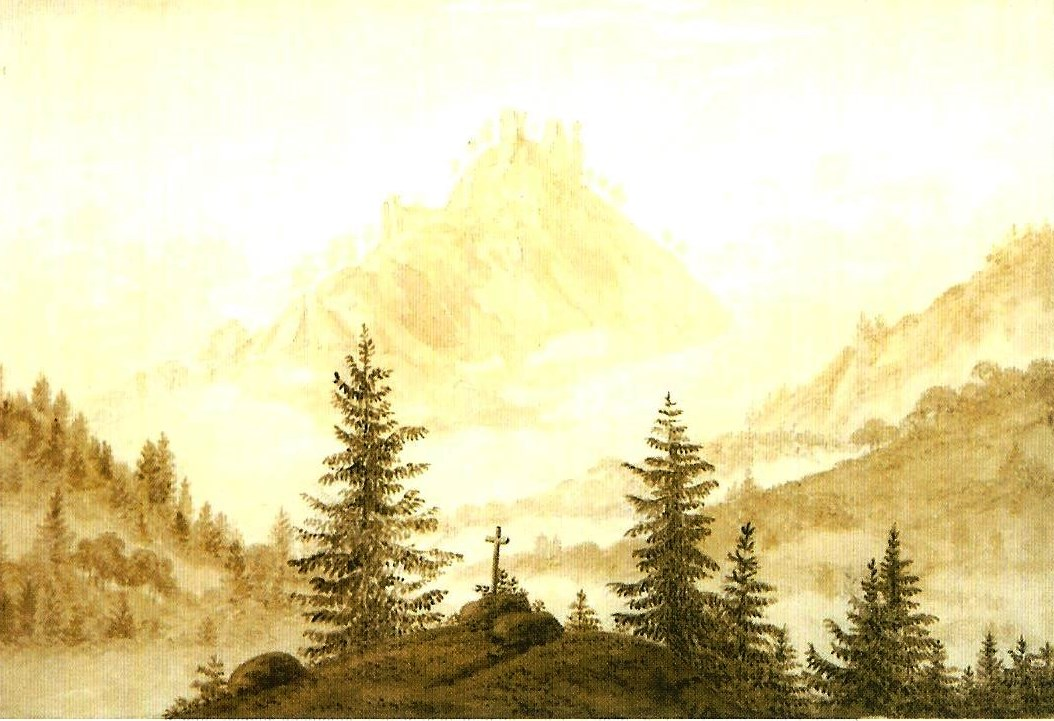
Gebirgslandschaft, 1804/05. Earlier setting of the cross in a landscape.

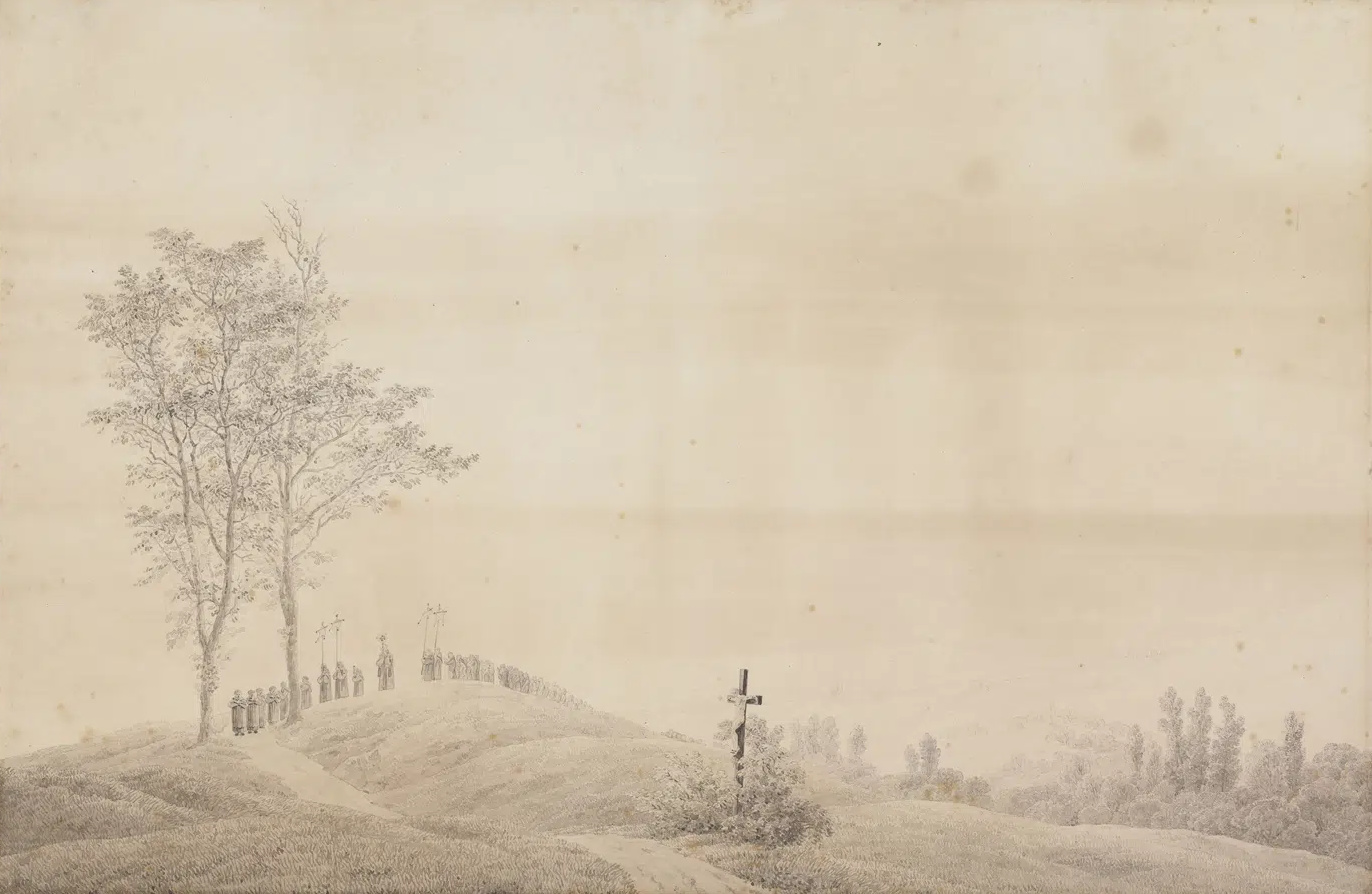
Wallfahrt bei Sonnenuntergang, c. 1805. Earlier setting.

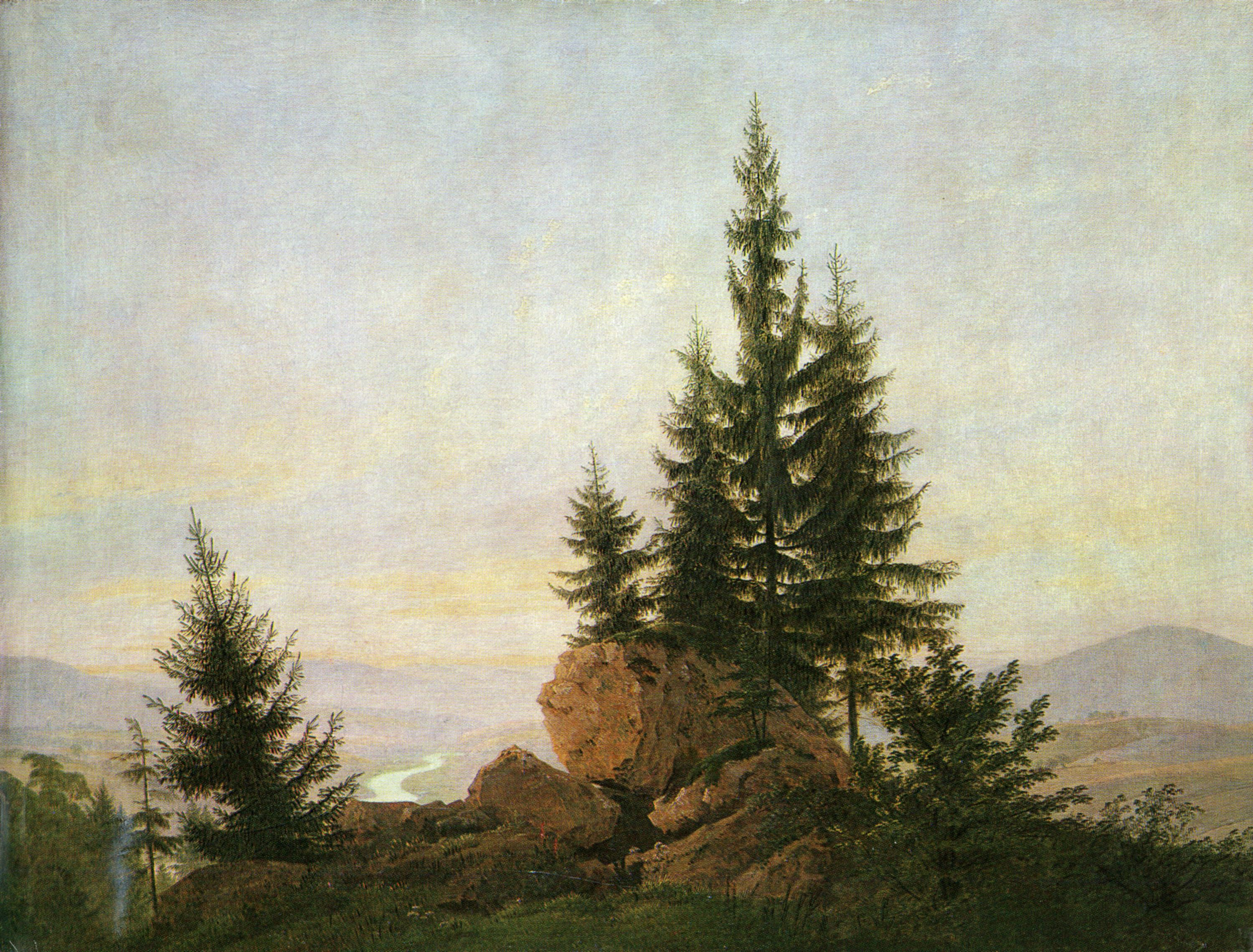
View of the Elbe Valley, 1807. Earlier setting.

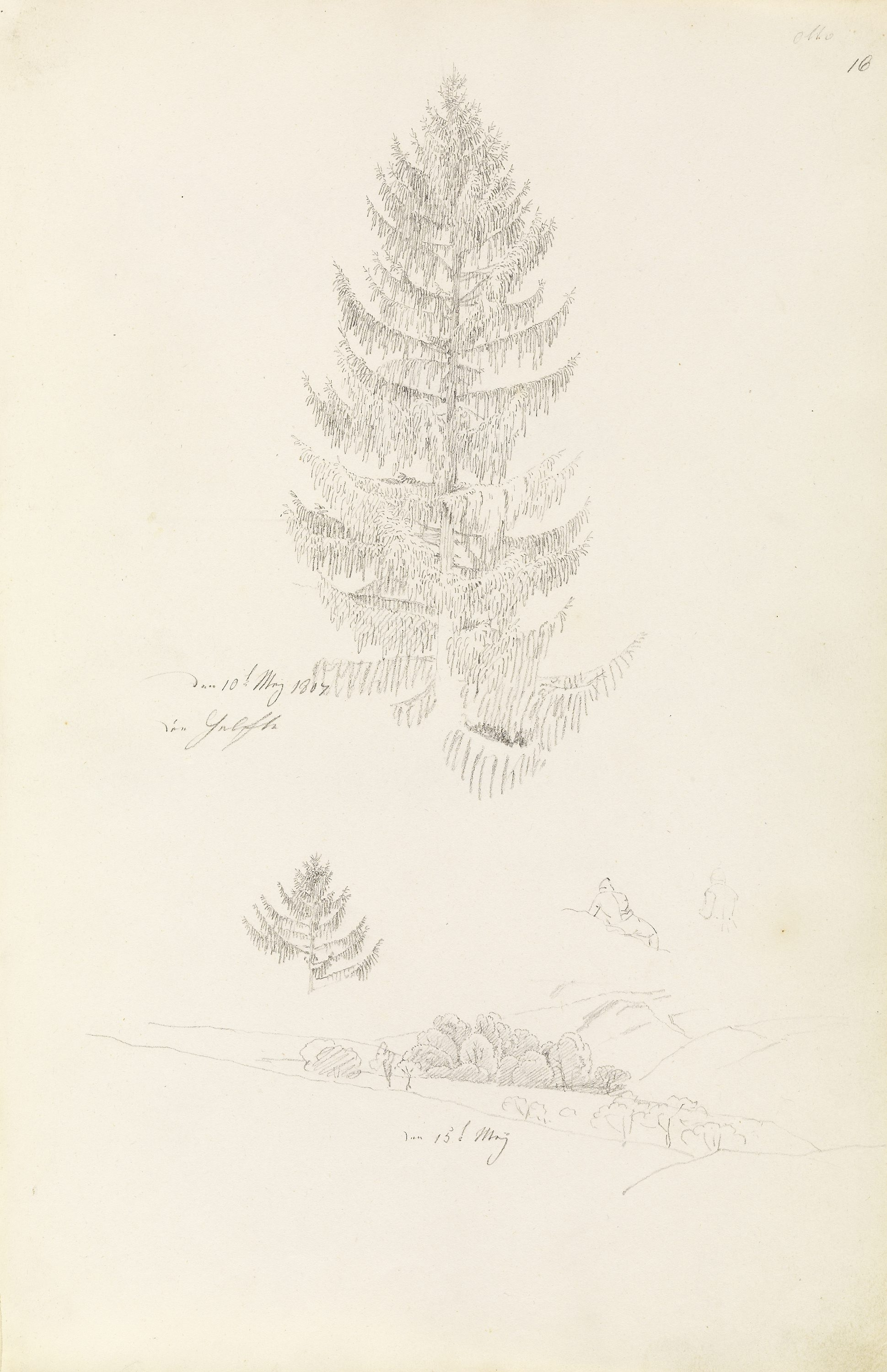
The painting uses this 1807 study of a tree

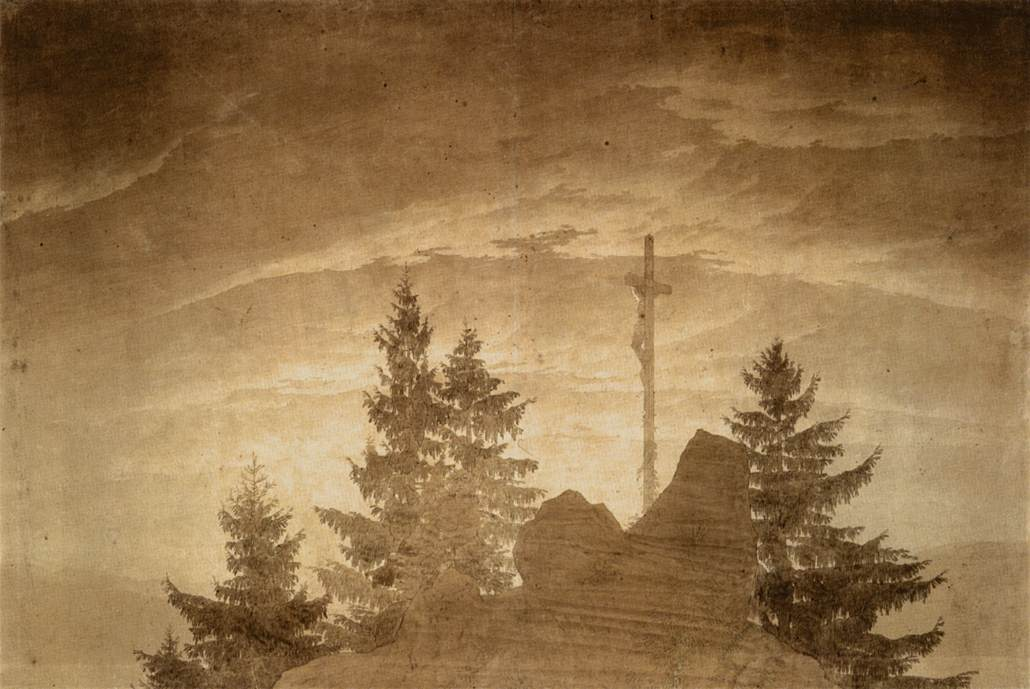
This pencil and sepia (c. 1805/06) had been shown in an 1807 Dresden Academy exhibition (Koerner claimed the exhibited item is lost, but Wolf pictures it)

=== Related later works ===
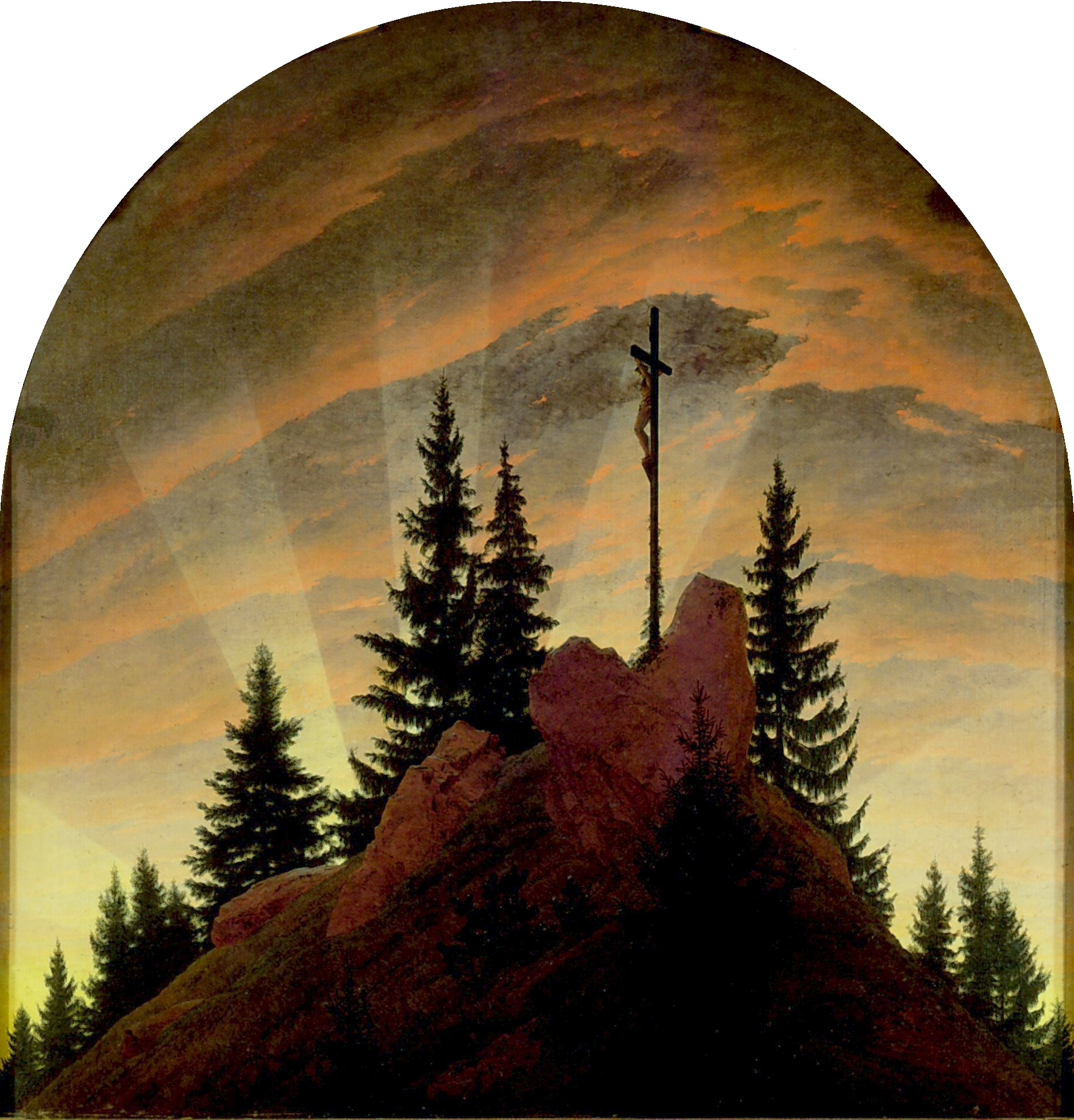
The present altarpiece without a frame

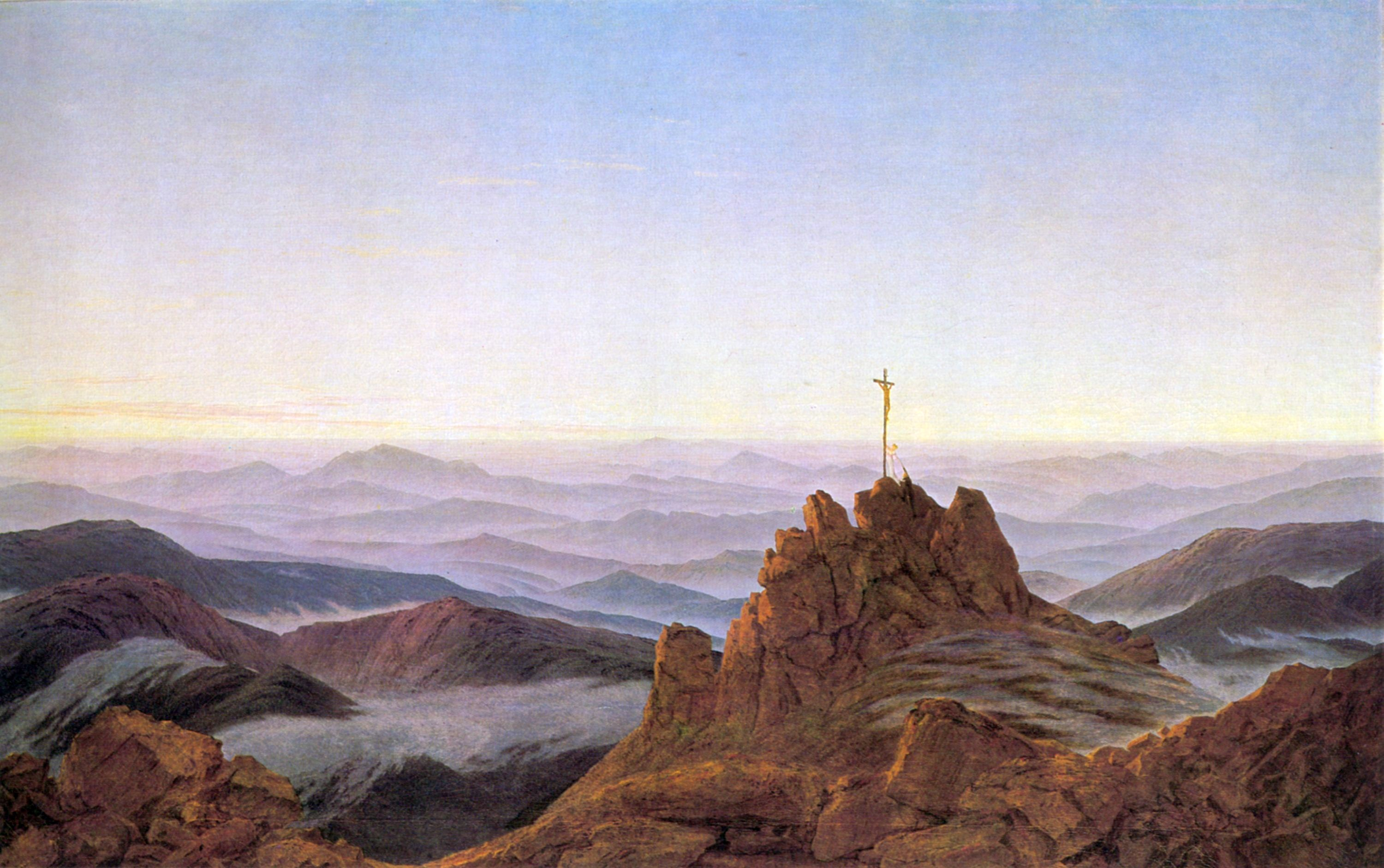
Morning in the Riesengebirge (1811). Friedrich situated the cross in other paintings made soon after the Tetschen Altar.

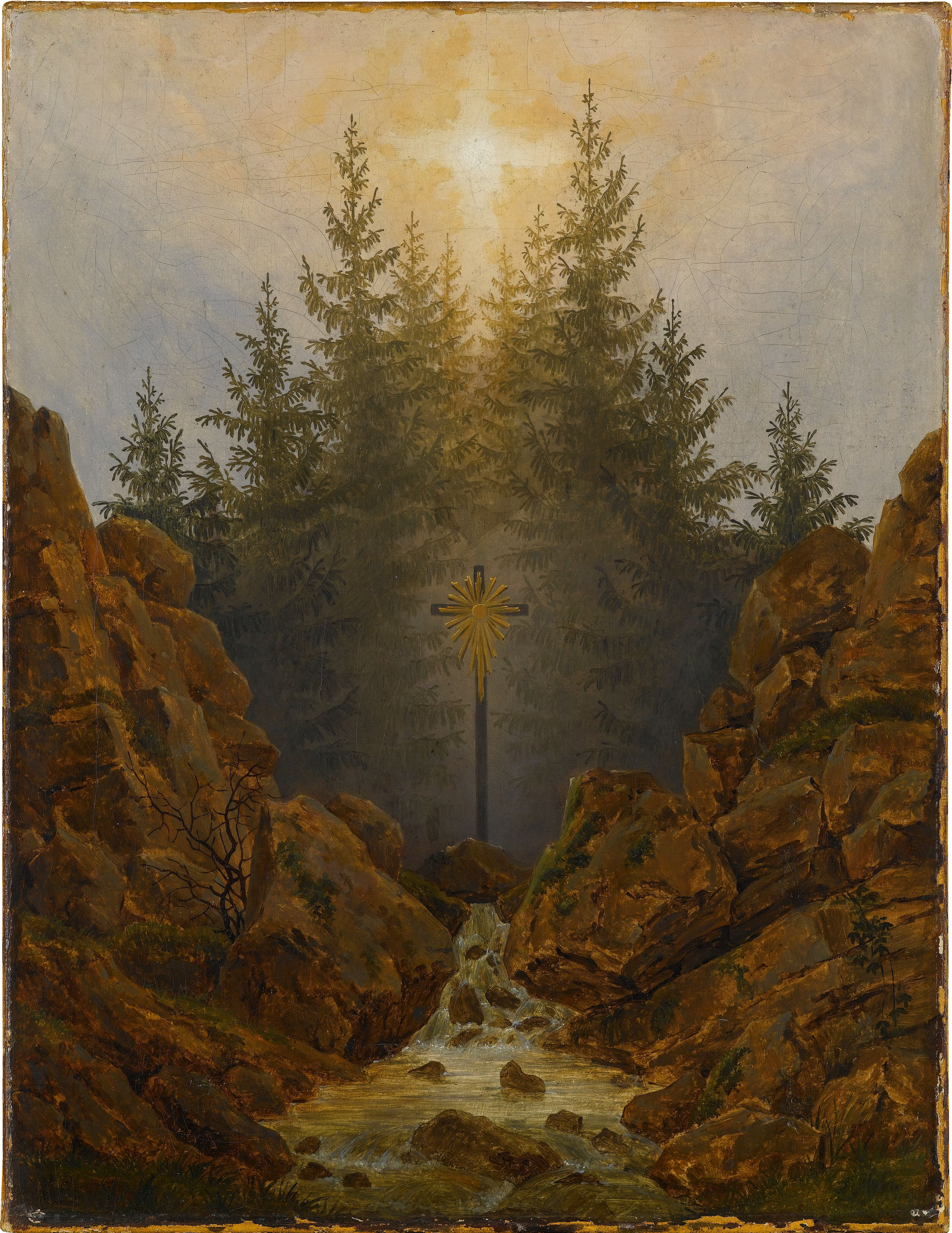
Cross in the Forest (1811). Later setting.

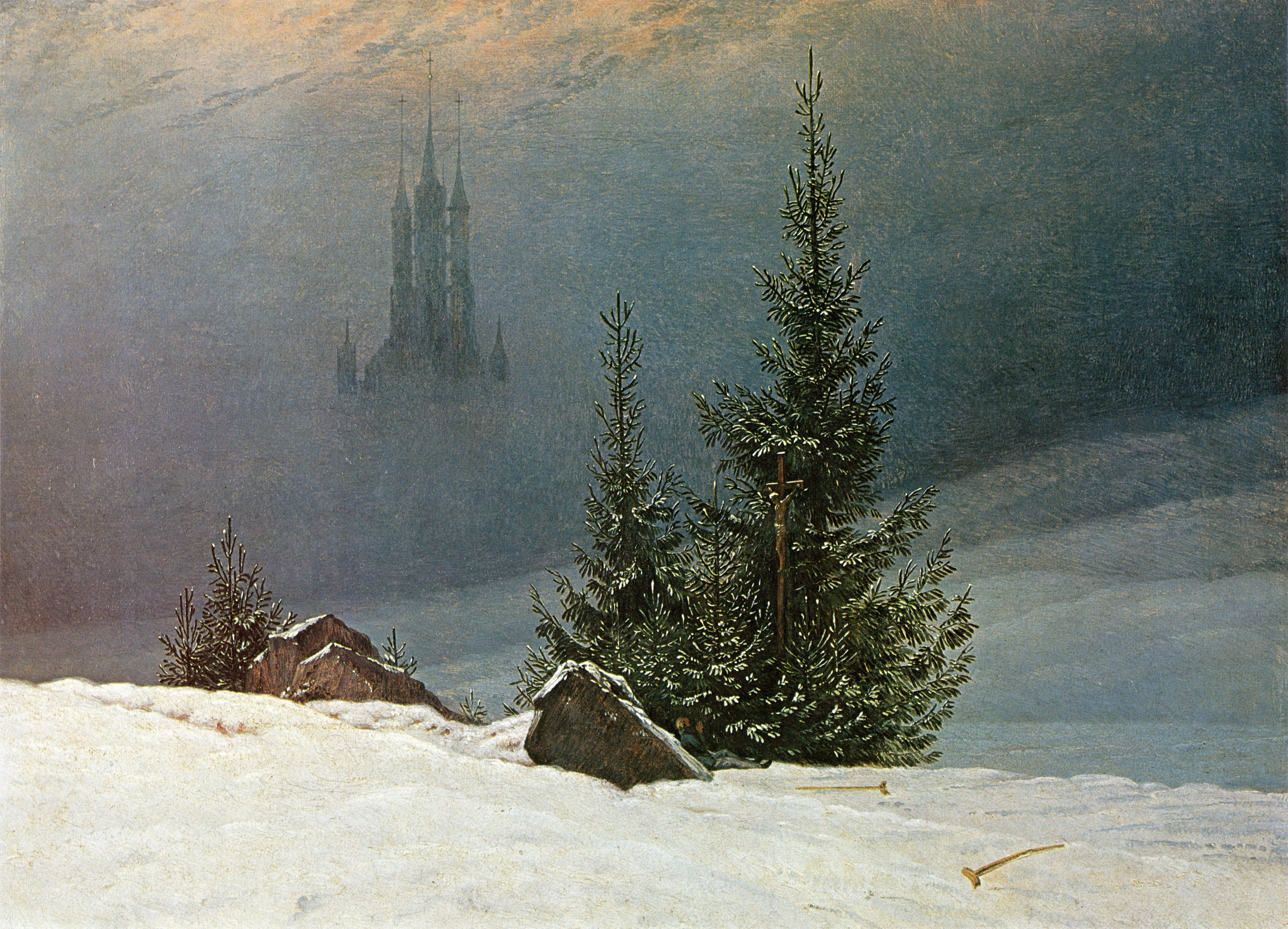
Winter Landscape with a Church (1811). Later setting.

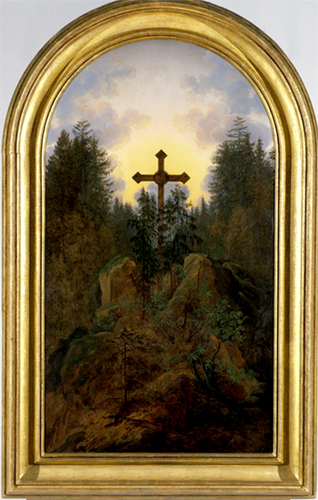
Cross in the Mountains (1814-1820; Ducal Museum Gotha)

== See also ==
- List of works by Caspar David Friedrich
- Summit cross

== Sources ==
- Grave, Johannes (2017) [2012]. Caspar David Friedrich (2nd ed.). London/New York: Prestel. ISBN 978-3-7913-8357-6.
- Koerner, Joseph Leo (2009) [1990]. Caspar David Friedrich and the Subject of Landscape (2nd ed.). London: Reaktion Books. ISBN 978-1-86189-439-7.
- Siegel, Linda (1978). Caspar David Friedrich and the Age of German Romanticism. Boston: Branden Publishing Co. ISBN 0-8283-1659-7.
- Wolf, Norbert (2003). Caspar David Friedrich. Köln: Taschen. ISBN 3-8228-2293-0.
