= Woman with a Raven at an Abyss =

c. 1803/04 print by the German Romantic painter Caspar David Friedrich

Woman with a Raven near an Abyss
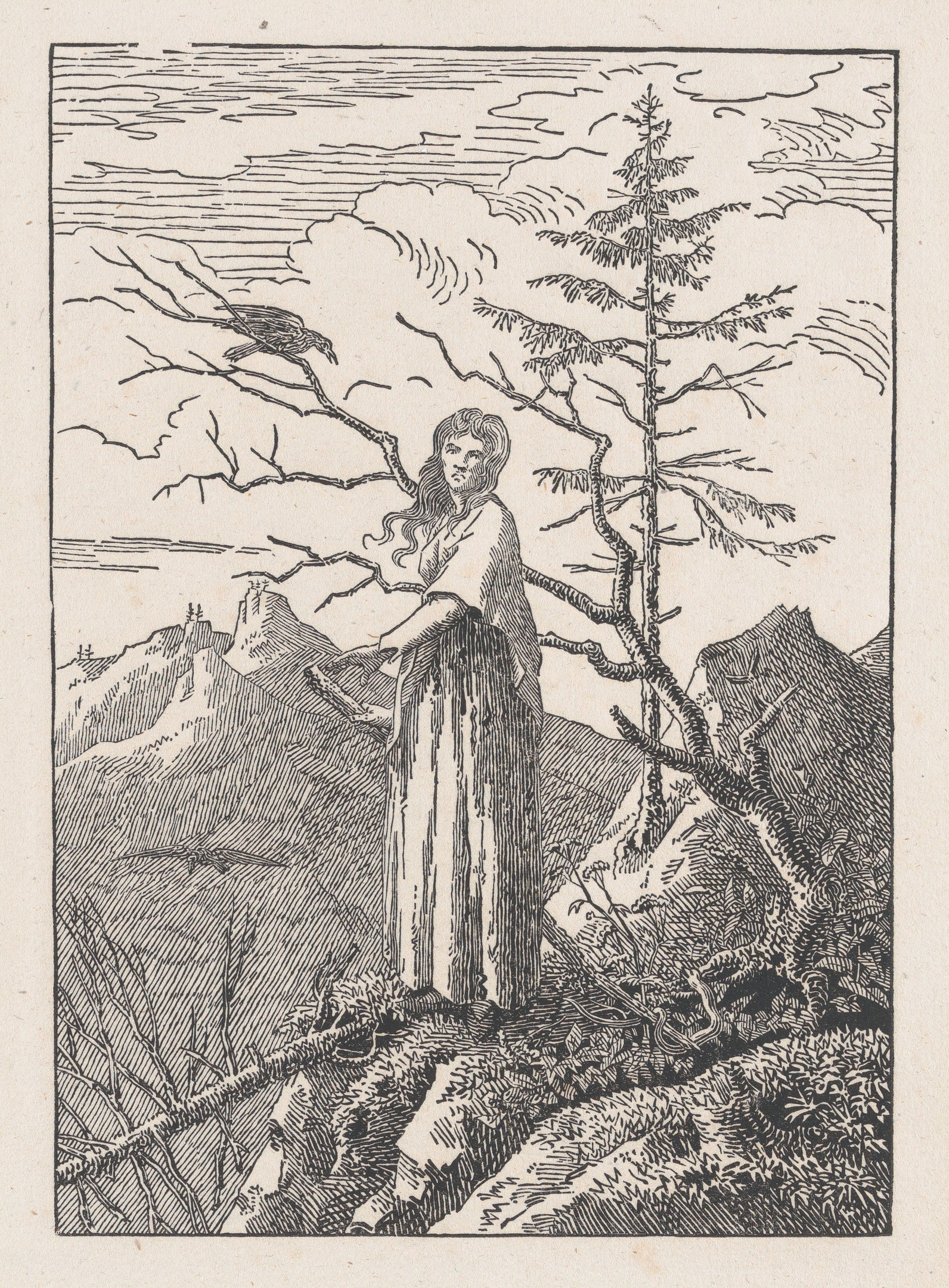
- Woodcut on ivory wove paper after Caspar David Friedrich's The woman with a Raven at a Precipice
- Artist: Christian Friedrich, after Caspar David Friedrich
- Year: both c.1803
- Type: drawing, then woodcut
- Dimensions: 23.5 cm × 17.5 cm (9.3 in × 6.9 in)

Woman with a Raven at an Abyss (or Woman with a Raven on a Precipice; German: Die Frau mit dem Raben am Abgrund) is a c. 1803/04 print by the German Romantic painter Caspar David Friedrich. It was made into a woodcut by his brother Christian Friedrich, a carpenter and furniture maker, around the same time.

The images evoke themes of loss, abandonment, loneliness, the shortness of life, and death. To achieve this effect, Fredrick employs nightmarish imagery, including a gothic wood of barren trees whose branches appear as if they were the arms of the dead, and a single vulture-like raven, drawn in an almost childlike manner that recalls fairy tale illustrations.

== Background ==
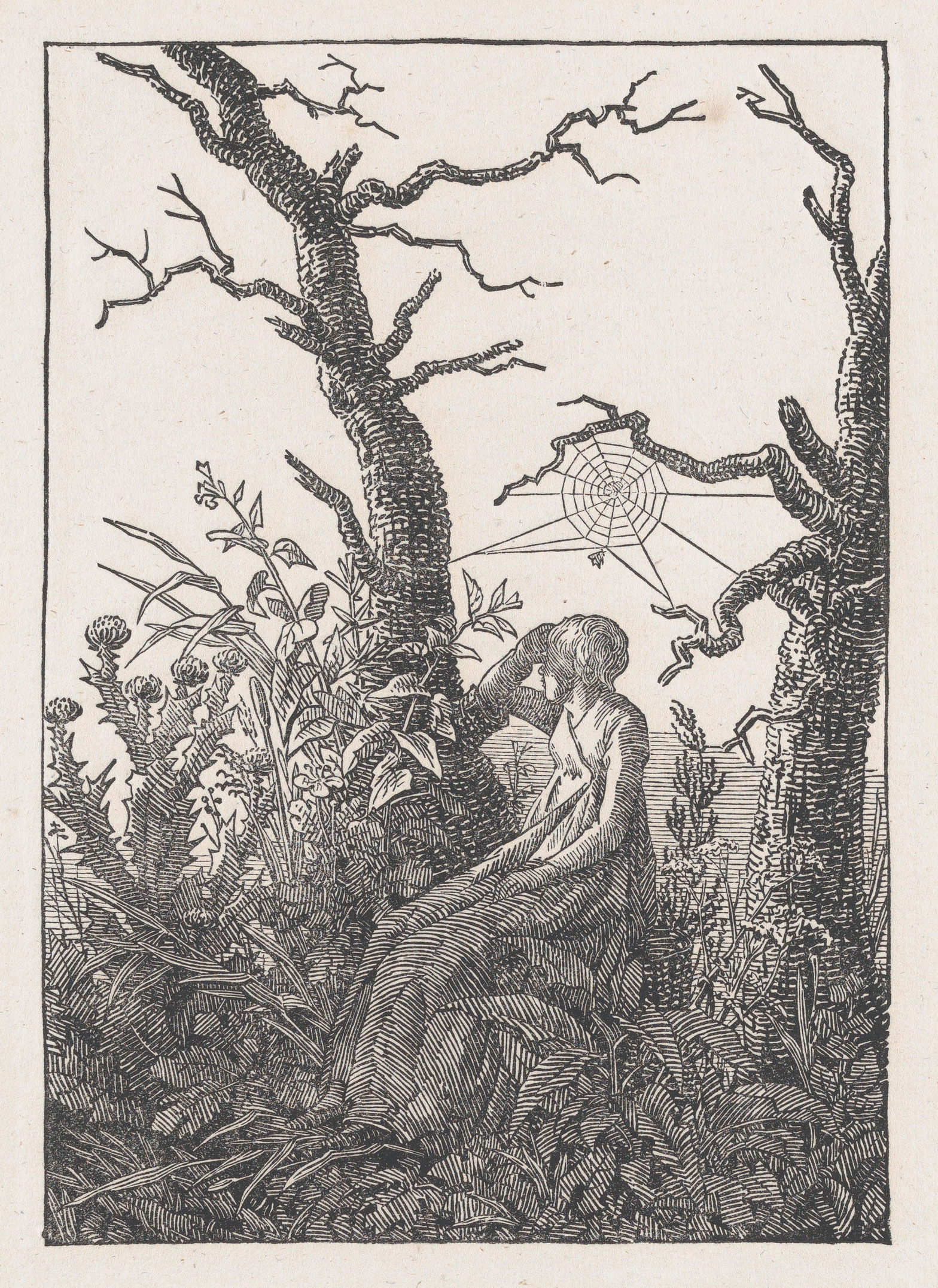
The Woman with the Spider's Web, 1803. Drawing (Caspar), then woodcut (Christian)

/It is one of four of Fredricks' drawings his brother cut as blocks. This work is darker but seen as a companion piece to the 1803 woodcut The Woman with the Spider's Web.

Like that work, the image may have been influenced by Ludwig Tieck's stories, particularly his 1797 fairy tale "Der blonde Eckbert", which contains passages where Eckbert's wife, Bertha, is abandoned by her husband and becomes stranded on an isolated mountain top, while she yearningly reflects on moments from their her youth.

== Description ==
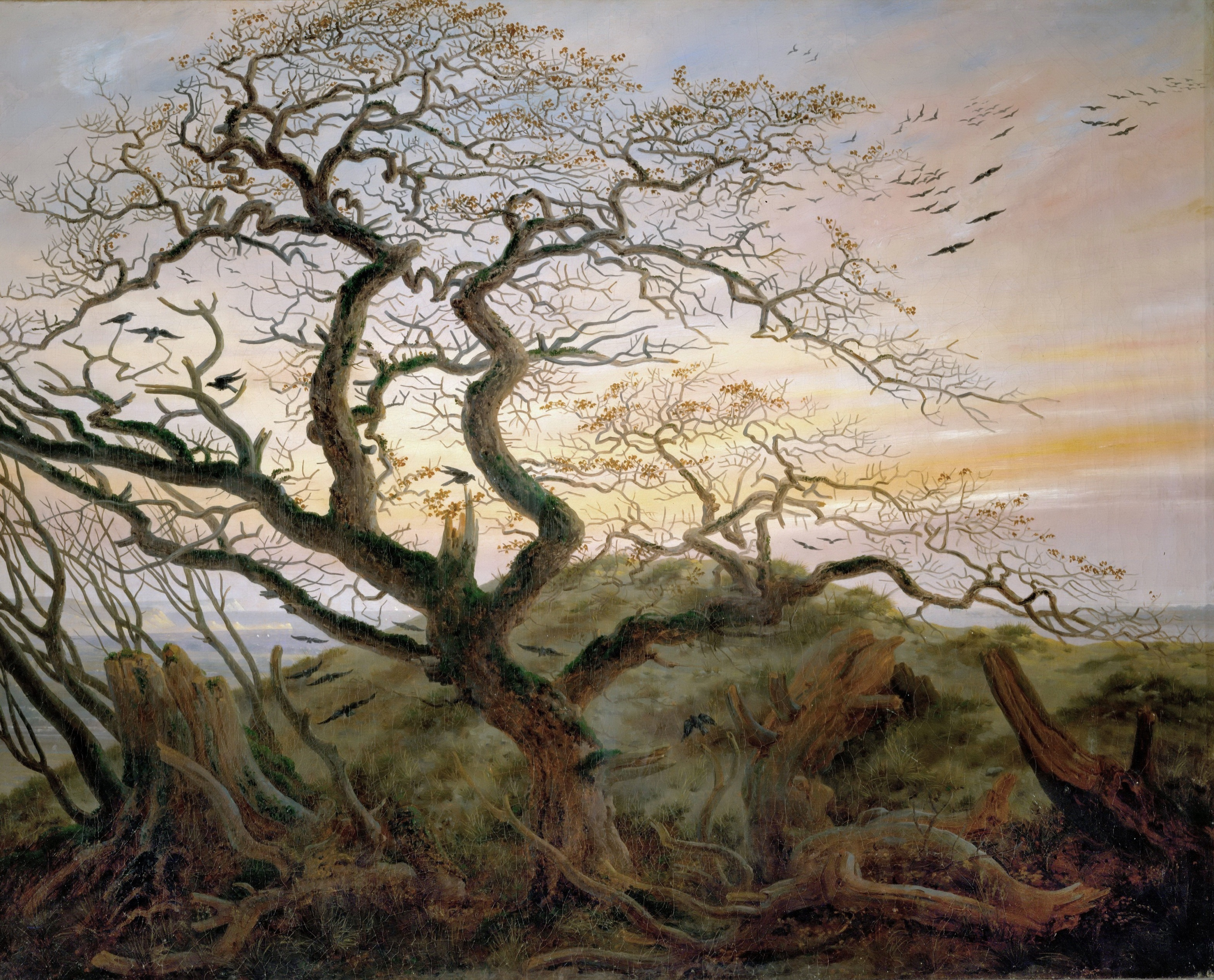
Caspar David Friedrich, The Tree of Crows, c 1822. Musée du Louvre

The figure is older than the woman in the "Spider's Web" drawing, and far more distressed. She stands at the edge of a chasm, turned towards the viewer with her left arm reaching out. Behind her is a fir tree, while a large raven, representing death or hopelessness, is perched on the arms of the dead tree beside her.

Around her are symbols of both the transience of life and death, as well as other objects that hint at physical and emotional isolation, including fallen trees, ravens, and a winding snake. Describing the image, the 20th century art historian Albert Boime writes that the image presents "a wild, disheveled woman at the edge of a precipitous cliff, grasping a branch like an oar, while a raven claws and a serpent slithers around the other end of her stick."

Friedrich later depicted ominous ravens in his c. 1822 painting, The Tree of Crows, where the birds are shown flying before a twisted oak tree and neolithic burial ground.

== See also ==
- List of works by Caspar David Friedrich

== Sources ==
- Bartrum, Giulia; Koerner, Joseph Leo; Kuhlemann, Ute. Albrecht Dürer and His Legacy: The Graphic Work of a Renaissance Artist. British Museum, 2002. ISBN 978-0-7141-2633-3
- Börsch-Supan, Helmut et al. Baltic Light: Early Open-Air Painting in Denmark and North Germany, Yale University Press, 2000. ISBN 0-300-08166-9
- Boime, Albert. A Social History of Modern Art: Art in an Age of Bonapartism, 1800-15. Volume 2. Chicago: University of Chicago Press, 1990. ISBN 978-0-2260-6335-5
- Drawings and Prints: Selections from the Permanent Collection. New York: Metropolitan Museum of Art, 2004
- Makholm, Kristin. Nineteenth–Century German Prints and Drawings from the Milwaukee Art Museum. Milwaukee: Milwaukee Art Museum, 2002
- Rewald, Sabine (ed). The Romantic Vision of Caspar David Friedrich: Paintings and Drawings from the U.S.S.R.. New York: Metropolitan Museum of Art, 1990
- Wolf, Norbert. Caspar David Friedrich: 1774-1840: The Painter of Stillness. Köln: Taschen, 2013. ISBN 3-8228-2293-0
