= The Woman with the Spider's Web =

Print by Caspar David Friedrich

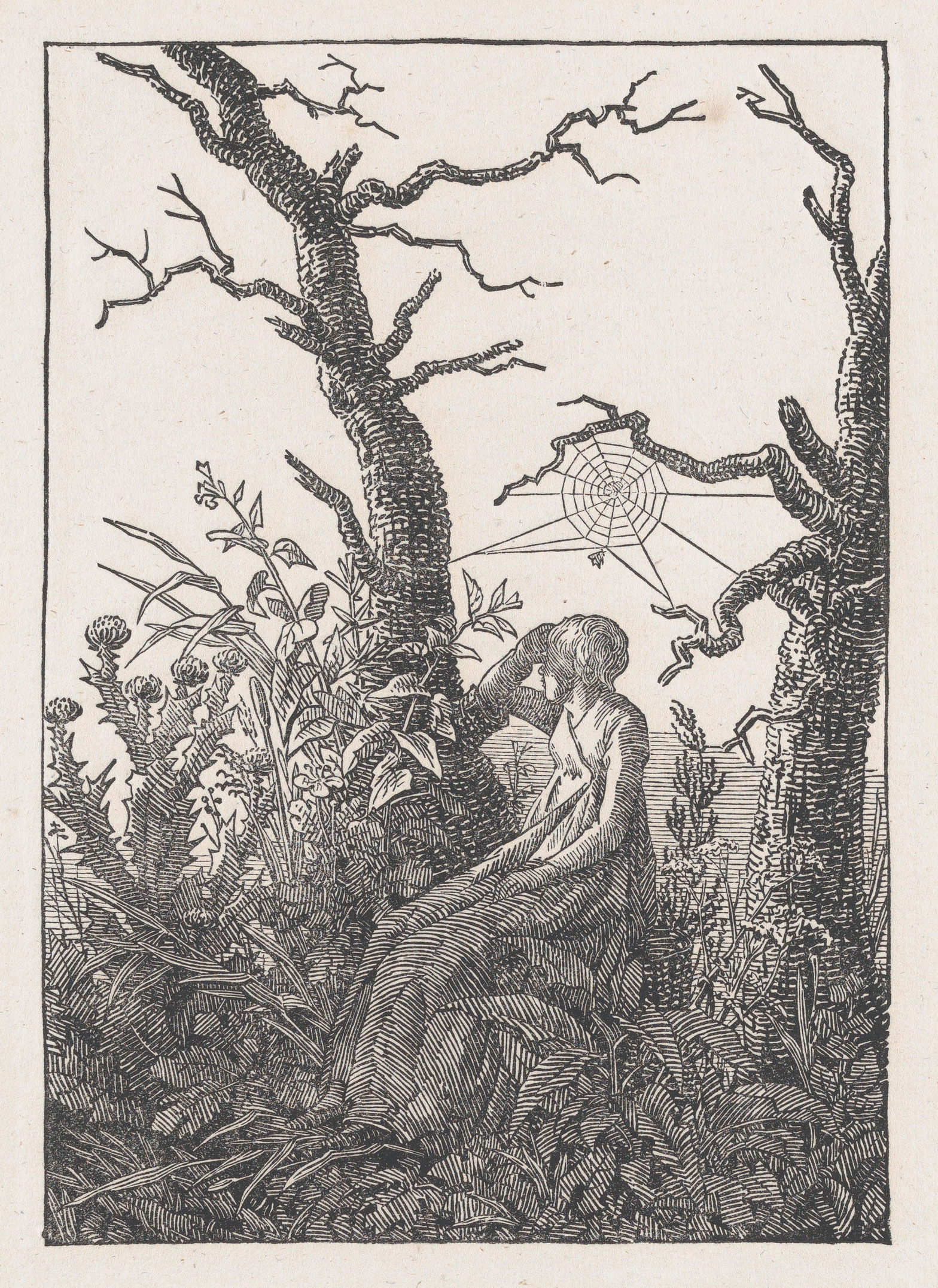
- Woodcut on ivory wove paper after Caspar David Friedrich's The woman with the Spider's Web
- Artist: Christian Friedrich, after Caspar David Friedrich
- Year: both c. 1803
- Type: drawing, then woodcut
- Dimensions: 17 cm × 11.9 cm (6.7 in × 4.7 in)

The Woman with the Spider's Web (or The Woman with the Spider's Web between Bare Trunks, German: Die Frau mit dem Spinnennetz zwischen kahlen Bäumen) is a small c. 1803 print by the German Romantic painter Caspar David Friedrich, made into a woodcut the same year by his brother Christian Friedrich, a carpenter and furniture maker.

The image explores themes of death and the transience of life. It shows a woman sitting alone under an eerie dead tree in which the upper branches appear as if scattering crows. The lower ground is surrounded by encroaching and engulfing weeds, which, reflecting her despair, seem as if about to envelope her. She rests one arm on the stump of a branch as she looks out mournfully and enigmatically to the far distance, perhaps looking towards an uncertain future, or waiting for the return of a long-lost lover.

The Woman with the Spider's Web was influenced by Albrecht Dürer's engraving Melencolia I (1514) and by characters from the romantic writings of Ludwig Tieck. It is part of a series that Christian cut from Caspar's drawings, however, Caspar appears to have been unhappy with the outcome and when asked by his brother to produce further works for transfer, he declined, writing, "ask another artist". Original cuts are in the British Museum and the Metropolitan Museum of Art, New York, amongst other locations.

== Description ==
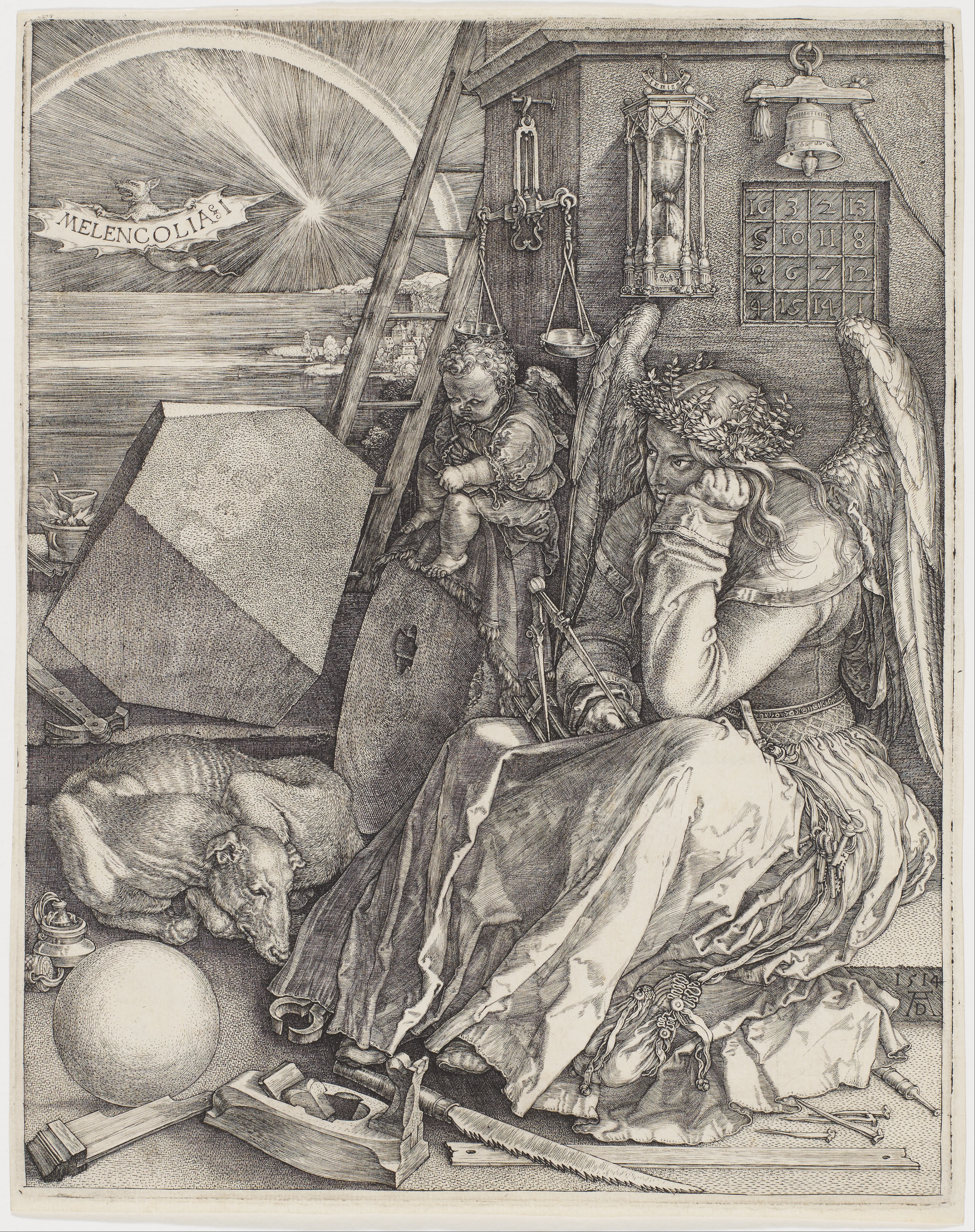
Albrecht Dürer's 1514 engraving Melencolia I

The image shows a female figure sitting by a dead tree as she solemnly looks into the distance, away from the viewer. Her elbow rests on a broken tree branch, while, according to art historian Albert Boime, "all around her weeds have sprung up (including the sickening thistles, traditional symbols of melancholy)". Many of the weeds are unnaturally oversized. Above her a spider has weaved a rather Gothic-looking web, in which an approaching insect is about to be entangled.

== Theme ==
The work is a highlight of Friedrich's obsession with dark and mysterious Gothic landscapes, and revisits his interest in nature and time. The work is sometimes known by the title Melancholy or Melancholie, a reference to Albrecht Dürer's 1514 engraving Melencolia I, on which it is closely modeled, and which is similar in pose and overall solemn mood.

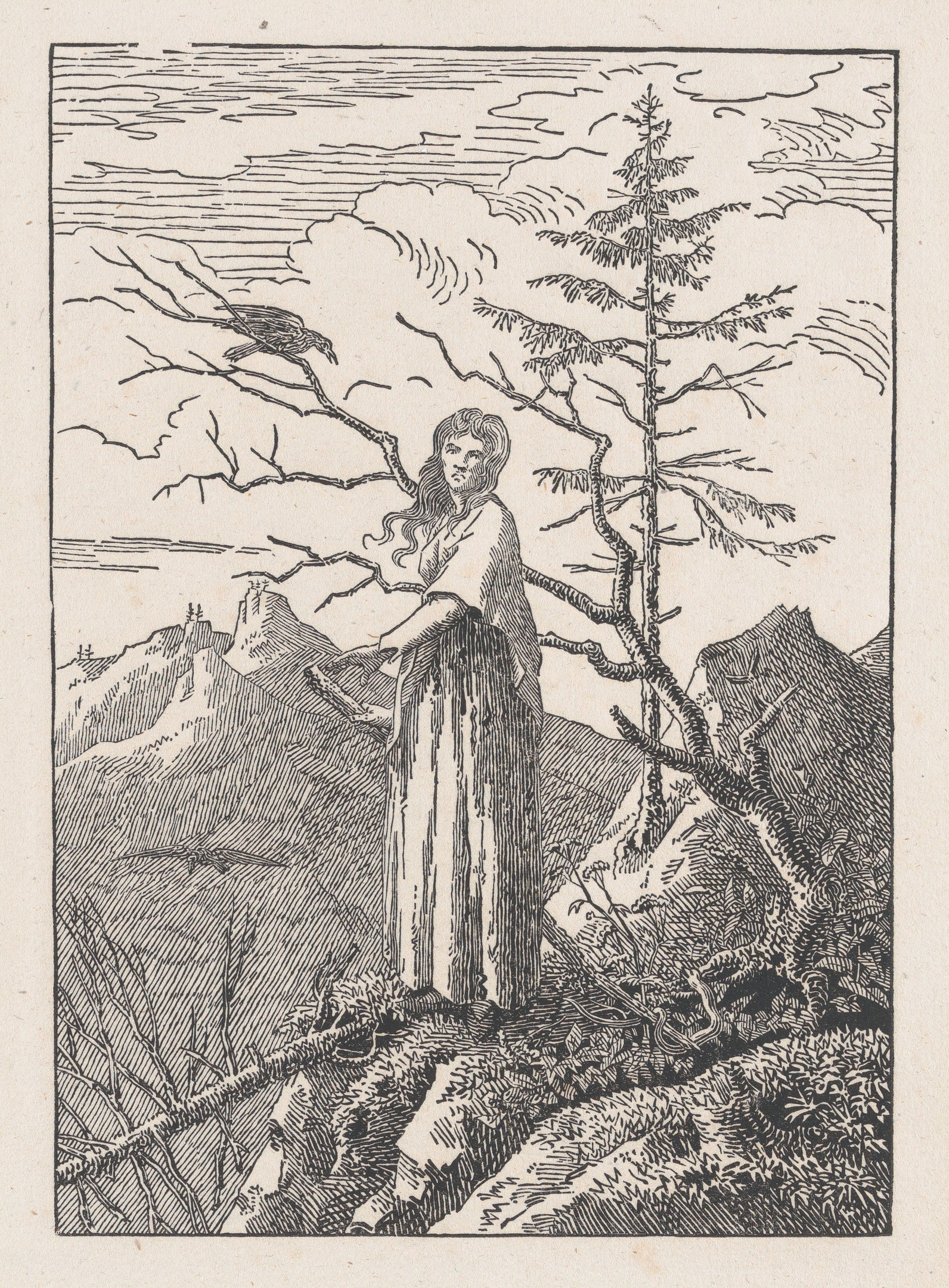
Woman with a Raven at an Abyss (Die Frau mit dem Raben am Abgrund), a c. 1803 woodcut of similar size and often considered a companion piece, although the woman seems older and is far more disheveled and distressed

But while Dürer's image was concerned with creative activity and the nature of scientific activity, Friedrich evokes a sense of mourning, and themes around the brevity and transience of life. The ephemeral nature of existence is suggested by the flowers and the spider's web. However, it may be simplistic to conclude that Friedrich felt a sense of hopefulness when considering death. According to the contemporary theorist of Early German Romanticism, Novalis, "death is the romanticizing principle of our life. Death is - Life. Life is strengthened by death", and thus the artist may have found solace and reinforcement when composing the image.

German Romanticism was in part founded on nationalism and historical pride, which perhaps explains why Friedrich reached back to Dürer's 16th century engraving. The drawing may have been influenced by Ludwig Tieck's stories, particularly his 1797 fairy tale "Der blonde Eckbert", which contains passages where Eckbert's wife, Bertha, is abandoned by her husband and becomes stranded on an isolated mountain top, while she yearningly reflects on moments from her youth.

== Bibliography ==
- Bartrum, Giulia; Koerner, Joseph Leo; Kuhlemann, Ute. Albrecht Dürer and His Legacy: The Graphic Work of a Renaissance Artist. British Museum, 2002. ISBN 978-0-7141-2633-3
- Boime, Albert. A Social History of Modern Art: Art in an Age of Bonapartism, 1800-15. Volume 2. Chicago: University of Chicago Press, 1990. ISBN 978-0-2260-6335-5
- Drawings and Prints: Selections from the Permanent Collection. New York: Metropolitan Museum of Art, 2004
- Rewald, Sabine (ed). The Romantic Vision of Caspar David Friedrich: Paintings and Drawings from the U.S.S.R. Archived 2019-01-07 at the Wayback Machine. New York: Metropolitan Museum of Art, 1990
- Wolf, Norbert. Caspar David Friedrich: 1774-1840: The Painter of Stillness. Köln: Taschen, 2013. ISBN 3-8228-2293-0
