= Seaside by Moonlight =

1818 painting by Caspar David Friedrich

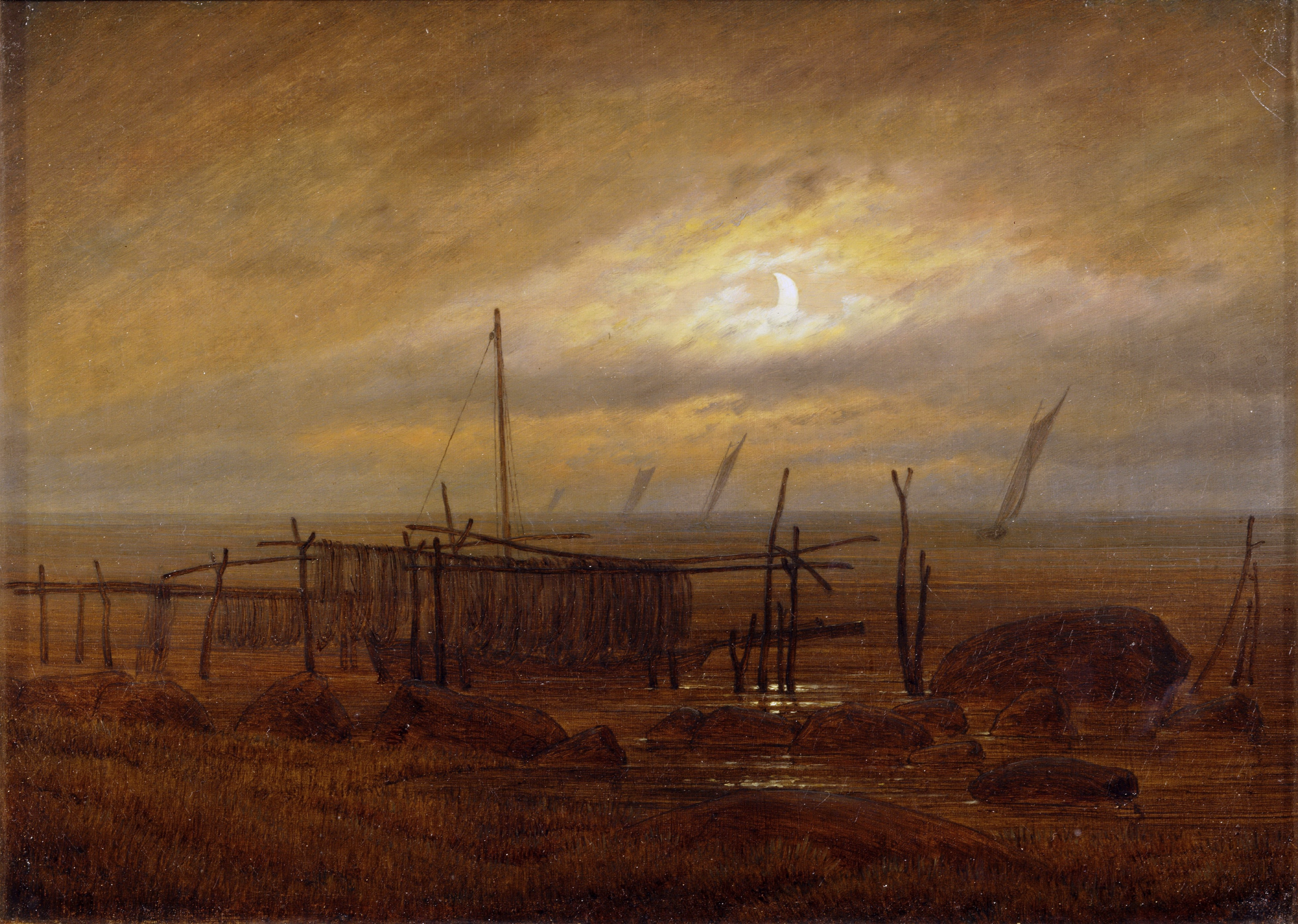
Seaside by Moonlight (1818) by Caspar David Friedrich

Seaside by Moonlight is an 1818 oil on canvas painting by Caspar David Friedrich. It is now in the Louvre Museum (RF 2000-3), to which it was given by the Société des Amis du Louvre in 2000, and now hangs in Room E on the second floor of the Aile Richelieu. It was the second Friedrich work acquired by the museum after The Tree of Crows in 1975.

The work was produced in late August 1818 after the artist returned to Dresden, where he was living, from his honeymoon on the German Baltic coast, where he had grown up. It drew on landscape studies he had made there, particularly in Greifswald and Rügen. During that stay he also produced the drawing Study of Ships near Vierow on 31 July, which fed directly into the painting.

== See also ==
- List of works by Caspar David Friedrich
