= The Virgin and Child with a Flower on a Grassy Bench =

Drawing attributed to Albrecht Dürer

The Virgin and Child With a Flower on a Grassy Bench
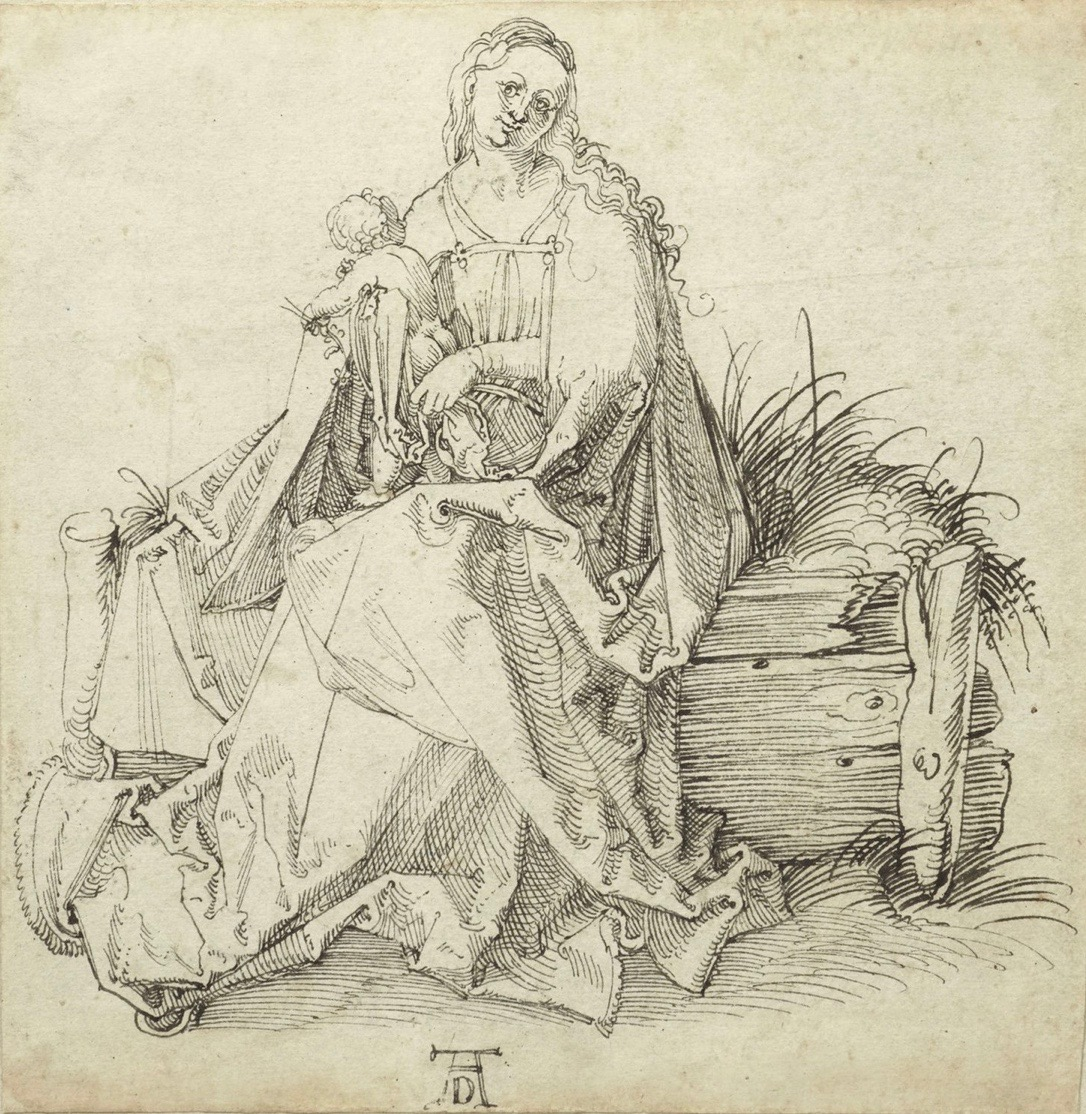
- Artist: Albrecht Dürer
- Type: Drawing

The Virgin and Child With a Flower on a Grassy Bench is a drawing attributed to Albrecht Dürer. The drawing depicts Mary and child seated on a bench.

== Provenance and rediscovery ==
The earliest provenance of The Virgin and Child With a Flower on a Grassy Bench remains unknown. It may have belonged to Rudolf II, Holy Roman Emperor, in Germany, and later was in the collection of an Italian noble family, and subsequently the collections of the Louvre. In the 20th century, it was likely owned by Count Hubert de Pourtalès in France. Pourtalès sold four different pieces by Dürer to Maison Carlhian, a Parisian antiques and art gallery; he likely sold The Virgin and Child With a Flower on a Grassy Bench to Maison Carlhian as well. The acquisition by Maison Carlhian has been reported as occurring in either 1912 or 1919.

After belonging to other members of the Carlhian family, the piece eventually entered the private collection of husband and wife Jean-Paul Carlhian and Elizabeth Ware Carlhian, both architects. Jean-Paul and Elizabeth lived in Concord, Massachusetts, and respectively died in 2012 and 2015. The Carlhians and their heirs did not believe the piece was an authentic drawing by Dürer, assuming instead that it was a reproduction. After the deaths of Jean-Paul and Elizabeth, in 2016, an anonymous buyer purchased the work at their estate sale, paying $30.

After the purchase, the owner kept the piece in his home, occasionally showing it to visitors. Brainerd Phillipson, the owner of a rare book shop and a friend of the owner, mentioned the piece to Clifford Schorer, an art dealer, indicating it could be a drawing by Dürer. Schorer initially dismissed the claim as impossible, telling Phillipson the piece must be an engraving. After receiving a photograph of the drawing from the owner, Schorer traveled to view it in person and became convinced it was either the "[...] greatest forgery [he'd] ever seen — or a masterpiece". At that meeting Schorer paid the owner $100,000 in exchange for the rights to sell the drawing. He then traveled extensively to verify the drawing's authenticity and provenance.

As of late 2021, the drawing is located at Agnews Gallery in London. The owner intends to sell the piece at auction in 2022.

== Attribution and authenticity ==
Jane McAusland, a British paper conservator, believes the work to be authentic. McAusland was initially skeptical due to newer pieces of paper attached to the drawing and due to apparent attempts to age the paper by dabbing it with coffee or tea. However, McAusland became convinced of its authenticity after she determined the paper was Italian linen—Dürer was active in Italy—and due to the presence of a watermark used exclusively by the artist.

Christof Metzger, a curator at the Albertina Museum in Vienna, and Giulia Bartrum, formerly a curator at the British Museum, attribute the work to Dürer. Both believe Dürer produced the drawing as a study for his 1506 watercolor, The Virgin with a Multitude of Animals.

Fritz Koreny, a former curator at the Albertina and a current researcher at the Institute for Art History at the University of Vienna, attributes the drawing to Hans Baldung. Baldung was a student of Dürer. As of late 2021, Koreny intends to publish an article outlining the reasoning behind his assertion. Metzger has refuted Koreny's claim.

== See also ==
- List of paintings by Albrecht Dürer
