= The Tree of Crows =

Painting by Caspar David Friedrich

- Krähenbaum (German)
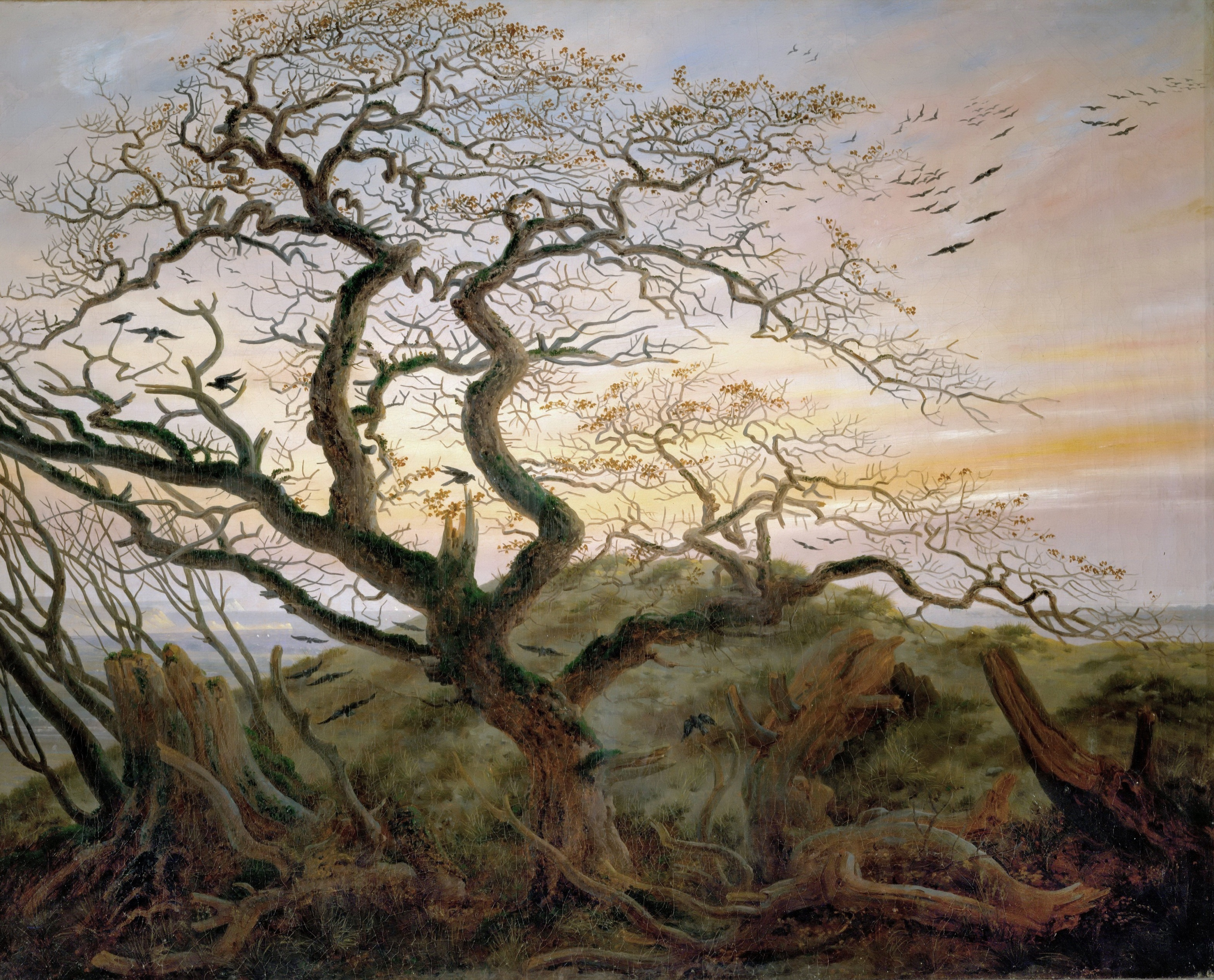
- Artist: Caspar David Friedrich
- Year: c. 1822
- Medium: Oil on canvas
- Dimensions: 59.0 cm × 73.0 cm (23.23 in × 28.74 in)
- Location: Louvre; Paris

The Tree of Crows (also known as Raven Tree) is an oil painting by the German Romantic artist Caspar David Friedrich, from 1822. Acquired by the Louvre in 1975 (the institution's first acquisition of a work by the artist, followed by Seaside by Moonlight in 2000), it has been called one of Friedrich's "most compelling paintings." The painting depicts a twisted oak tree, bare but for a few dead leaves, seen against an evening sky. An inscription on the back of the canvas refers to the hill at the painting's center as a Hünengrab, or dolmen, a prehistoric burial ground. In the distance can be seen the ocean, and Cape Arkona's chalk cliffs, a favorite subject of Friedrich's. Two crows are perched on the oak, while a flock (also known, more correctly, as a "murder") descends toward it. In the darkened foreground are a hacked trunk and the upright stump of another oak.

The oak is based on a drawing dated 3 May 1809, to which Friedrich added branches at the left and elongated others so as to stretch its forms across the picture plane; the tree in the painting has the overall shape of a rhombus, its web of contorted branches taking on a dramatic presence. Contrasted with the serene layers of chromatic clouds, the tree's forms have been likened to "many flailing arms." The foreground may be seen as representing death, with the distant sky offering consoling beauty and the promise of redemption afterlife.

A single dominant oak was also the subject of two later vertical compositions painted by Friedrich. In those paintings, the trees appear to stand in resignation, whereas that of The Tree of Crows seems animated by desperation.

== See also ==
- List of works by Caspar David Friedrich
