= Giulia Bartrum =

English curator

Giulia Bartrum (born 1954) is an art historian and museum professional who was Curator of German prints and drawings at the British Museum in London, England between 1991 and 2019.

== Career ==
Bartrum joined the British Museum's Department of Prints and Drawings in 1979. She became Curator of German prints and drawings in 1991. In the latter role she was also responsible for coordinating between departments, research into the provenance history of items held in the British Museum collections which may relate to the Nazi era.

Bartrum's first book was German renaissance prints 1490–1550, which was the catalogue of an exhibition held at the museum during 1995.

Bartrum is an authority on the art of Albrecht Dürer and her catalogue for the 2002-03 exhibition Albrecht Dürer and his Legacy, published jointly by the British Museum Press and Princeton University Press in 2002, won the 2003 Art Newspaper/AXA Exhibition Catalogue of the Year Prize. She edited a work on Edward Munch's prints in to accompany a 2019 exhibition Edvard Munch: love and angst, published by Thames & Hudson in collaboration with the British Museum.

Bartrum retired from the British Museum in November 2019. Along with other Dürer experts, Bartrum helped identify the rediscovered drawing The Virgin and Child With a Flower on a Grassy Bench as attributable to the artist in 2021.

== Selected publications ==
- German renaissance prints 1490–1550. British Museum Press, London, 1995. ISBN 978-0714126043
- Albrecht Dürer and his legacy: The graphic work of a renaissance artist. British Museum Press, London, 2002. (editor) ISBN 978-0714126333
- German romantic prints and drawings from an English private collection. British Museum Press, London, 2011. (editor) ISBN 978-0714126814
- Edvard Munch: love and angst, Thames & Hudson, London, 2019. (editor) ISBN 978-0500480465
