= The Sea of Ice =

Painting by Caspar David Friedrich

- Das Eismeer (German)
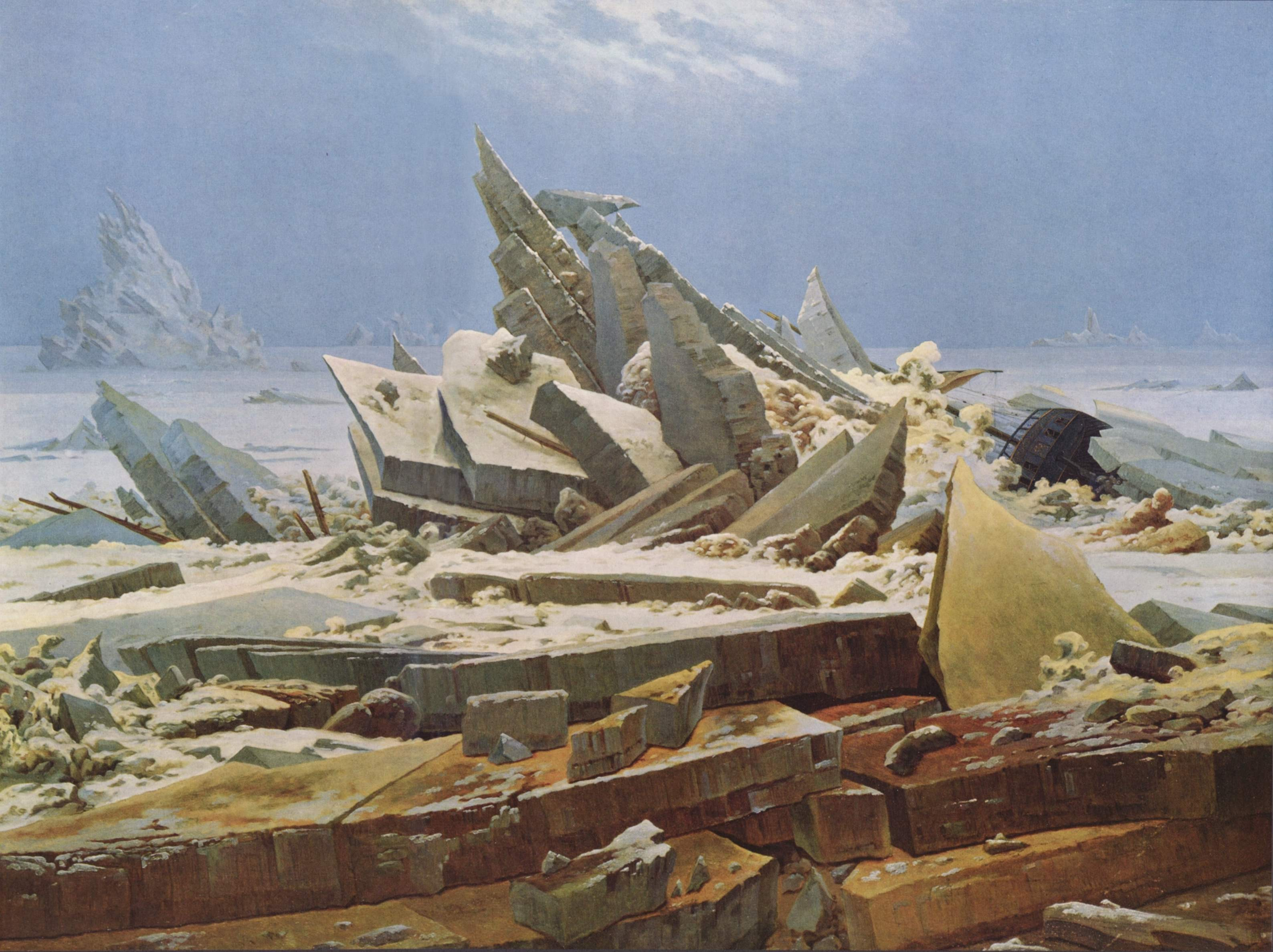
- Artist: Caspar David Friedrich
- Year: 1823–1824
- Medium: Oil on canvas
- Dimensions: 96.7 cm × 126.9 cm (38 in × 49.9 in)
- Location: Kunsthalle Hamburg, Hamburg

The Sea of Ice (German: Das Eismeer) is an 1823–1824 oil-on-canvas painting by the German Romantic painter Caspar David Friedrich. It depicts Friedrich's interpretation of an Arctic landscape, with a shipwreck half-buried in the ice. Its radical composition and subject matter were unusual for their time and the work was met with incomprehension. It has been retrospectively considered one of Friedrich's masterpieces.

The Sea of Ice was commissioned by Johann Gottlob von Quandt, who sought two paintings of southern and northern nature. Friedrich's influences are unconfirmed, but he likely drew upon William Edward Parry's 1820–1821 exhibition for the Northwest Passage; he also studied ice floes on the Elbe. Commentators have also linked it to Théodore Géricault's 'The Raft of the Medusa', and speculate it was influenced by the childhood death of Friedrich's brother, who fell through thin ice. The painting was first exhibited at the Prague Academy exhibition of 1824 titled An Idealized Scene of an Arctic Sea, with a Wrecked Ship on the Heaped Masses of Ice, and before 1826 it was called The Polar Sea. The painting was still unsold when Friedrich died in 1840. It is currently held by the Kunsthalle Hamburg in Hamburg.

== Background on Friedrich ==
Caspar David Friedrich was born on 5 September 1774 in Greifswald, Germany. He grew up a Protestant. Friedrich began studying art with a drawing teacher from the University of Greifswald named Johann Gottfried Quistorp. He went on to study at the Akademi for de Skønne Kunster in Copenhagen, Denmark from 1794 to 1798. After this Friedrich studied at the Hochschule der Bildenen Künste in Dresden, Germany. Friedrich decided to live the rest of his life in Dresden where he died on May 7, 1840.

=== Romanticism ===
The Romantic movement emerged at the end of the eighteenth century. Romanticism was both an artistic movement and an approach to life. It rejected the Enlightenment ideas of rationalism and intellect in favor of religion, emotion, and culture. A major theme in Romanticism is the focus on nature as the subject.

In the 19th century many Germans were interested in the Arctic including Friedrich. In German Romanticism the North was seen as a positive thing while the classic south was a negative thing.

=== Friedrich and Romanticism ===
Like many other painters in the 19th century, Friedrich decided to focus on landscapes as the main subjects of his paintings. Friedrich's style is considered to fit under the category of Romanticism because of his paintings of nature. His goal was to create on the canvas the images in his mind. Through his paintings, Friedrich attempted to show the spiritual and religious meaning of nature. Friedrich is famous for creating spiritual meaning in many of his paintings.

== History ==
The collector Johann Gottlob von Quandt commissioned two pictures that were to symbolize the south and the north. Johann Martin von Rohden received the commission to paint Southern Nature in her Abundant and Majestic Splendor, while the commission for Northern Nature in the whole of her Terrifying Beauty fell to Friedrich. However, as Vasily Zhukovsky in a letter dated 1821 reported, Friedrich –

himself does not even know what he will paint; he waits for the moment of inspiration, which (in his own words) occasionally comes in a dream.

Accounts of expeditions to the North Pole were occasionally published during those years which is probably how Friedrich became familiar with William Edward Parry's 1819–1820 expedition to find the Northwest Passage. In the winter of 1820–21, Friedrich made extensive oil studies of ice floes on the river Elbe, near Dresden. These were probably incorporated into The Sea of Ice.

The image created a lasting impression on the French sculptor David d'Angers during his visit to Dresden in 1834, which he described as follows:

Friedrich has a somber spirit. He has understood completely how to represent in landscape the great struggles of nature.

The painting has been known by several different names. In the catalogue of Friedrich's estate compiled following his death, it was called Ice Picture. The Disaster-stricken North Pole Expedition. Before this painting was made, in 1822, the same artist exhibited A Wrecked Ship Off the Coast of Greenland, also known as The Wreck of Hope. That painting was subsequently lost, and that title came to be used for The Sea of Ice, on occasion.

== Description ==
The Sea of Ice was composed in one of Friedrich's studios near Dresden. This painting is clearly based on the Arctic, though Friedrich had never visited the Arctic. It has been suggested that Friedrich gained his knowledge about the Arctic from the William Edward Parry's expedition. However, because there were multiple reports and articles about the Arctic in Germany, it has never been confirmed that Friedrich used Parry's expedition to paint The Sea of Ice. Friedrich also gained knowledge about icebergs through studying them on the Elbe.

The Sea of Ice represents what Friedrich believes the Arctic looks like. In the foreground of the painting there are small icebergs layered on top of each other, which makes them almost look like steps. In the background, however, the icebergs are crushed together to form a tower of ice. These icebergs are very large and suggest something terrible has happened. Right next to this massive ice tower is a minuscule detail that is not the subject of the painting. It is a shipwreck.

== Analysis ==
The shipwreck in The Sea of Ice suggests the idea that nature will always be superior to men. Ice is a place of death and nature will always defeat anyone who tries to intrude on it.

As a child, Friedrich suffered a traumatic experience which involved his brother, Johann Christoffer, who on 8 December 1787 fell through the ice on a body of water and died. It has been rumored that Friedrich might have forced his brother to go onto the ice. Some scholars have speculated that Friedrich's experience could have influenced this painting.

There is a theory that Friedrich painted this piece as a commentary on Germany. Just as the ship is frozen in ice, Germany is considered to be a frozen wasteland politically with no hope for improvement.

The work may have been inspired by Théodore Géricault's The Raft of the Medusa (1818–19). Friedrich's work shares with Géricault's a similar compositional framework and bleak metaphorical outlook in relation to the unforgiving sea. The tragedy represented in The Medusa is a human responsibility irrespective of the surroundings, while The Sea of Ice presents a more pessimistic message, with the tragedy a result of mankind's hubris in its attempts to master nature.

== Sublime ==
The theory of the sublime combines the emotion of horror and pleasure. The main theorists of the sublime are Edmund Burke, Immanuel Kant, and Friedrich Schiller. Nature has always been associated with the idea of the sublime. Towards the end of the 18th century, paintings of the Arctic were associated with the sublime. There has, however, been debate about whether or not the painting The Sea of Ice belongs to the category of the sublime. The shards of ice may convey danger, but they can also be seen as beautiful. One reason why there has been debate about whether or not this painting fits the sublime is that it is not clear if the viewer can actually be a part of the painting, which is a major element of the sublime.

== Influence ==
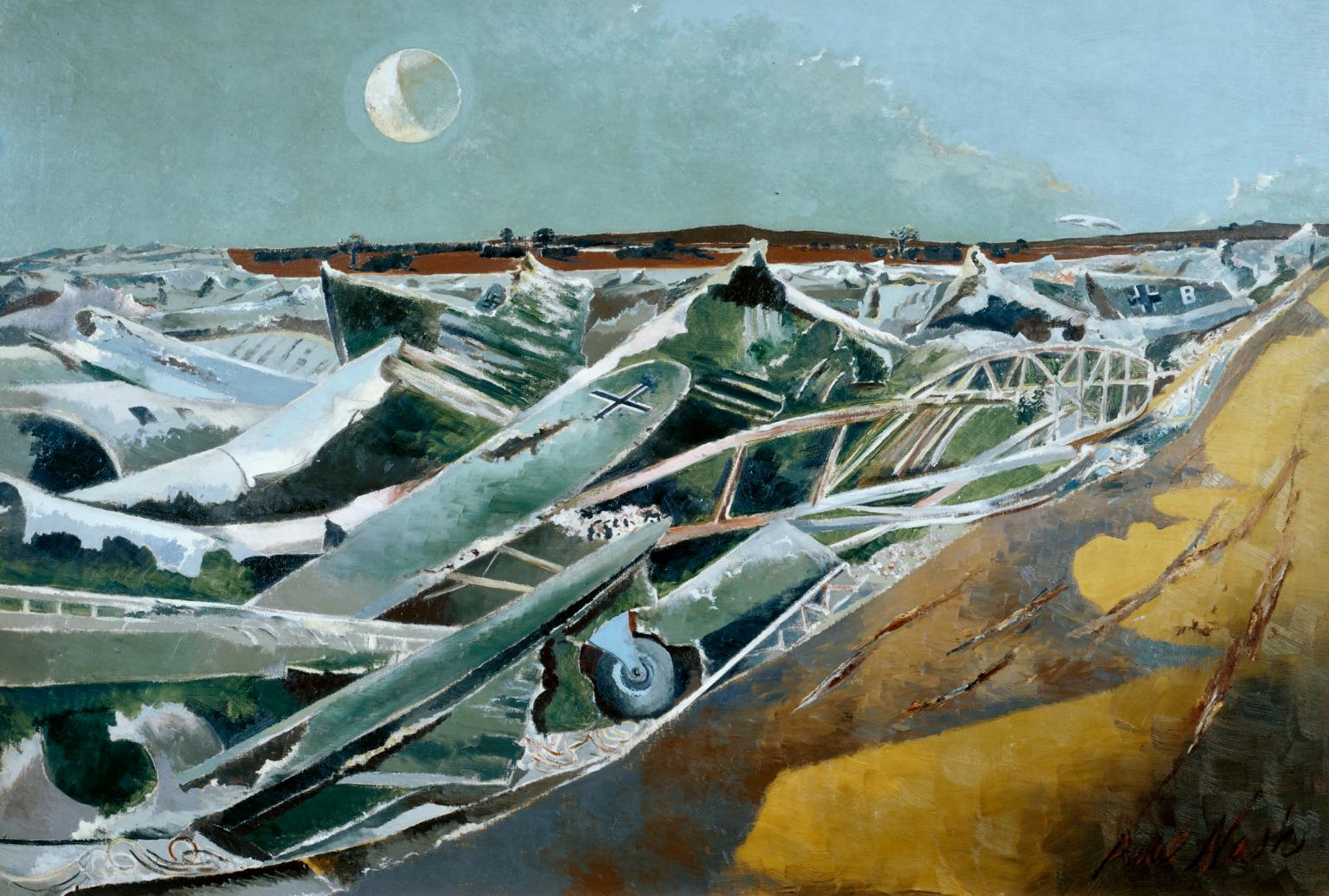
Paul Nash. Totes Meer, 1941, Tate Gallery

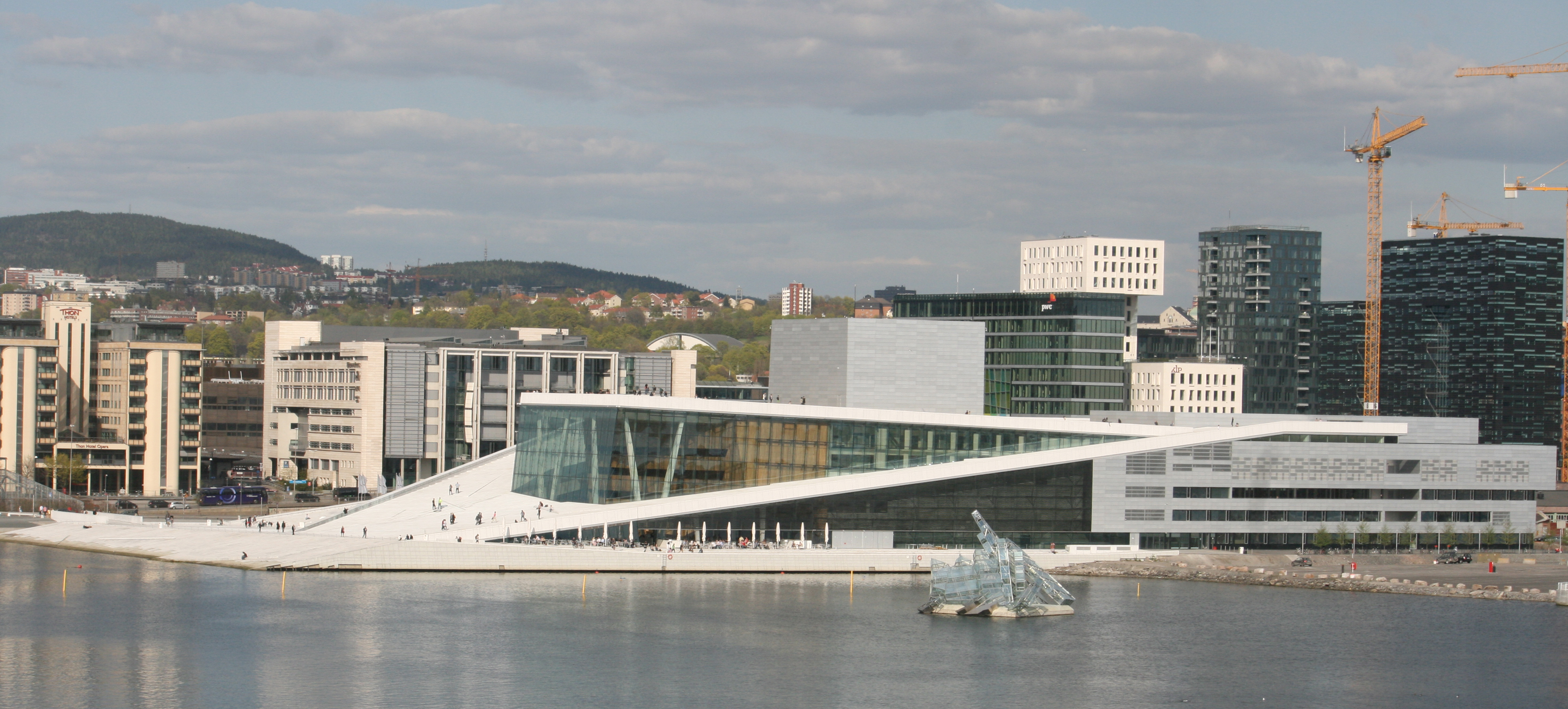
She Lies with the Oslo Opera House in background in 2010

The painting has been hailed by critic Russell Potter as a key instance of the "Arctic Sublime", and an influence on later nineteenth-century polar paintings.

The painting inspired Paul Nash's 1941 work Totes Meer (Dead Sea). It also proved influential upon the Arctic landscapes of Canadian artists Lawren Harris and Charles Stankievech.

Architect Thom Mayne references The Sea of Ice as a primary influence on his approach to the dynamic relationship between architecture, landscape, and nature. It possibly served as an inspiration for the Sydney Opera House.

The outdoor, free-floating sculpture She Lies by Monica Bonvicini is a three-dimensional interpretation of the original Friedrich painting installed in the Oslo fjord next to the Oslo Opera House. The sculpture opened in May 2010 and has become a tourist attraction.

A portion of the painting excluding the shipwreck was used for the cover of Finnish doom metal band Spiritus Mortis' fourth studio album The Year is One, released in 2016.

== See also ==
- List of works by Caspar David Friedrich
- 100 Great Paintings, 1980 BBC series
- Die gescheiterte Hoffnung
