= Battle of Britain (painting) =

1941 painting by Paul Nash

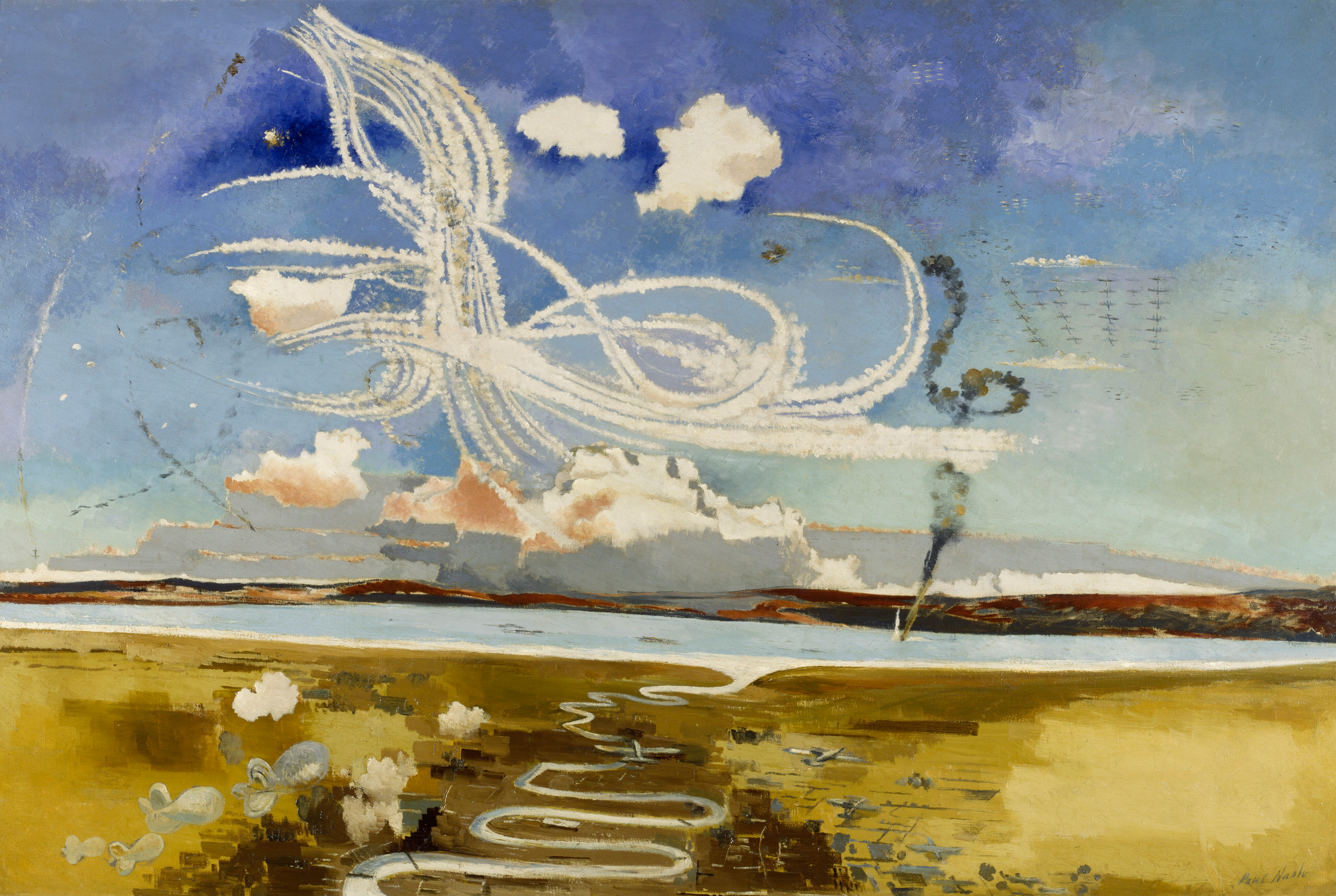
- Artist: Paul Nash
- Year: 1941
- Medium: Oil on canvas
- Dimensions: 122.6 cm × 183.5 cm (48.3 in × 72.2 in)
- Location: Imperial War Museum, London
- Website: Imperial War Museum

Battle of Britain is an oil on canvas painting by the British war artist Paul Nash, from 1941. It is a depiction of an aerial battle in the Battle of Britain during the Second World War. It measures 122.6 cm × 183.5 cm (48.3 in × 72.2 in). The large work was painted for the War Artists' Advisory Committee, and is held by the Imperial War Museums, in London.

Nash served on the Western Front in the First World War and became a war artist. He was engaged by the War Artists' Advisory Committee after the outbreak of the Second World War to paint for the Royal Air Force and the Air Ministry but his works were not well received by either and his full-time engagement was ended in December 1940. The Committee earmarked funds to buy further works from Nash, the first of which was Totes Meer, completed in March 1941 and the second was Battle of Britain. Two further works were completed under this arrangement, Defence of Albion (1942) and Battle of Germany (1944).

In his description of the painting, Nash wrote that it is "an attempt to give the sense of an aerial battle in operation over a wide area and thus summarises England's great aerial victory over Germany." It is not based on an event but rather is an attempt symbolically to depict the conflict between Britain and Nazi Germany, with free-flying British fighters battling ordered ranks of German aircraft. Nash included several landscape elements present throughout the Battle of Britain, white cumulus clouds above, a river meandering through yellowed fields and past a town to the coast; in the distance a view across the English Channel to occupied France. White vapour trails across the sky show the paths of dogfighting aircraft, amid dark smoke from several that have been damaged or crashed down in flames, while ranks of new Luftwaffe aircraft are approaching.

Nash based the sky on a 19th-century lithograph of a storm over Paris and the Seine, which his wife Margaret gave to his pupil, Richard Seddon. When Seddon viewed the painting at Nash's studio in Oxford, he suggested Nash should include more dark trails of smoke, adding one as an example which remains in Nash's finished work. Nash delivered the painting to the War Artists' Advisory Committee in October 1941, and it was exhibited at the National Gallery, London in January 1942. It is held by the Imperial War Museums.
