= The Ypres Salient at Night =

Painting by Paul Nash

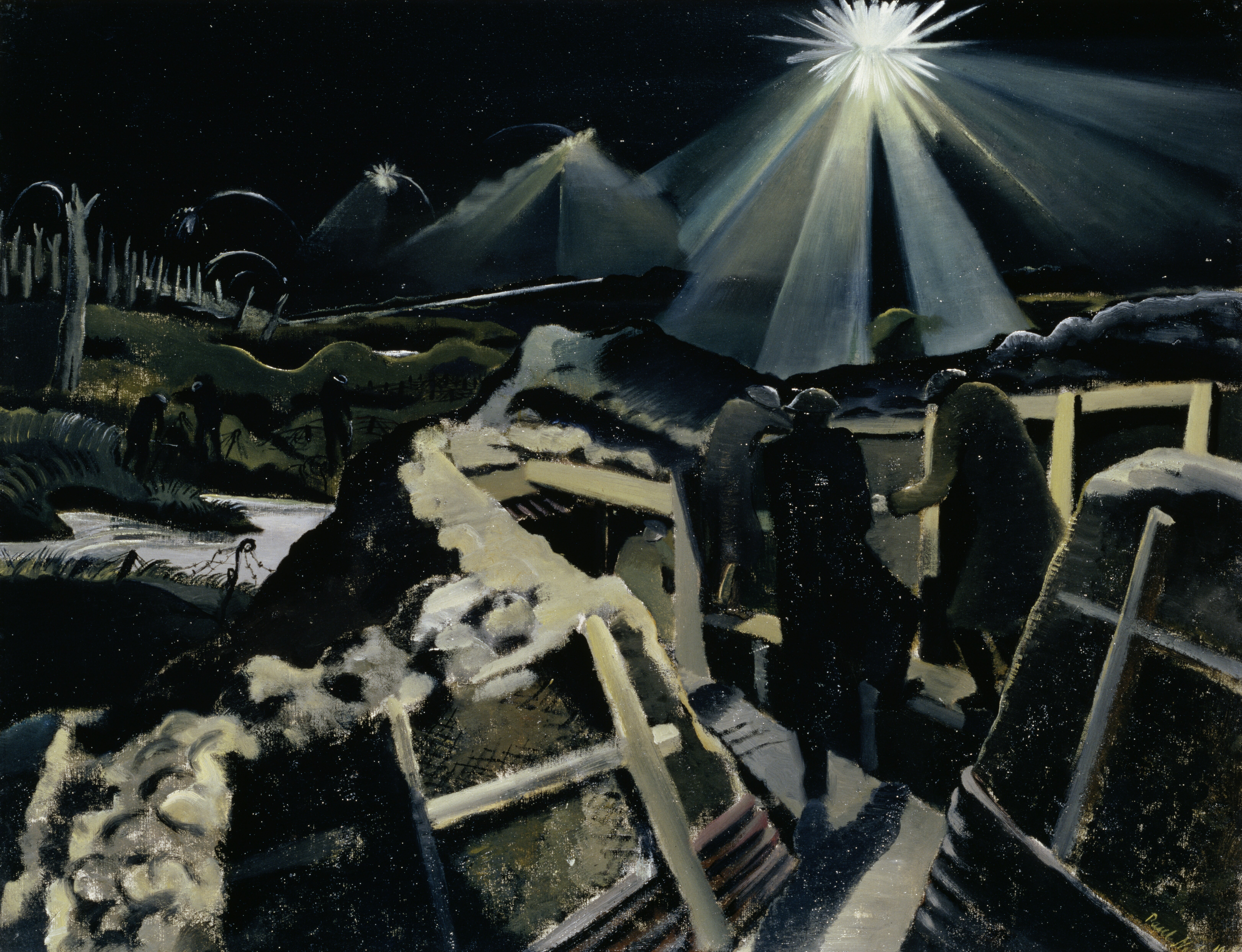
- Artist: Paul Nash
- Year: 1918
- Medium: Watercolour
- Dimensions: 71.4 cm × 92.0 cm (28.1 in × 36.2 in)
- Location: Imperial War Museum; London

The Ypres Salient at Night is a 1918 watercolour by English artist Paul Nash, which was produced during World War I. It depicts a scene from the Western Front near Ypres in Belgium, and was developed from an eye-witness sketch which Nash drew whilst at the scene in 1917. The drawing is in the collection of the Imperial War Museum, in London.

== Artist ==
Born in Kensington, London, England, in 1889, Paul Nash served in the Artists Rifles following the outbreak of World War I. He was subsequently commissioned as an officer in the Royal Hampshire Regiment. He was sent to Flanders in February 1917, but was invalided back to London in May 1917, a few days before his unit was nearly obliterated at the Battle of Messines. Nash became an official war artist and returned to the Ypres Salient, where he was shocked by the devastation caused by war. In six weeks on the Western Front, he completed what he called "fifty drawings of muddy places on the Front", one of which was The Ypres Salient at Night.

== Painting ==
It was painted in Nash's capacity as an officially commissioned war officer. The salient vexed the British military, as they were averse to losing any ground in the area; Nash viewed the landscape as a "a monument to doggedness." The illumination depicted comes from exploding star shells. The painting was acquired by the Ministry of Information.
