= Monica Bonvicini =

Italian artist

- Born: 3 February 1965 (age 61); Venice, Italy
- Education: Hochschule der Künste, Berlin; CalArts
- Known for: Conceptual art, installation art, sculpture
- Awards: Golden Lion

Monica Bonvicini (born 1965 in Venice) is a German-Italian artist who works with installation, sculpture, video, photography and drawing mediums to explore the relationships between architecture and space, power, gender and sexuality. She is considered part of a generation of artists that expanded on the critical practices of the 1960s and 1970s to conceive of space and architecture as a material that could engage with discourses of power and politics, defining art as an active form of ‘critique’. She was awarded the Golden Lion at the Venice Biennale in 1999 and the Preis der Nationalgalerie (The National Gallery Prize for Young Artists) from the Staatliche Museen zu Berlin in 2005. She was appointed Commander of the Order of Merit of the Italian Republic in 2012.

== Education and career ==
Bonvicini studied at the Hochschule der Künste in Berlin and at the California Institute of the Arts in Valencia. Having studied in Berlin since end of the 1980s, Bonvicini began exhibiting her work internationally in the mid-1990s.

In 1998, Bonvicini was featured in the 1st Berlin Biennale, and in 1999 in the 48th Venice Biennial curated by Harald Szeemann. With the architectural installation I Believe in the Skin of Things as in That of Women, 1999, she won the Golden Lion at the Venice Biennale in 1999 along with Bruna Esposito, Luisa Lambri, Paola Pivi, and Grazia Toderi. Since then Bonvicini has participated in more than 20 international contemporary art biennials, including the Santa Fe Biennial (1999), Gwangju Biennale (2006), the first New Orleans Biennial (2008), the Berlin Biennale (1998, 2003, 2014), the Venice Biennale (1999, 2001, 2005, 2011, 2015), the Istanbul Biennial (2003 -2017), and the Busan Biennale (2020).

Bonvicini has been a scholar for many years, starting as a guest professor at the Art Center College of Design in Pasadena, California, in 1998. From 2003 to 2017 she was a Professor of Sculpture and Performance Art at the Akademie der Bildenden Künste in Vienna, Austria. Since 2017, she has been Professor of Sculpture at the Universität der Künste Berlin. Bonvicini has also been invited to contribute as a guest lecturer in major institutions such as Columbia University, New York/US, Castello di Rivoli Museo d’Arte Contemporanea, Turin/Italy, Kunstmuseum Basel, Basel/Switzerland, Museum Ludwig, Cologne/Germany, Whitechapel Gallery, London/UK, Kunsthochschule Mainz, Mainz/Germany, among others.

In 2022, Monica Bonvicini obtained German citizenship and was elected as a member of the Akademie der Künste in Berlin, in the Visual Arts section. In 2012 she was appointed Commander of the Order of Merit of the Italian Republic. In 2005, she was awarded the Preis der Nationalgalerie für Junge Kunst, Berlin, Germany, followed by The Roland Prize for Art in Public Spaces, Bremen, Germany, in 2012, the Hans-Platschek-Prize, Hamburg, Germany, in 2019, The Acacia, Premio alla Carriera, Milan, Italy, in 2019 and the Oskar Kokoschka Prize, Vienna, Austria in 2020.

== Work ==
Monica Bonvicini works with a variety of media, her research encompasses psychoanalysis, labour, feminism, design and urbanity, and the influence of private and institutional spaces on behavioural codes. Commonly described as working site-specifically, Bonvicini creates discursive displays that relate to an exhibiting venue and its operational context. By employing text, humour, irony and often explicit material and language, her artworks challenge institutional boundaries and interrogate the role of the spectator. Her work critically examines the legacy of modernism addressing both its artistic and social dimensions, while also drawing upon references from minimalism, conceptual art, Institutional Critique, feminist and queer subcultures as well as civil rights and other political movements.

=== I Believe the Skin of Things as in That of Women, 1999 ===
The artwork, titled I Believe the Skin of Things as in That of Women, attained the Golden Lion award at the 1999 Venice Biennale, under the curation of Harald Szeemann. The installation constitutes an architectural space, constructed out of damaged drywall panels and aluminium studs, bearing quotes from famous male architects, including Auguste Perret and Adolf Loos. These quotations are paired with drawings in graphite of cartoon-style figures, some of which performing a variety of sexual acts. The sketches evoke the drawings found in Charles Eames’s seminal essay, “What is a House?” (1944) intended to illustrate the potential leisure activities within a residence, emblematic of a new, more adaptable modern domestic dwelling.

I Believe the Skin of Things as in That of Women, examines the “phenomenology of gendered architectural space”, focusing on the prevailing ideals of modernist architecture often shaped by its predominately male practitioners and theorists. The title of the work references the famous quotation by Le Corbusier evoking a debate between him and Auguste Perret. Where Le Corbusier advocated for horizontal windows, while Perret likened them to a man, asserting that windows should be vertical.

Art historian Elena Zanchelli has noted that I Believe in the Skin of Things as in that of Women references the canon of architectural history in three significant ways, effectively calling for a reevaluation of this historical narrative, “first, through the allusion to treatises on architecture based on certain methods of dividing space, including “public” and “private,” as well as in the role that is “assigned” to women in them, second, the fragile, temporary walls of the installations undermine the authority of these types of views; and third, Bonvicini also parodies the greats of modern architectural history simply by quoting their own statements, taking architecture’s fixation on the female gender out of its latency”

=== Never Again, 2005 ===
In 2005, Bonvicini was awarded the Preis der Nationalgalerie (The National Gallery Prize for Young Artists) for her work Never Again (2005). An exhibition of the four works by shortlisted artists Monica Bonvicini, John Bock, Angela Bulloch and Anri Sala was presented at the Hamburger Bahnhof in Berlin from 1 September - 16 October 2005.

Never Again (2005) is a large scale three dimensional grid of steel scaffolding, from which twelve black leather slings are suspended from thick chains. Viewers were invited to sit in the slings, which act as swings, the movement of which generated an intense rattling sound.

"Ordinarily a sex prop associated with leather fetish culture and violent pleasure, the multiple slings become inoffensive in this museum context. Still, Bonvicini’s chains and leather belts have a sensuous dimension, considering the imprints they might leave on naked flesh. Titled 'Never Again', the work suggests the intersection of sexuality and power in a theatrical and possibly an (unhappily) repetitive fashion.”

The work was exhibited again in 2008 at the National Gallery of Iceland in Art Against Architecture and in 2023 at Art Basel, Switzerland as part of their Unlimited program.

=== She Lies, 2010 ===
The permanent installation, titled She Lies, was publicly revealed on May 11, 2010. Commissioned by Public Art Norway, the artwork is situated on Oslofjord, positioned in front of the Oslo Opera House. Constructed from stainless steel, reflecting glass panels, and glass splinters, it stands on a styrofoam and concrete pontoon that is equipped with an anchoring system. The sculpture is not fixed but responds to the power of tides and wind, turning around its axis and moving within a range of 50 meters.

The monumental sculpture measuring 12 x 17 x 16 meters is an interpretation of Caspar David Friedrich’s 1824 painting Das Eismeer. Bonvicini reuses the imagery of the ice masses seen in Friedrich’s painting to establish connections with themes of ruin within the framework of Romantic ideals; central to this linkage are concepts intrinsic to Romanticism, including the reverence for nature and the pursuit of scientific inquiry. Bonvicini describes the work as: “the synthesis of structure/skin/ornament explore the interface between nature and culture, or that of a cultural artefact. While reconstructing a famous Romantic painting, the work represents in a visual striking way the shape of an iceberg, as if one would have, by circumstances due to the global warming, ended up in the fjord in front of the opera house. A built ruin in best modernistic style, the sculpture on water will stand for a permanent state of erection/construction.”

=== RUN, 2012 ===
RUN is a permanent installation at the Queen Elizabeth Olympic Park in London that was installed for the 2012 Summer Olympics. Bonvicini’s work stands in the plaza of the Copper Box Arena, and is the largest standalone artwork within the Olympic Park. The work’s title draws from the lyrical and linguistic aspects of popular music, with particular reference to The Velvet Underground’s “Run, Run, Run”, Neil Young’s “Running Dry” and Bruce Springsteen’s “Born to Run”.

Consisting of three nine meter high letters spelling out the word "run", the artwork is constructed from steel and reflective glass, each piece weighing ten tons. During the daylight the installation reflects its surroundings through its polished mirrored surface. At night the work is illuminated with an infinity mirror effect, facilitated by 8,000 high-powered LED lights that define the inner contours of the letters. The use of mirrored glass inside the construction and on the coated outer pane creates a double reflection, imbuing the work with an illusion of depth.

=== As Walls Keep Shifting, 2019 ===
As Walls Keep Shifting is a large-scale, site-specific artwork portraying a semi-detached house reconstruction, made from a wooden skeletal structure devoid of walls or windows, on a scale of 1:1.

The artwork is a replication of a Marcolini Villa, a prevalent architectural archetype found in the northern regions of Italy as well as Switzerland and France, designed in the late 1960’s to serve as the “ideal family home”. The design aimed to establish standardized living conditions while realizing the dream of homeownership for middle-income earners. In this work, Bonvicini is also drawing from her photographic series entitled Italian Homes (2019) characterised by a restrained architectural photographic style. This series captures the facade of these architecturally identical villas, distinguished only by the individualized modifications made by their respective owners.

The artwork was first exhibited at the OGR in Turin in 2019, presenting the sculptural architecture in its complete form, with all levels of the house assembled accurately. Subsequently for the 2020 Busan Biennale, the sculpture was rebuilt, however in this version it was completely accessible. In Bonvicini’s 2022 exhibition, I don’t Like You Very Much at Kunsthaus Granz, the sculpture was rebuilt, becoming dissected and fragmented, the upper floor merging with the ground floor and the roof leaning against the walls of the Kunsthaus.

The artwork’s title, As Walls Keep Shifting, derives from a quote in the novel “House of Leaves” novel by Mark Z. Danielewski, which explores the dynamics of power within the family system and the socio-economic periphery. The title of the work serves as a metaphorical image of the house as a living space. Curator Katia Huemer states on the Kunsthaus Granz iteration of the work, “The sculpture finally found itself in a state of total disaster….a stark physical experience that strikingly questioned the sanctity of the home."

=== Video works ===
In addition to her sculptural and two-dimensional works, Bonvicini also produces videos and multimedia installations. These artworks follow themes central to her practice, which include an examination of the politics surrounding the body, gender, space, and architecture. Some of these works originate from performances, such as her video work “No Head Man,” wherein four male actors are depicted running headfirst into walls. The work was initially conceived with the performance of the same title for the 27th São Paulo Art Biennial.

Bonvicini’s video works often adopt a minimalistic approach, drawing on references from the history of European Nouvelle Vague / Auteur cinema, Italian Neorealist cinema and avant-garde video artists, like Jack Goldstein. Examples of her video artworks include Hausfrau Swinging, 1997, Hammering Out (an old argument), 1998, Destroy She Said, 1998, and No Head Man, 2009, which are included in institutional collections worldwide, including Julia Stoschek collection, Sammlung Hoffmann, FRAC Lorraine and Castello di Rivoli.

=== Hurricanes and Other Catastrophes, 2006-ongoing ===
In 2006, Bonvicini began the ongoing series Hurricanes and Other Catastrophes, characterised by large-format drawings executed in black-and-white tempura paint. Resulting from her participation in Prospect 1. New Orleans the first New Orleans Biennial (2008 - 2009) where the artist was influenced by the aftermath of Hurricane Katrina in 2005, these artworks depict the destruction and devastation of homes wrought by natural disasters such as cyclones, tornadoes, and forest fires. Referencing both media imagery and her own photographs taken during her time in New Orleans, the series draws attention to the political consequences and social dislocations caused by global warming in the era of the Anthropocene.

=== NEVER TIRE, 2020 ===
NEVER TIRE, a series of spray drawings made by Bonvicini at the beginning of 2020, was produced in response to the socio-political and emotional impacts of the COVID-19 pandemic. First exhibited at Kunsthalle Bielefeld in the solo exhibition Monica Bonvicini: Lover's Material, these drawings feature text on soft pink, grey or black backgrounds with faint grid lines, some incorporating images cast from sprayed chains or barbed wire. Christina Végh, Director of Kunsthalle Bielefeld, describes the series as a "cartography of emotions," exploring various modes of connection and tension within relationships. Themes such as love, aggression, feminism, and rage are depicted through fragments from notable authors like Roland Barthes, Judith Butler, Natalie Diaz, Soraya Chemaly, and Andrea Dworkin, that have been reshaped by Bonvicini into new syntactic and semantic forms. The sentences are cut, reversed and changed to be given new meaning, often playing on the aesthetic of graffiti and protest signs. The pieces are presented on vertical aluminum panels with visible metal edges, intended to be reminiscent of the aesthetic of graffiti and protest signage.

== Exhibitions (selection) ==
- 2024: Gisela Capitain, Cologne, & Liberation
- 2022: Neue Nationalgalerie, Berlin, I do You
- 2022: Kunsthaus Graz, I Don't Like You Very Much
- 2020: Italian Cultural Institute Stockholm, Power Joy Humor Resistance
- 2020: Kunsthalle Bielefeld, Lover's Material
- 2019: OGR Torino, As Walls Keep Shifting
- 2019: Belvedere 21, Vienna, I CANNOT HIDE MY ANGER
- 2018 König Galerie, Berlin, GUILT
- 2018: Monash University Museum of Art, Melbourne, Unsettlement
- 2017-18: Berlinische Galerie, Berlin, 3612,54 m³ vs 0,05 m³
- 2017: Istanbul Biennial, a good neighbour
- 2017: Deichtorhallen, Hamburg, Elbphilharmonie Revisited
- 2016: BALTIC Centre for Contemporary Art, Gateshead, her hand around the room
- 2014: Witte de With - Center for Contemporary Art, Rotterdam, The Crime was almost perfect
- 2013: Hamburger Bahnhof, Berlin, Wall Works
- 2013: Kunsthalle Mainz, Monica Bonvicini Sterling Ruby
- 2012: Museum Abteiberg, Mönchengladbach, und Deichtorhallen, Hamburg, Desire, Desiese, Devise – Zeichnungen 1986–2012.
- 2012: La Triennale (3), Palais de Tokyo, Paris
- 2011: Centro de Arte Contemporaneo de Malága
- 2011: Museum Ludwig, Cologne
- 2011: Dublin Contemporary 2011, Dublin
- 2010: Kunsthalle Fridericianum, Kassel; Both Ends
- 2009: The Art Institute of Chicago
- 2009: Frac des Pays de la Loire
- 2009: Kunstmuseum Basel
- 2008: MARCO, Museo de Arte Contemporánea de Vigo, Vigo
- 2008: New Orleans Biennal (1), New Orleans
- 2007: Bonniers Konsthall, Stockholm
- 2005: Hamburger Bahnhof, Berlin
- 2002: New Museum of Contemporary Art, New York
- 2002: Palais de Tokyo, Paris
- 2002: Museum of Modern Art, Oxford
- 1994: Kunst-Werke, Berlin

== Works in public collections (selection) ==
- TBA21 - Thyssen-Bornemisza Art Contemporary, Wien
- Neue Nationalgalerie, Berlin
- Fondazione MAXXI, Rome
- Frac des Pays de la Loire, Carquefou
- FRAC Lorraine, Metz
- Museo d'Arte Contemporanea Castello di Rivoli, Turin
- Museion, Bozen
- Migros Museum für Gegenwartskunst, Zürich
- Museum of Modern Art (MOMA), New York
- Lenbachhaus, München
- Museum of Art in Łódź, Lodz
- Julia Stoschek Collection, Berlin

== Publications (selection) ==
- Monica Bonvicini. As Walls Keep Shifting, exhibition catalogue Kunsthaus Graz and Kunst Museum Winterthur, with texts by Konrad Bitterli, Monica Bonvicini, Jacob Fabricius, Katia Huemer, Hans Ulrich Obrist, Samuele Piazza, Barbara Steiner, Elena Zanichelli, Walther König, Cologne, 2023. ISBN 978-3-7533-0308-6
- Monica Bonvicini. I do you, exhibition catalogue Neue Nationalgalerie, with texts by Joachim Jäger, Irina Hiebert Grun, David Adjaye, Diedrich Diederichsen, Dario Gamboni, Distanz Verlag, Berlin, 2023. ISBN 978-3-95476-506-5
- Monica Bonvicini. Hot Like Hell, exhibition catalogue Kunsthalle Bielefeld, edited by Christina Végh, Snoeck Verlagsgesellschaft, Cologne 2021. ISBN 978-3-86442-336-9
- Monica Bonvicni. I CANNOT HIDE MY ANGER., exhibition catalogue Belvedere 21, König Books, 2019. ISBN 978-3-96098-641-6
- Monica Bonvicini., exhibition catalogue Berlinische Galerie, with texts by Dr. Thomas Köhler, Kate Sutton, Kerber Verlag, 2017. ISBN 978-3-7356-0388-3
- Monica Bonvicini. Survey by Janet Kraynak, Interview by Alexander Alberro, Focus by Juliane Rebentisch, Artist’s Writing by Monica Bonvicini. Phaidon Press, 2014. ISBN 978-0-7148-6705-2
- Monica Bonvicini – Disegni., exhibition catalogue Museum Abteiberg Mönchengladbach, Deichtorhallen Hamburg/Sammlung Falckenberg, Distanz Verlag, Berlin 2012. ISBN 978-3-942405-68-3
- Monica Bonvicini. A BLACK HOLE OF NEEDS, HOPES AND AMBITIONS, exhibition catalogue Gestión Cultural y Comunicácion – CAC Malaga, with texts by Fernando Francés, Carson Chan, Malaga, 2011. ISBN 978-84-96159-99-0
- Monica Bonvicini. Both Ends., exhibition catalogue Kunsthalle Fridericianum, Verlag der Buchhandlung Walther König, Cologne 2010. ISBN 978-3-86560-873-4
- Monica Bonvicini, exhibition catalogue Städtische Galerie im Lenbachhaus und Kunstbau, Munich, Museum für Gegenwartskunst, Basel, with texts by Matthias Mühling, Nikola Dietrich, Jan Verwoert, DuMont, Cologne, 2009. ISBN 978-3-8321-9220-4
- Monica Bonvicini Anxiety Attack, exhibition catalogue Modern Art Oxford/ Tramway, Oxford / Glasgow, with texts by Suzanne Cotter, Miria Swain, 2003. ISBN 978-1901352177
- Monica Bonvicini / Sam Durant. Break it / Fix it, exhibition catalogue Secession Wien, Revolver Publishing, Frankfurt (am Main) 2003. ISBN 3-901926-64-X
- Monica Bonvicini: Scream & Shake, exhibition catalogue Le Magasin, Centre National d’Art Contemporain, Grenoble, with texts by Lionel Bovier, Joshua Decter, Diedrich Diederichsen, Donna Petrescu, Interview between Monica Bonvicini and Andrea Bowers, 2001. ISBN 978-2906732728
- Monica Bonvicini. Bau, exhibition catalogue GAM Galleria Civica d’Arte Moderna e Contemporanea Torino and hopefulmonster, with texts by Dan Cameron, Susanne von Falkenhausen, 2000. ISBN 88-7757-106-3
- Monica Bonvicini, exhibition catalogue De Appel Foundation, with texts by Jan Ralske, De Appel Foundation, Amsterdam, 1999. ISBN 90-73501-45-8
- Monica Bonvicini – platz machen, published by Goldrausch Frauennetzwerk, e.V., Künstlerinnen-projekt “Ohne Kompromiß“, with a text by Harald Fricke, Berlin, 1994.

== Bibliography (selection) ==
- Casati, R. (Host). (2020, October 98). The Grisebach-Podcast (No.10) [Audio podcast episode] Accessed 15 February 2021: https://grisebach.podigee.io/10-neue-episode
- Jennifer Allen. "You Have Something under Your Belt and Something over Your Head. And You Need Both" Spike Art Magazine. Accessed August 2, 2018: https://www.spikeartmagazine.com/en/articles/monica-bonvicini-you-have-something-under-your-belt-and-something-over-your-head-and-you
- Massimiliano Gioni. "Monica Bonvicini. Destroy She Says" Flash Art. Accessed August 2, 2018: https://www.flashartonline.com/article/monica-bonvicini/
- Alexander Alberro, Janet Kraynak and Juliane Rebentisch, Monica Bonvicini, Phaidon Press, London, 2014.
- Art Agenda. "Monica Bonvicini – She Lies in Oslo." 2011. Accessed March 11, 2017. http://www.art-agenda.com/shows/monica-bonvicini-she-lies-in-oslo/.
- BALTIC Centre for Contemporary Art . "Monica Bonvicini." Accessed February 2017. http://www.balticmill.com/whats-on/monica-bonvicini
- Dan Cameron and Susanne von Falkenhausen, Monica Bonvicini, Hopefulmonster, Turin, 2000.
- Harald Falkenberg, Susanne Titz and Bettina Steinbrügge, Monica Bonvicini: Disegni, Distanz, Berlin, 2012.
- Jane Harris. "Monica Bonvicini." Art Forum, 2003, Accessed February 2017. https://www.artforum.com/index.php?pn=interview&id=1061
- Jan Verwoert, Matthias Mühling and Nikola Dietrich, Monica Bonvicini, DuMont, Cologne, 2009.
- Jonas Marx. "Monica Bonvicini – She Lies in Oslo." Art Agenda. 2010. Accessed February 2017. http://www.art-agenda.com/shows/monica-bonvicini-she-lies-in-oslo/.
- The Museum of Modern Art. "Monica Bonvicini | Artist.". Accessed February 2017. https://www.moma.org/artists/28568
- Monica Bonvicini. "Monica Bonvicini." Accessed February 2017. http://monicabonvicini.net/.
- The Telegraph. "Olympic Park artwork is up and running." The Telegraph. January 13, 2012. Accessed March 15, 2017. https://www.telegraph.co.uk/sport/olympics/london-2012-festival/9013345/Olympic-Park-artwork-is-up-and-running.html.
- Vanessa Joan Müller and Ursula Maria Probst, Monica Bonvicini: BOTH ENDS, Verlag der Buchhandlung Walther König, Cologne, 2010

== Works ==
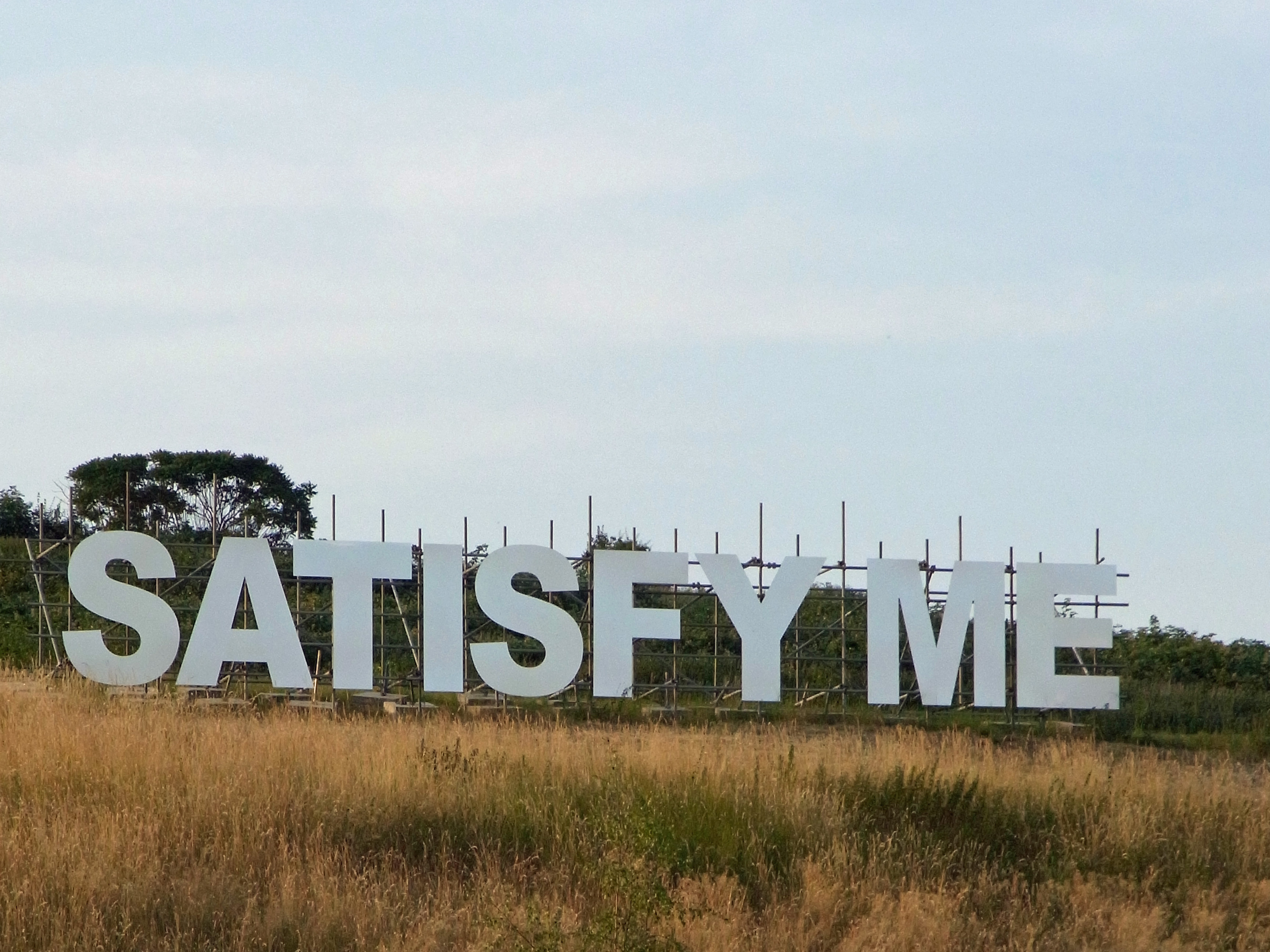
Satisfy Me, 2010

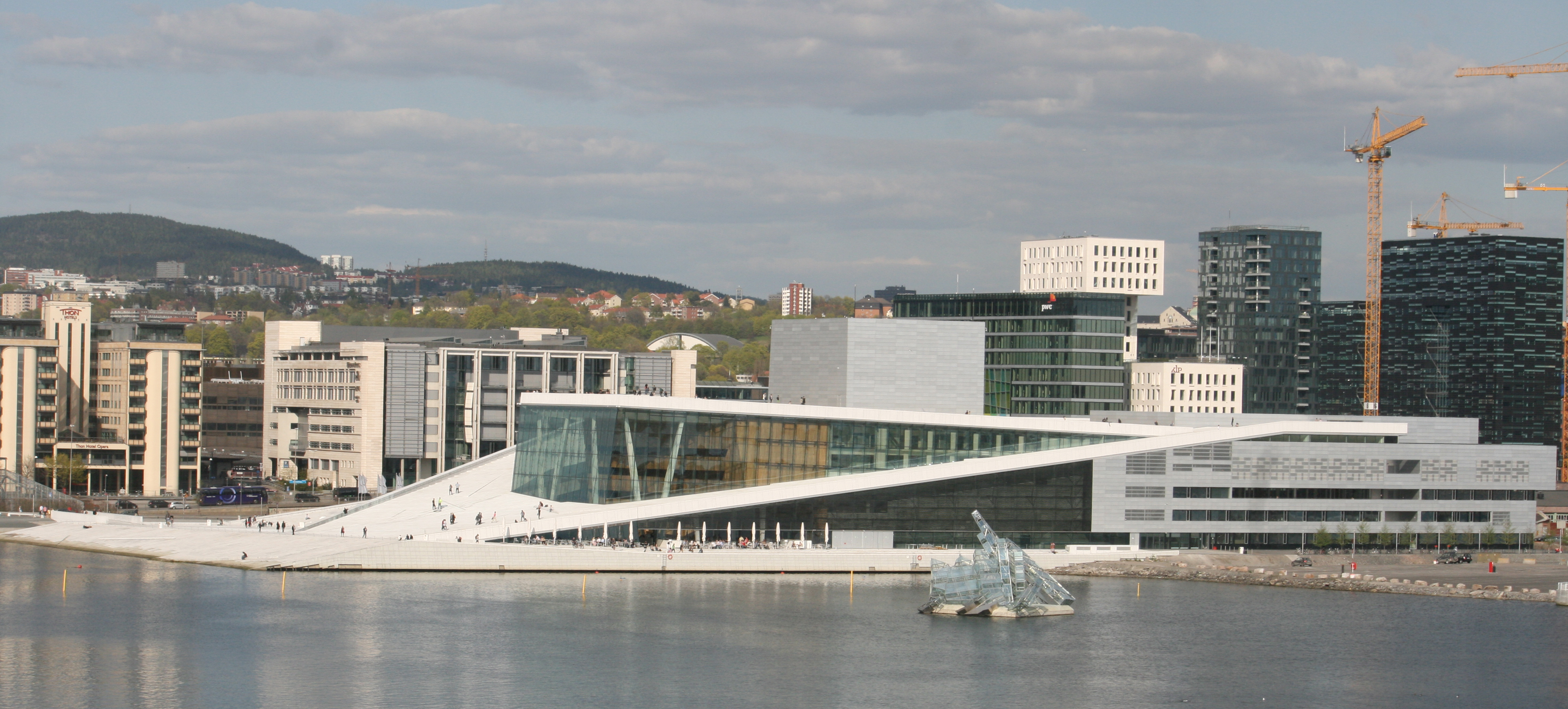
She Lies, 2010
