= She Lies =

Public sculpture by Monica Bonvicini in Norway

Coordinates: 59.9064°N 10.7507°E

She Lies, 2010

She Lies is a public sculpture by Monica Bonvicini made of stainless steel and glass panels, measuring approximately 12 metres (39 ft) by 17 metres (56 ft) by 16 metres (52 ft), next to the Oslo Opera House in Norway.

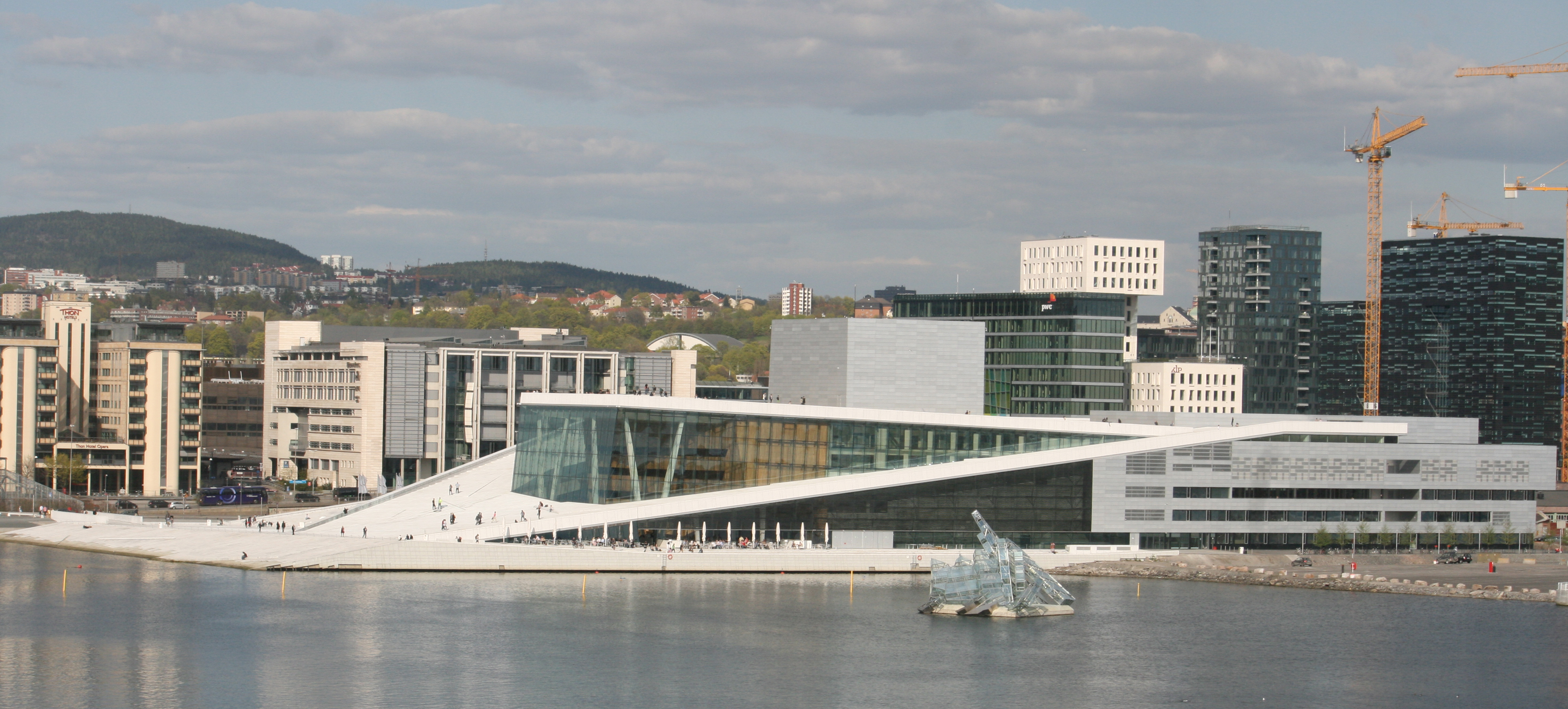
The sculpture with Oslo Opera House in the background

It is a permanent installation, floating on the water in the fjord on a concrete platform, rising 12 metres (39 ft) above the water surface. The sculpture turns on its axis in line with the tide and wind, offering changing experiences through reflections from the water and its transparent surfaces.

== Artist ==
The sculpture was made by Bonvicini as a three-dimensional interpretation of Caspar David Friedrich's painting The Sea of Ice (Das Eismeer) (1823–1824). The massive mound of ice depicted acts as a symbol of power in the region. Bonvicini won an international competition in 2007 for She Lies. She stated:

The synthesis of structure/skin/ornament explore the interface between nature and culture, or that of a cultural artefact. While reconstructing a famous Romantic painting, the work represents in a visual striking way the shape of an iceberg, as if one would have, by circumstances due to the global warming, ended up in the fjord in front of the opera house.
