= Die gescheiterte Hoffnung =

Coordinates: 52.05493°N 10.37463°E

- Artist: Paul Isenrath
- Year: 1988
- Medium: road asphalt
- Location: Kniestedter Kirche, Salzgitter-Bad

Die gescheiterte Hoffnung – Hommage à Caspar David Friedrich (The Failed Hope – Homage to Caspar David Friedrich) was an asphalt sculpture created in 1988 by the German artist Paul Isenrath (born 1936). At the time, Isenrath was professor and rector of the Kunstakademie Münster (Münster Academy of Fine Arts). It was a work created as part of the art project "Kunst überall" ("Art Everywhere”), a sculpture project by the city of Salzgitter in southeastern Lower Saxony.

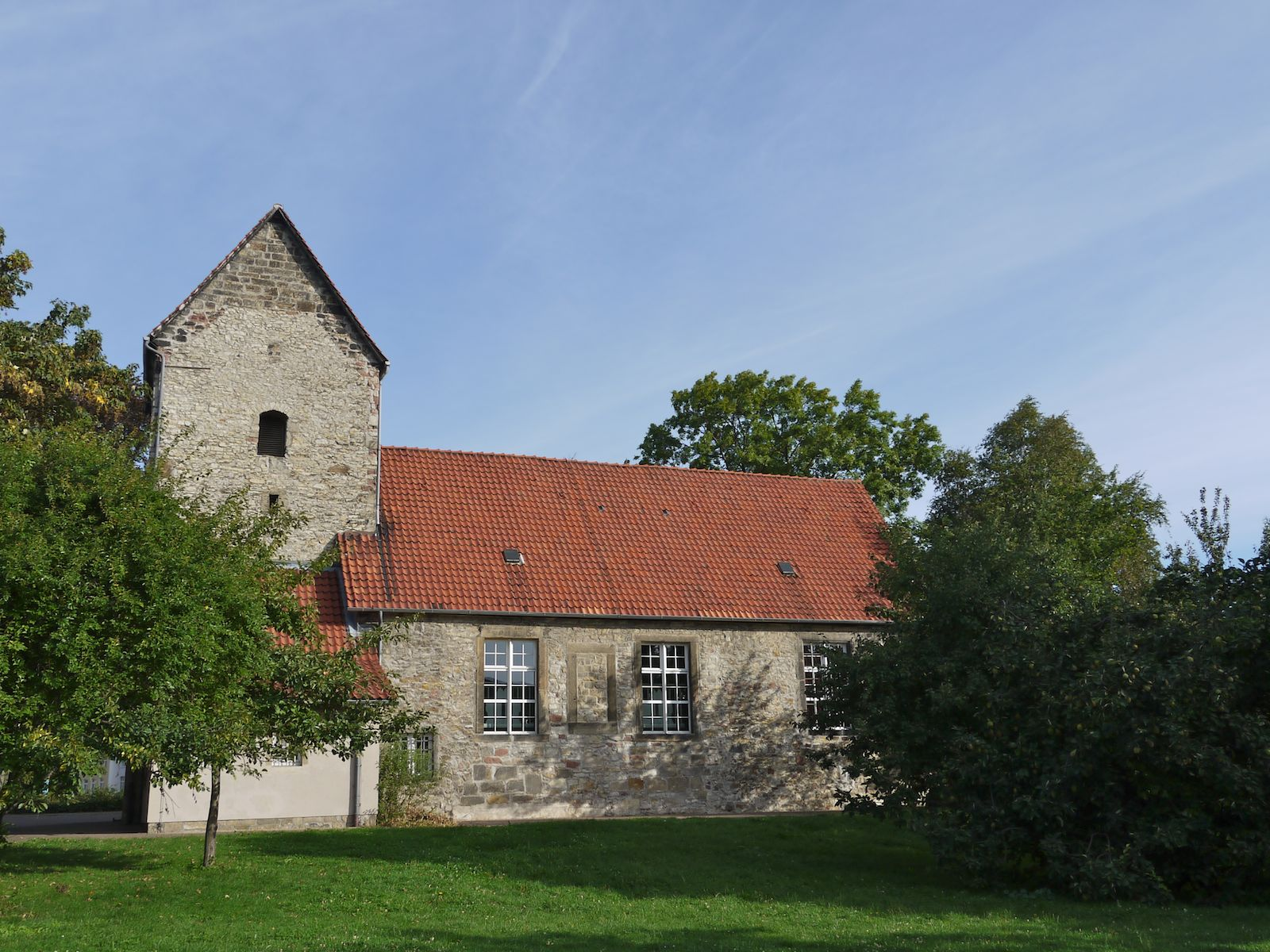
Kniestedter Kirche in Salzgitter-Bad (former location)

The sculpture consisted of layers of broken road asphalt arranged around a compass in the middle. It was installed in Salzgitter-Bad, Germany, near the Kniestedt Church, a former Evangelical Lutheran church building that has been used as a venue for small-scale arts and cultural events since 1985.

== Controversy and removal ==
The installation became controversial shortly after its completion. Two members of the local council from the Social Democratic Party (SPD) filed a legal complaint against the artwork. The sculpture was subsequently removed. Isenrath initially considered filing a claim for damages, but the dispute was ultimately settled by other means.

The debate surrounding the sculpture attracted nationwide attention in Germany and was discussed in major media outlets as an example of conflicts over public art.

== Reference to Caspar David Friedrich ==
As indicated by its subtitle, the work is a homage to the German Romantic painter Caspar David Friedrich (1774–1840). Friedrich's painting Das Eismeer (The Sea of Ice) (1823–1824) is also known by the subtitle The Failed Hope and depicts an Arctic landscape of towering ice floes crushing a ship, of which only parts of the stern and a broken mast remain visible.

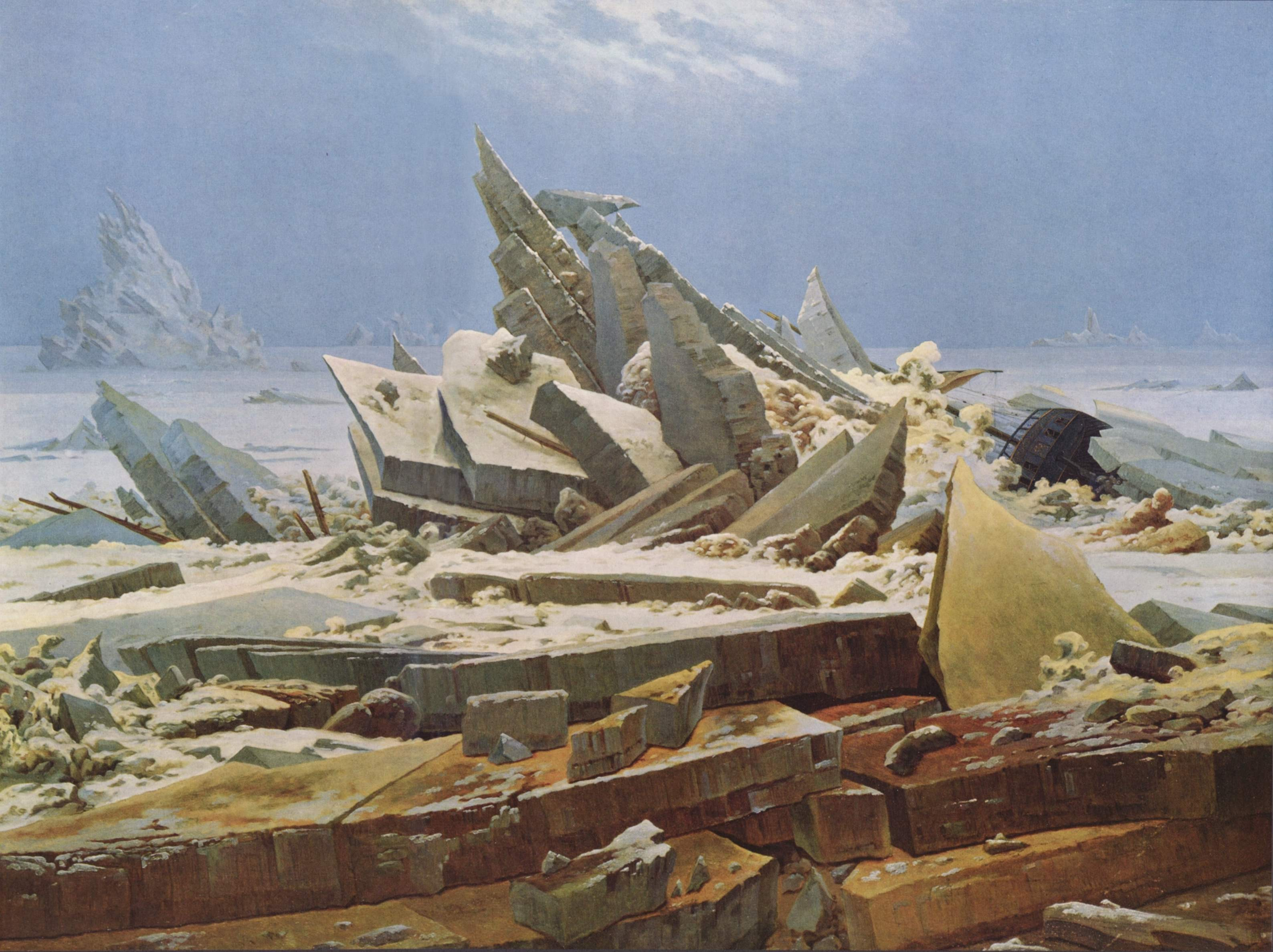
Caspar David Friedrich: The Sea of Ice (The Failed Hope), c. 1823–1824, Hamburger Kunsthalle

Isenrath's sculpture translates the motif of fractured, piled surfaces into an urban and contemporary material—road asphalt—thereby linking Romantic symbolism with modern political and social connotations.

== Cultural context ==
The work might also be associated with the slogan “Unter dem Pflaster liegt der Strand” (“Under/Beneath the Paving Stones, the Beach”), which was widely used in Germany's and other countries left-wing and countercultural movements of the 1970s. The phrase refers to the fact that street paving stones are often laid on sand and became symbolic during protests, where stones were sometimes used as weapons. The French version, Sous les pavés, la plage, attributed to the Situationist International, became famous during the Paris protests of May 1968. The slogan has also been referenced in music and popular culture.

== See also ==
- Unter dem Pflaster liegt der Strand (German)
