= Totes Meer =

1941 painting by Paul Nash

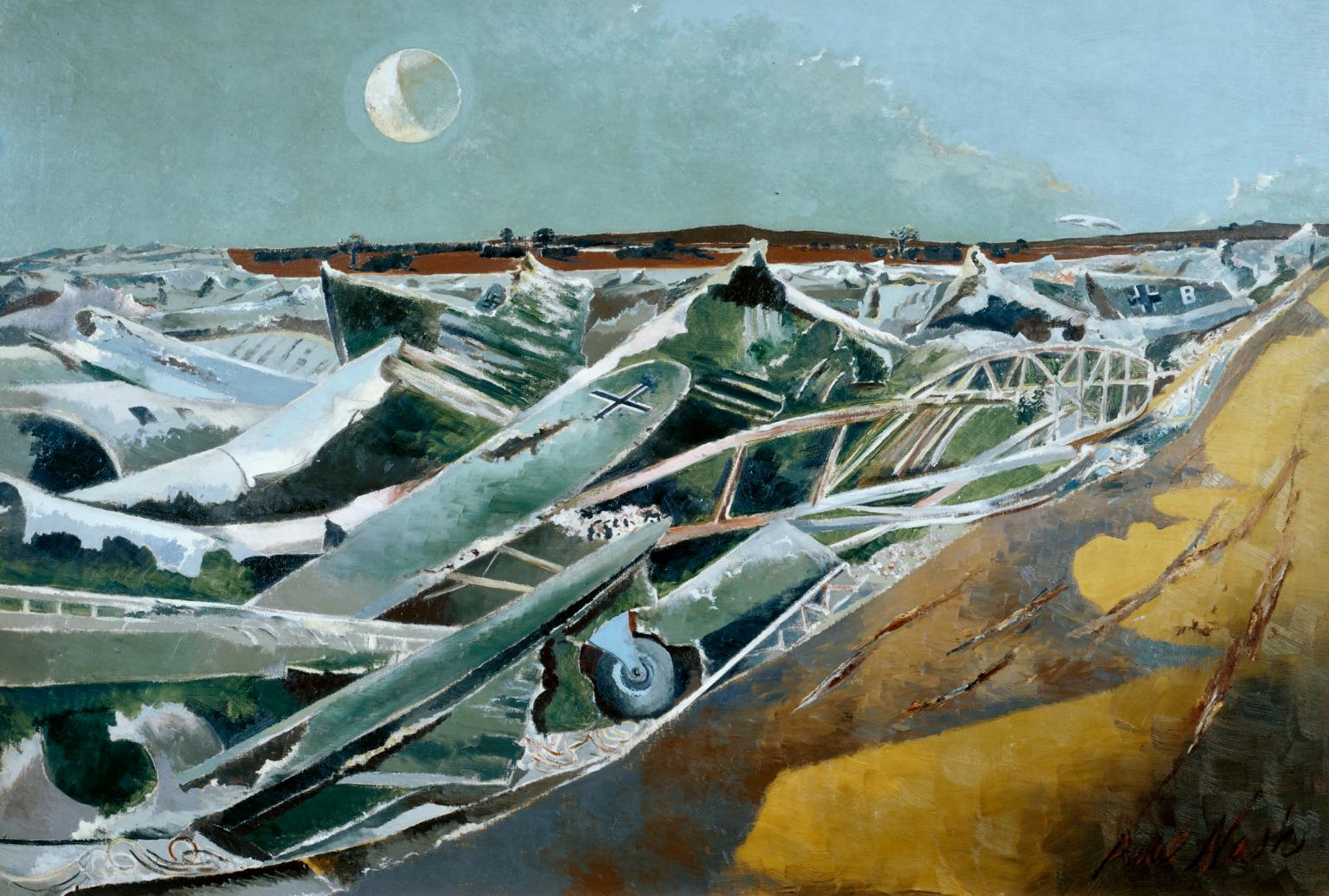
- Artist: Paul Nash
- Year: 1941
- Medium: Oil on canvas
- Dimensions: 40 cm × 60 cm (16 in × 24 in)
- Location: Tate Gallery; London

Totes Meer (German: Dead Sea) is a 1941 painting by Paul Nash. It depicts a moonlit landscape populated by a graveyard of crashed aircraft of the German Luftwaffe. The broken shards of metal from the wings and fuselages resemble a seascape of jagged ice, possibly inspired by Caspar David Friedrich's The Sea of Ice. It measures 40.0 × 60.0 inches (102 × 152 cm) and has been in the collection of the Tate Gallery, since 1946.

== Background ==
Paul Nash was an official war artist in the First and Second World Wars. In 1940, he was asked to work for the Air Ministry, and Nash started work on Totes Meer that year. Some representatives of the Air Ministry disliked his style of art, and his full-time position was terminated before the end of the year. Totes Meer was completed in 1941, and offered to the War Artists' Advisory Committee in 1941. Nash was paid £150 for the painting.

== Description ==
The work was based on sketches and photographs made at the Metal and Produce Recovery Unit at Cowley near Oxford in August 1940, where the remains of both German and British crashed aircraft were brought to be recycled at the Morris Motors car factory nearby, which was being used to construct and repair aircraft. Nash wrote that, under moonlight, the sea of wreckage could be perceived to move and twist, but in reality it was of course dead, and the only movement was the flight of a white owl, depicted near the horizon at the right.

The desolate landscape harkens back to the paintings that Nash made as a war artist in the First World War, such as We are Making a New World or The Menin Road. The mournful tone may also have been influenced by his personal circumstances: an affair with painter Eileen Agar was coming to an end, and Nash was suffering from a respiratory illness which ultimately caused his death.

Nash initially called the work Iron Sea, but he hoped that the work could be reproduced on postcards to be sent to Germany as propaganda and decided on a German title instead. Nash described his painting:

The thing (the salvage dump) looked to me, suddenly, like a great inundating sea. You might feel – under certain circumstances – a moonlight night, for instance, this is a vast tide moving across the fields, the breakers rearing up and crashing on the plain. And then, no, nothing moves, it is not water or even ice, it is something static and dead. It is metal piled up, wreckage. It is hundreds and hundreds of flying creatures which invaded these shores (how many Nazi planes have been shot down or otherwise wrecked in this country since they first invaded?). Well, here they are, or some of them. By moonlight, the waning moon, one could swear they began to move and twist and turn as they did in the air. A sort of rigor mortis? No, they are quite dead and still. The only moving creature is the white owl flying low over the bodies of the other predatory creatures, raking the shadows for rats and voles. She isn’t there, of course, as a symbol quite so much as the form and colour essential just there to link up with the cloud fringe overhead.

== Reception ==
Kenneth Clark, chairman of the War Artists' Advisory Committee, described Totes Meer as "the best war picture so far" and the painting was an immediate success when it was displayed in an exhibition of National War Pictures at the National Gallery in May 1941. It was presented to the Tate Gallery in 1946 and is considered to be one of the most important British paintings of the Second World War.
