= Paul Nash (artist) =

English Surrealist painter (1889–1946)

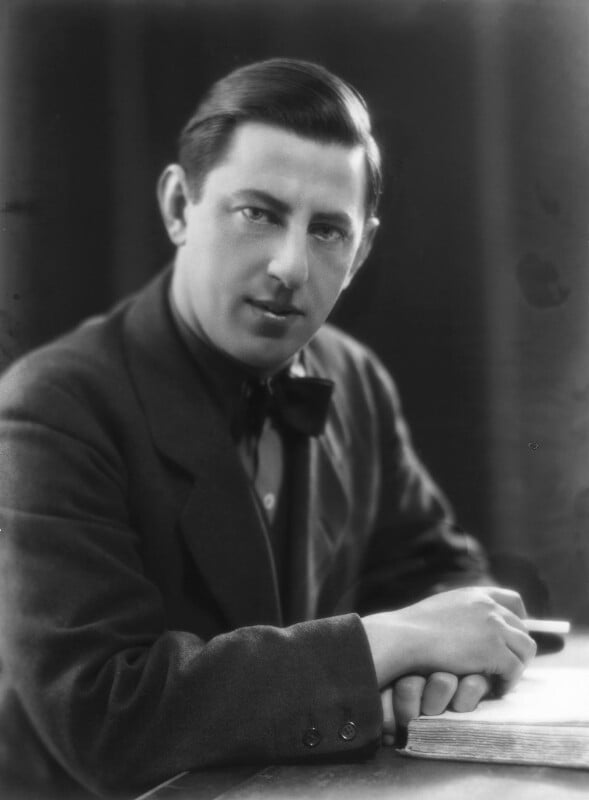
- Nash in 1922
- Born: 11 May 1889; Kensington, London, England
- Died: 11 July 1946 (aged 57); Boscombe, Dorset, England
- Education: South-Western Polytechnic; London County Council School of Photo-engraving and Lithography; Slade School of Art
- Known for: Painting, printmaking
- Movement: Surrealism
- Spouse: Margaret Theodosia Odeh (m. 1914–1946)
- Family: John Nash (brother)

Paul Nash (11 May 1889 – 11 July 1946) was a British surrealist painter and war artist, as well as a photographer, writer and designer of applied art. Nash was among the most important landscape artists of the first half of the twentieth century. He played a key role in the development of modernism in English art.

Born in London, Nash grew up in Buckinghamshire where he developed a love of the landscape. He entered the Slade School of Art but was poor at figure drawing and concentrated on landscape painting. Nash found much inspiration in landscapes with elements of ancient history, such as burial mounds, Iron Age hill forts such as Wittenham Clumps and the standing stones at Avebury in Wiltshire. The artworks he produced during World War I are among the most iconic images of the conflict. After the war Nash continued to focus on landscape painting, originally in a formalized, decorative style but, throughout the 1930s, in an increasingly abstract and surreal manner. In his paintings he often placed everyday objects into a landscape to give them a new identity and symbolism.

During World War II, although sick with the asthmatic condition that would kill him, he produced two series of anthropomorphic depictions of aircraft, before producing a number of landscapes rich in symbolism with an intense mystical quality. These have perhaps become among the best known works from the period. Nash was also a fine book illustrator, and designed stage scenery, fabrics and posters.

He was the elder brother of the artist John Nash.

== Early life ==
Nash was the son of a successful barrister, William Harry Nash, and his wife Caroline Maude, the daughter of a captain in the Royal Navy. He was born in Kensington and grew up in Earl's Court in West London, but in 1902 the family moved to Iver Heath in Buckinghamshire. It was hoped the move to the countryside would help Caroline Nash, who was increasingly showing symptoms of mental illness. The growing cost of Caroline Nash's treatment led to the house at Iver Heath being rented out while Paul and his father lived together in lodgings and his younger sister and brother went to boarding schools. On Valentine's Day 1910, aged forty-nine, Caroline Nash died in a mental institution.

Paul Nash was originally intended for a career in the Navy, following the path of his maternal grandfather, but despite additional training at a specialist school in Greenwich, he failed the Naval Entrance Examination and returned to finish his schooling at St Paul's School. Encouraged by a fellow student at St Paul's, Eric Kennington, Nash considered the possibility of a career as an artist. After studying for a year at the South-Western Polytechnic in Chelsea, he then enrolled at the London County Council School of Photo-engraving and Lithography, in Bolt Court off Fleet Street, in the autumn of 1908. Nash spent two years studying at Bolt Court, where he began to write poetry and plays and where his work was spotted and praised by Selwyn Image. He was advised by his friend, the poet Gordon Bottomley, and by the artist William Rothenstein, that he should attend the Slade School of Art at University College, London. He enrolled in October 1910, though he later recorded that on his first meeting with the Professor of Drawing, Henry Tonks, 'It was evident he considered that neither the Slade, nor I, were likely to derive much benefit'.

The Slade was then opening its doors to a remarkable crop of young talents – what Tonks later described as the school's second and last 'Crisis of Brilliance'. Nash's fellow students included Ben Nicholson, Stanley Spencer, Mark Gertler, William Roberts, Dora Carrington, C. R. W. Nevinson, David Bomberg and Edward Wadsworth. Nash struggled with figure drawing, and spent only a year at the school. Nash had shows in 1912 and 1913, sometimes with his brother John, largely devoted to drawings and watercolours of brooding landscapes, influenced by the poetry of William Blake and the paintings of Samuel Palmer and Dante Gabriel Rossetti.

Two locations in particular featured in his landscape work at this time, the view from his father's house in Iver Heath and a pair of tree-topped hills in the Thames Valley known as the Wittenham Clumps. These were the first in a series of locations, which would eventually include Ypres, Dymchurch, the Romney Marshes, Avebury and Swanage, that would inspire Nash in his landscape paintings throughout his life. By the summer of 1914 Nash was enjoying some success and during that year he worked briefly at the Omega Workshops under Roger Fry and also worked with him on restoring the Mantegna cartoons at Hampton Court Palace. He was elected to The London Group in 1914.

== World War I ==
=== Army officer ===
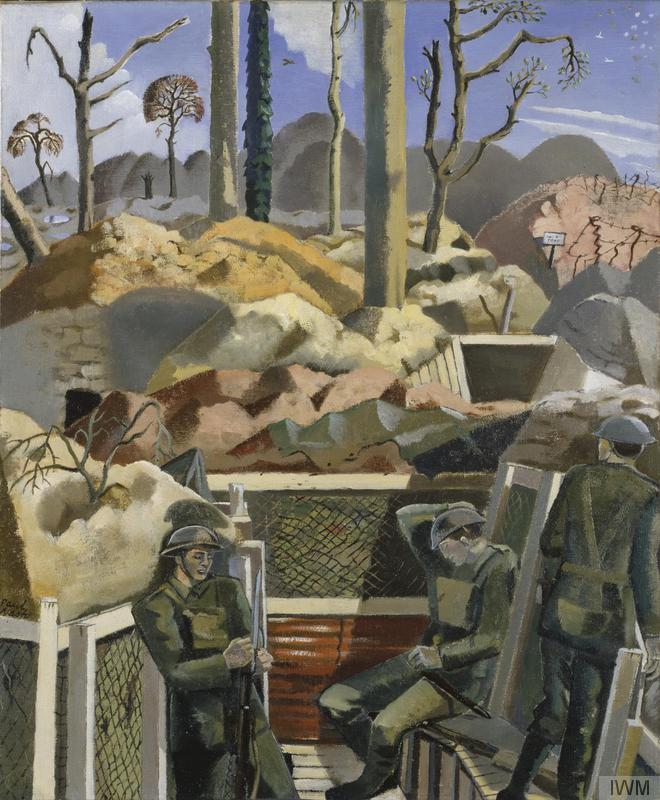
Spring in the Trenches, Ridge Wood, 1917 (1918), collection of the Imperial War Museum, London

On 10 September 1914, shortly after the start of World War I, Nash reluctantly enlisted in the Territorial Force as a private for home service. Initially he served with the Artists' Rifles, formally the 28th (County of London) Battalion of the London Regiment. Nash's duties, which included guard duty at the Tower of London, allowed him time to continue drawing and painting.

In December 1914 Nash married Jerusalem-born Margaret Theodosia Odeh, an Oxford-educated campaigner for Women's Suffrage, at St Martin-in-the-Fields, Trafalgar Square. Her father, Revd Naser Odeh, who was born in Palestine and educated at Monkton Combe School, had been the founding priest in charge of St Mary's Mission and the pro-cathedral, Cairo. Margaret was naturalised British in 1912. The couple had no children.

Nash began officer training in August 1916 and was sent to the Western Front in February 1917 as a second lieutenant in the Hampshire Regiment. He was based at Saint-Eloi on the Ypres Salient at a relatively quiet time and although the area did come under shelling, no major engagements took place while he was there. Whilst clearly aware of the destruction that had taken place there, he was delighted to see that, with spring arriving, the landscape was recovering from the damage inflicted on it. However, on the night of 25 May 1917, Nash fell into a trench, broke a rib and, by 1 June, had been invalided back to London. A few days later the majority of his former unit were killed in an assault on a position known as Hill 60. Nash considered himself lucky to be alive. While recuperating in London, Nash worked from sketches he had done at the Front to produce a series of twenty drawings, mostly in ink, chalk and watercolours, of the war. Whilst some of these pieces showed the influence of the Vorticist movement and their manifesto, the literary magazine BLAST, the majority concerned the spring landscape and were similar in tone to his pre-war work. Chaos Decoratif, for example, shows part of a trench and a shattered tree amid a scene of almost pastoral calm. The collection was well received when exhibited in June that year at the Goupil Gallery. A further exhibition of these drawings was held in Birmingham in September 1917. As a result of these exhibitions, C. R. W. Nevinson advised Nash to approach Charles Masterman, head of the government's War Propaganda Bureau, to apply to become an official war artist. Nash was with a reserve battalion near Portsmouth, preparing to return to France in a combat role, when he received word that his commission as a war artist had been approved.

=== Official war artist – Belgium, 1917 ===
In November 1917 Nash returned to the Ypres Salient as a uniformed observer with a batman and chauffeur. At this point the Third Battle of Ypres was three months old and Nash himself frequently came under shellfire after arriving in Flanders. The winter landscape he found was very different from the one he had last seen in spring. The system of ditches, small canals and dykes which usually drained the Ypres landscape had been all but destroyed by the constant shellfire. Months of incessant rain had led to widespread flooding and mile upon mile of deep mud. Nash was outraged at this desecration of nature. He believed the landscape was no longer capable of supporting life nor could it recover when spring came. Nash quickly grew angry and disillusioned with the war and made this clear in letters written to his wife. One such written, after a pointless meeting at Brigade HQ, on 16 November 1917 stands out,

I have just returned, last night from a visit to Brigade Headquarters up the line and I shall not forget it as long as I live. I have seen the most frightful nightmere of a country more conceived by Dante or Poe than by nature, unspeakable, utterly indescribable. In the fifteen drawings I have made I may give you some idea of its horror, but only being in it and of it can ever make you sensible of its dreadful nature and of what our men in France have to face. We all have a vague notion of the terrors of a battle, and can conjure up with the aid of some of the more inspired war correspondents and the pictures in the Daily Mirror some vision of battlefield; but no pen or drawing can convey this country—the normal setting of the battles taking place day and night, month after month. Evil and the incarnate fiend alone can be master of this war, and no glimmer of God's hand is seen anywhere. Sunset and sunrise are blasphemous, they are mockeries to man, only the black rain out of the bruised and swollen clouds all through the bitter black night is fit atmosphere in such a land. The rain drives on, the stinking mud becomes more evilly yellow, the shell holes fill up with green-white water, the roads and tracks are covered in inches of slime, the black dying trees ooze and sweat and the shells never cease. They alone plunge overhead, tearing away the rotting tree stumps, breaking the plank roads, striking down horses and mules, annihilating, maiming, maddening, they plunge into the grave, and cast up on it the poor dead. It is unspeakable, godless, hopeless. I am no longer an artist interested and curious, I am a messenger who will bring back word from the men who are fighting to those who want the war to go on for ever. Feeble, inarticulate, will be my message, but it will have a bitter truth, and may it burn their lousy souls."

Nash's anger was a great creative stimulus which led him to produce up to a dozen drawings a day. He worked in a frenzy of activity and took great risks to get as close as possible to the frontline trenches. Despite the dangers and hardship, when the opportunity came to extend his visit by a week and work for the Canadians in the Vimy sector, Nash jumped at the chance. He eventually returned to England on 7 December 1917.

=== Official war artist – England, 1918 ===
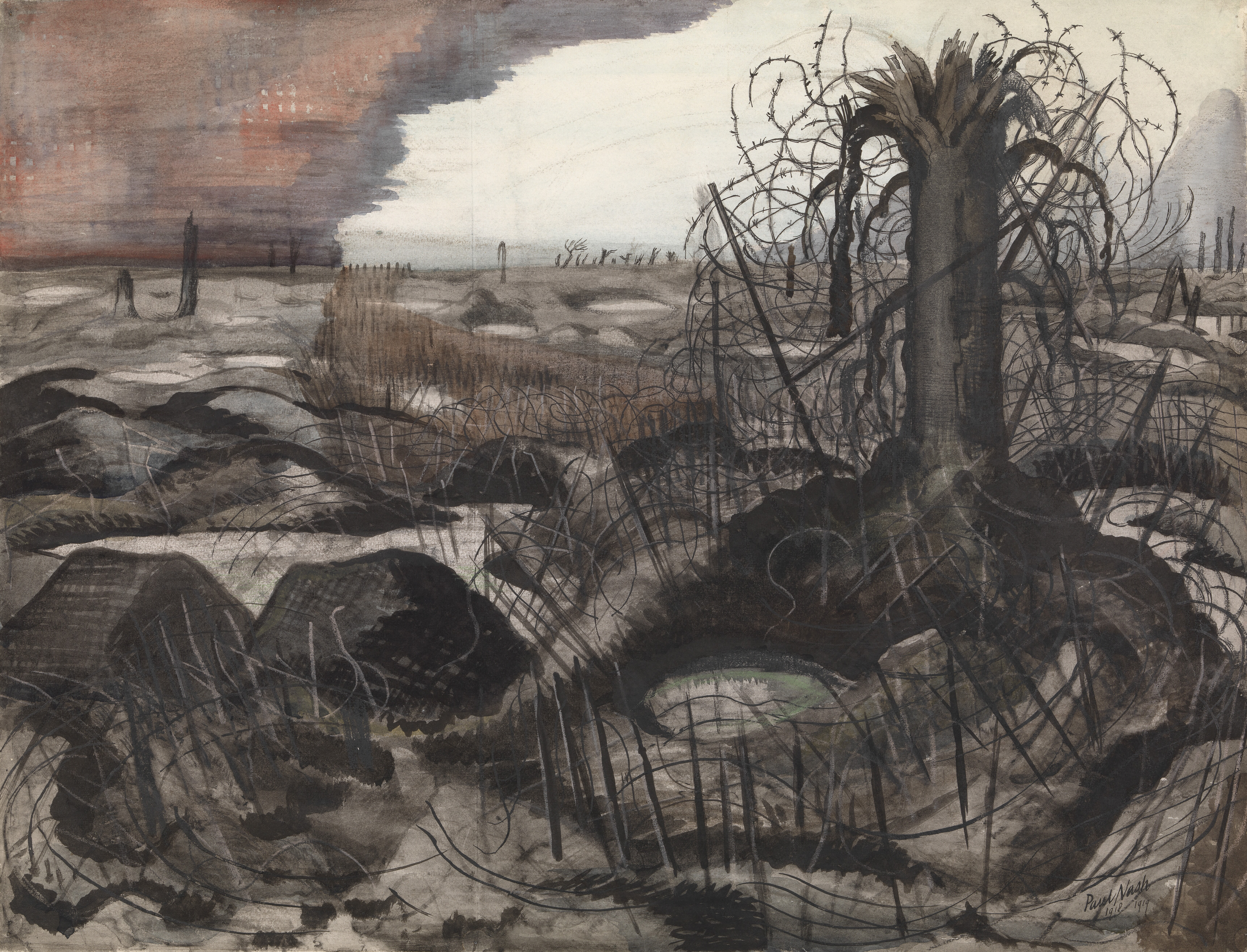
Wire (1919), collection of the Imperial War Museum, London

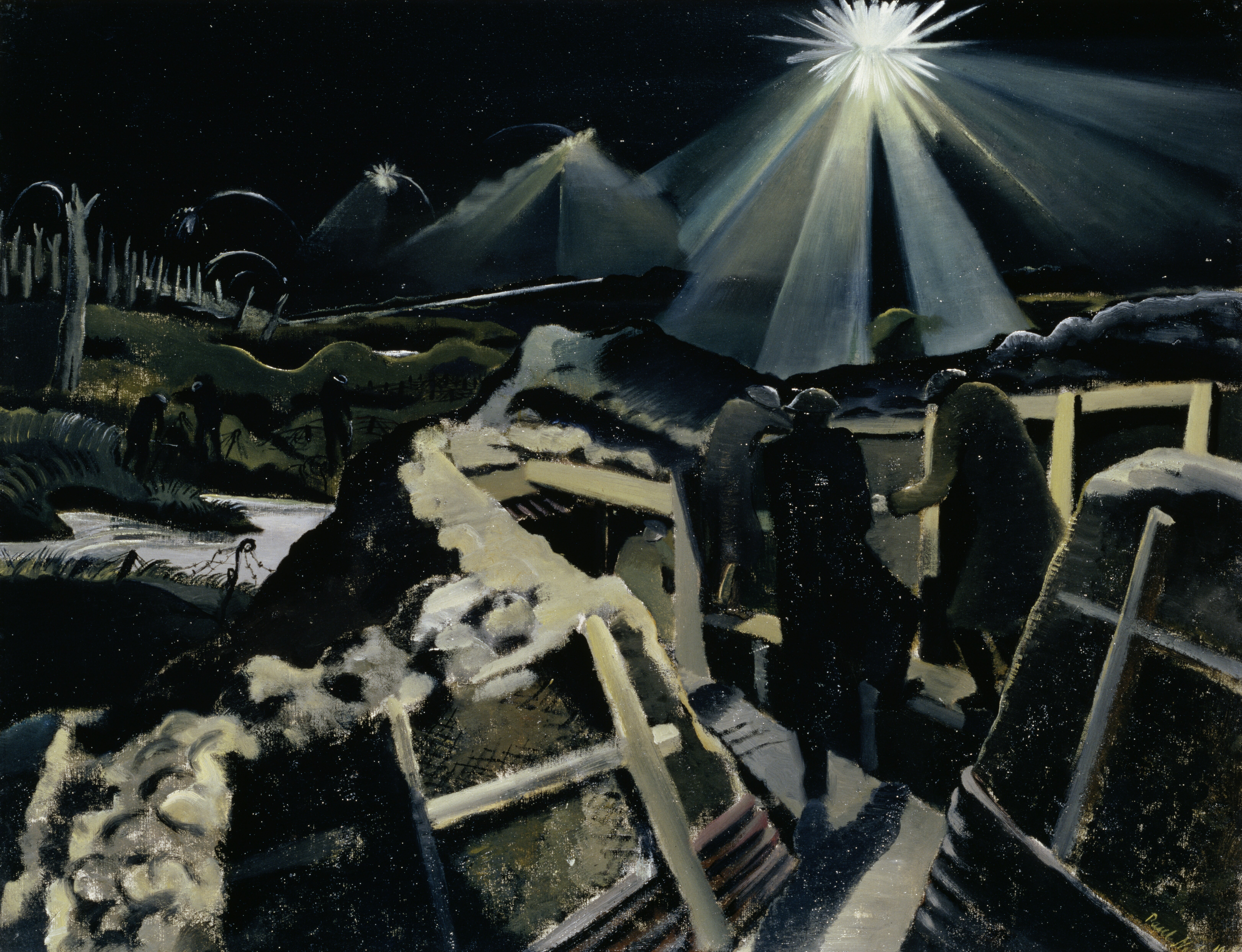
The Ypres Salient at Night (1918), collection of the Imperial War Museum, London

In six weeks on the Western Front, Nash completed what he called "fifty drawings of muddy places". When he returned to England, he started to develop these drawings into finished pieces and began working flat-out to have enough pictures ready for a one-man show in May 1918. While in Flanders Nash had mostly worked in pen-and-ink, often over painted in watercolours, but in England he learnt, from Nevinson, to produce lithographs. The 1917 drawing Nightfall, Zillebecke District showing soldiers walking along a zig-zagging duckboard became the 1918 lithograph Rain. After the Battle shows a battlefield, deserted save for some corpses sinking into the mud. The Landscape – Hill 60 shows fields of mud and shellholes with explosions filling the sky above. One of the largest and most powerful new drawings was Wire, originally titled Wire-The Hindenburg Line and again uses the destruction of nature, in the form of a tree trunk wrapped in barbed wire, akin to a crown of thorns, to represent the catastrophe of war.

Early in 1918, Nash began working in oils for the first time. The first oil painting he made was The Mule Track in which, amidst explosions from a bombardment, are the tiny figures of soldiers trying to stop their pack animals charging away along another zig-zagging duckboard. Switching to oils allowed Nash to make far greater use of colour and the explosions in The Mule Track contain yellow, orange and mustard shades. The canvas The Ypres Salient at Night captures the disorientation caused by the changes in direction of the defensive trenches at the Front, which Nash would have been familiar with, and which was exacerbated at night by the constant explosion of shells and flares.

Whilst in France Nash had made a pen-and-ink drawing he called Sunrise, Inverness Copse. Inverness Copse was the site of heavy fighting in the summer of 1917 during the Battle of Langemarck, part of the Third Battle of Ypres and Nash depicts the aftermath of the fighting, showing a landscape consisting of mud and blasted trees illuminated by a pale yellow Sun. Early in 1918, when Nash decided to produce a larger oil painting based on this drawing, whatever little hope that pale Sun represented had vanished. The bitter title, We are Making a New World, clearly mocks the ambitions of the war but is also a more universal reference than the previous title and represents a scene of devastation that could be anywhere on the Western Front. There are no people in the picture nor any of the details of, for example, The Mule Track to distract from the broken tree stumps, shellholes and mounds of earth. The Sun is a cold white orb and the brown clouds of the original drawing have become blood red. One modern critic, writing in 1994, likened it to a 'nuclear winter' whilst one of the first people to see it in 1918, Arthur Lee, the official censor responsible for the British war artists, thought it was a 'joke' at the expense of the public and the art establishment.

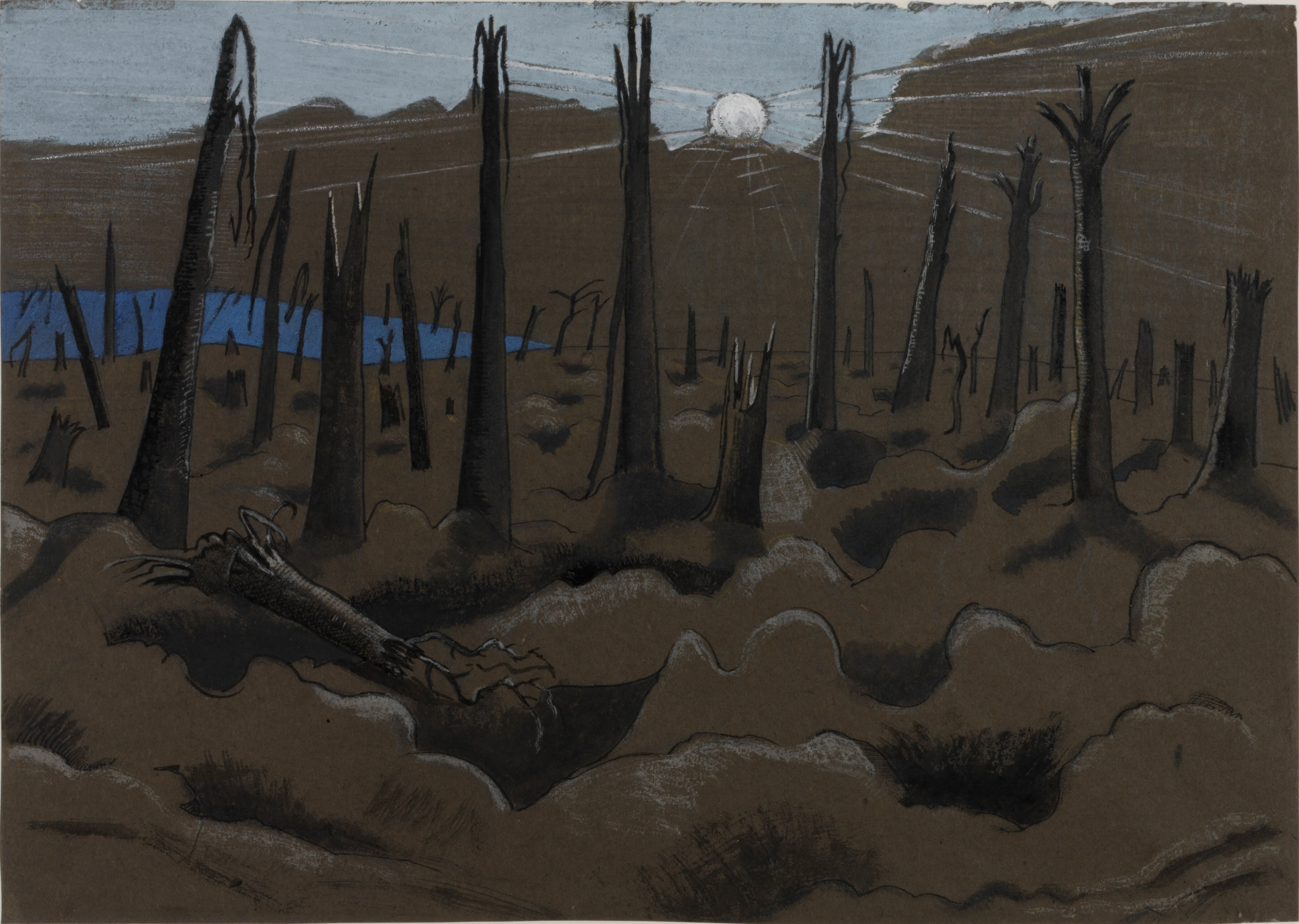
Sunrise, Inverness Copse (1917), collection of the Imperial War Museum, London

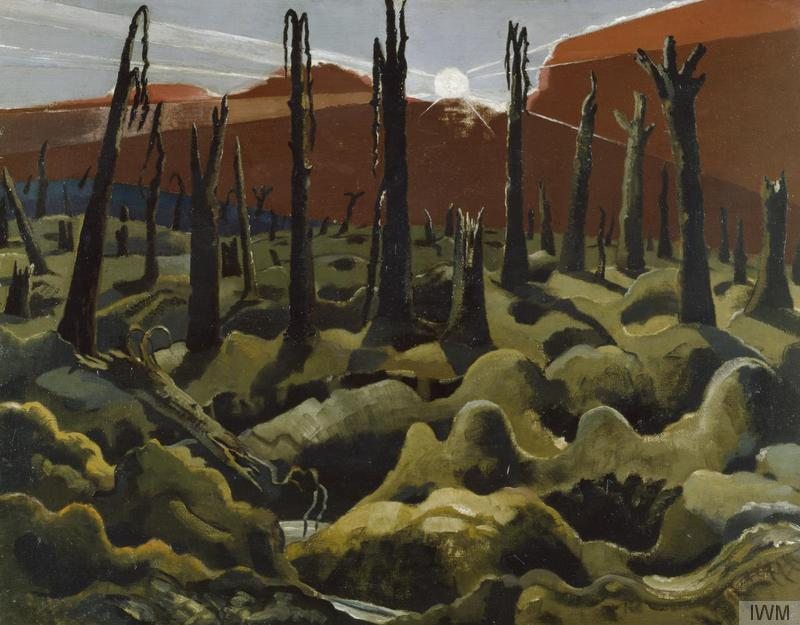
We Are Making a New World (1918), collection of the Imperial War Museum, London

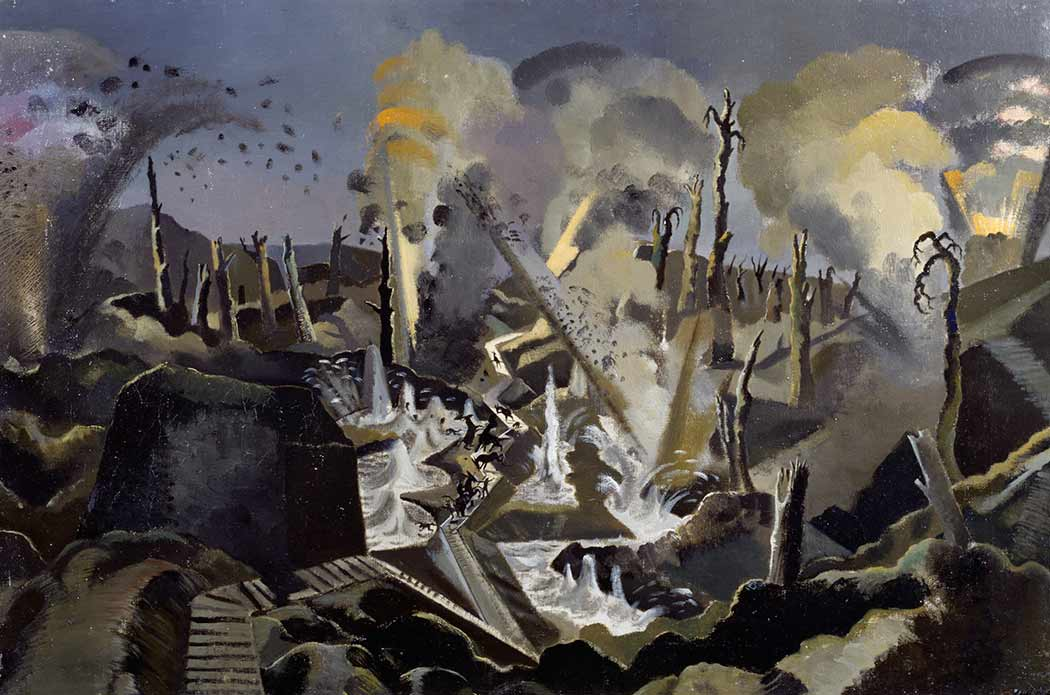
The Mule Track (1918), collection of the Imperial War Museum, London

These new works, alongside the 1917 pieces and some other works such as Mackerel Sky, were exhibited in Nash's solo exhibition entitled The Void of War at the Leicester Galleries in May 1918. This exhibition was critically acclaimed with most commentators focusing on how Nash had portrayed nature, in the form of devastated woods, fields and hillsides, as the innocent victim of the war.

=== The Menin Road ===
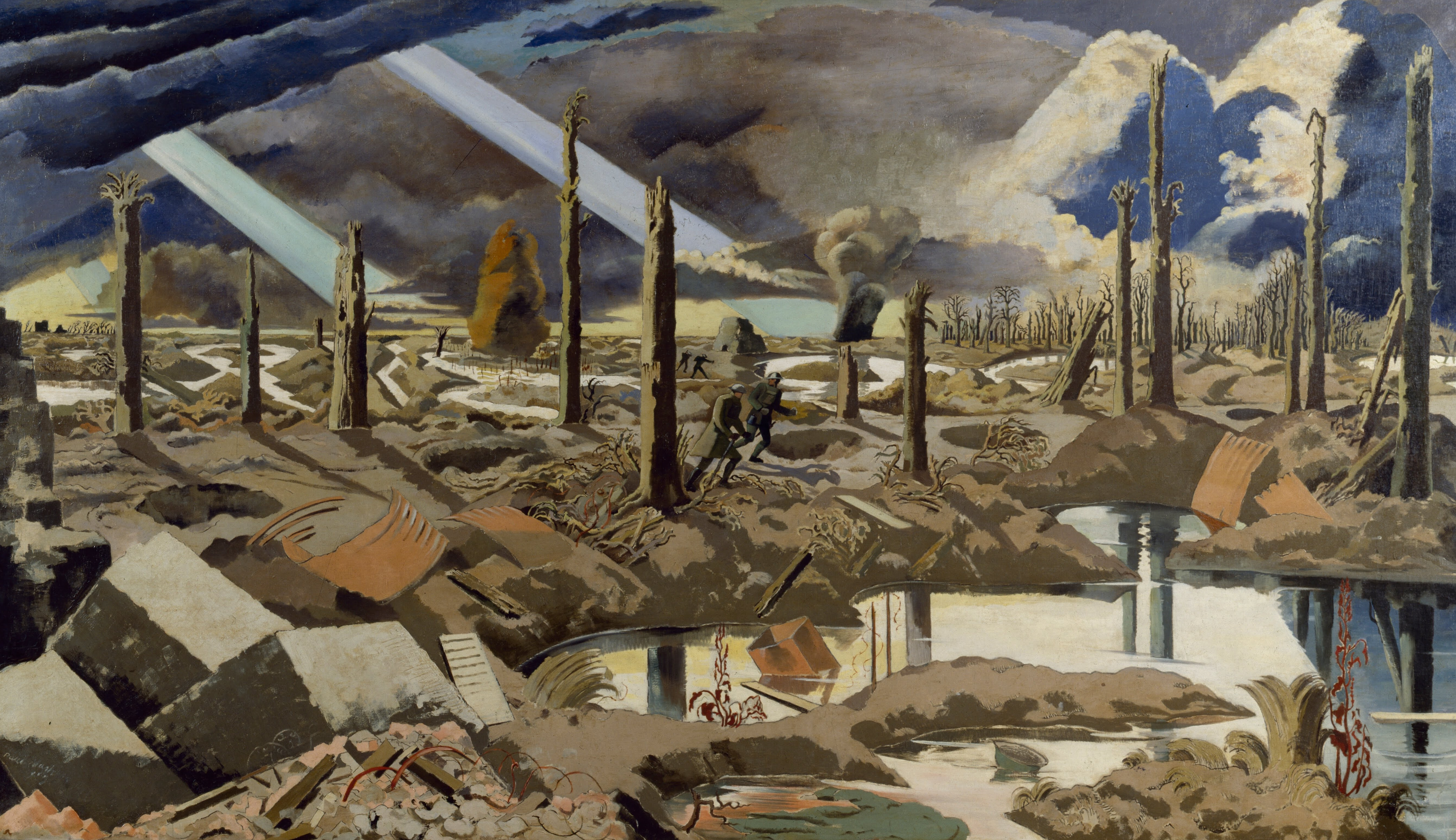
The Menin Road (1919), collection of the Imperial War Museum, London

In April 1918 Nash was commissioned by the British War Memorials Committee to paint a battlefield scene for the Hall of Remembrance project. He chose to depict a section of the Ypres Salient known as 'Tower Hamlets' that had been devastated during the Battle of the Menin Road Ridge. Once his work for the Void of War exhibition was complete in June 1918, Nash started painting the huge canvas, now known as The Menin Road, which was almost 60 square feet (5.6 m^{2}) in size, at Chalfont St Peter in Buckinghamshire using a herb-drying shed as his studio. He completed the piece in February 1919 in London. The picture depicts a maze of flooded trenches and shell craters while tree stumps, devoid of any foliage, point towards a sky full of clouds and plumes of smoke bisected by shafts of sunlight resembling gun barrels. Two soldiers at the centre of the picture attempt to follow the now unrecognisable road itself but appear to be trapped by the landscape.

== 1920s ==
When the war ended Nash was determined to continue his career as an artist but struggled with periodic bouts of depression and money worries. Throughout 1919 and 1920 Nash lived in Buckinghamshire and in London where he made theatre designs for a play by J. M. Barrie. Along with several other artists, Nash became prominent in the Society of Wood Engravers and in 1920 was involved in its first exhibition. From 1920 until 1923 Nash taught, on an occasional basis, at the Cornmarket School of Art in Oxford.

=== Dymchurch and Iden ===
In 1921, after visiting his sick father, Nash collapsed and, after a week during which he repeatedly lost consciousness, was diagnosed as suffering from 'emotional shock' arising from the war. To aid his recovery, the Nashes moved to Dymchurch which they had first visited in 1919 and where he painted seascapes, the seawall and landscapes of Romney Marsh. The seawall at Dymchurch became a key location in Nash's work. The conflict between land and sea depicted in the seawall paintings at Dymchurch recalled elements of Nash's paintings on the Western Front and were also influenced by his grief at the death of his friend Claud Lovat Fraser in June 1921. In 1922, Nash produced Places, a volume of seven wood engravings for which he designed the cover, cut the lettering and wrote the text. At this time he also began painting floral still-lifes as well as continuing his landscape paintings, most notably with Chilterns under Snow in 1923. Throughout 1924 and 1925 Nash taught part-time at the Design School at the Royal College of Art, where his students included both Eric Ravilious and Edward Bawden. In 1924 he held a commercially successful exhibition at the Leicester Galleries. This allowed the Nashes to spend the winter near Nice and visit Florence and Pisa at the start of 1925 after which they moved home to Iden near Rye in Sussex. Iden and the Romney Marshes became the settings for a series of paintings by Nash, most notably Winter Sea painted in 1925 and reworked in 1937. In 1927 Nash was elected to the London Artists' Association and in 1928 held another successful exhibition of his paintings at the Leicester Galleries whilst an exhibition of his wood-engravings was held at the Redfern Gallery the same year. The Leicester Galleries exhibition was notable for showing Nash turning away from his popular landscapes and beginning to explore abstraction in his work.

This change in direction continued throughout 1929 and 1930 when Nash produced a number of innovative paintings,

- Landscape at Iden, with its seemingly unrelated objects placed beside each other amid strong architectural elements, showed the impression the 1928 London exhibition by the surrealist Giorgio de Chirico had made on Nash.
- Northern Adventure and Nostalgic Landscape, St Pancras Station both paintings of St Pancras Station seen through a lattice work of abstract elements, derived from the frame of an advertising hoarding.
- The paintings Coronilla (1929) and Opening (1931) both depict openings between spaces in an abstract and cubist manner through which trees or the sea can be seen. The earlier Lares is in a similar style.
- Nash completed Dead Spring in February 1929, immediately after the death of his father. The painting shows a dying pot plant on a window still surrounded by a lattice of geometrical shapes which include some draughtsman's tools. Like the painting Lares, Dead Spring is thought to show the influence on Nash of having seen the 1928 Giorgio de Chirico exhibition in London.

=== Other media ===
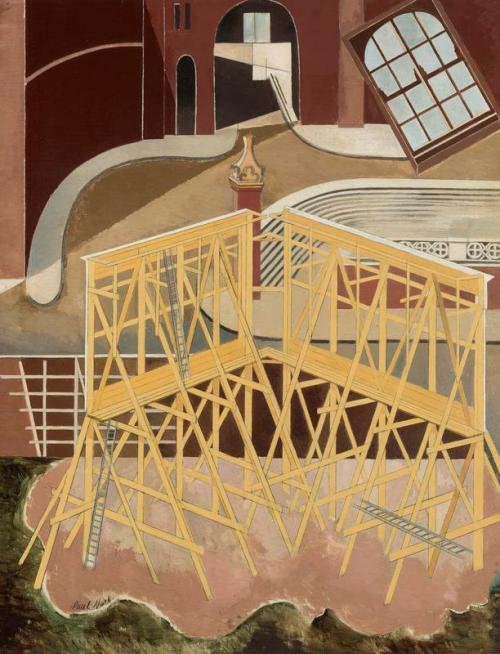
Northern Adventure, 1929, Aberdeen Archives, Gallery and Museums

Nash often worked in media other than paint. As well as two volumes of his own wood engravings, Places and Genesis, throughout the 1920s Nash produced highly regarded book illustrations for several authors, including Robert Graves and Siegfried Sassoon. Nash was one of the contributors of illustrations to the Subscriber's Edition of T. E. Lawrence's Seven Pillars of Wisdom, published in 1926. In 1930, Nash produced the dust jacket design for Roads to Glory, a collection of World War I stories by Richard Aldington.

In 1921 Nash displayed textile designs at an exhibition at Heal's and in 1925 developed four fabric designs for the Footprints series sold by Modern Textiles in London. Later still, in 1933, Brain & Co in Stoke-on-Trent commissioned Nash and other artists to produce designs for their Foley China range which was showcased at the Modern Art for the Table exhibition at Harrods. In 1931, Margaret Nash gave him a camera when he sailed to America to serve as a jury member at the Carnegie International Award in Pittsburgh. Nash became a prolific photographer and would often work from his own photographs alongside his preparatory sketches when painting a work.

By April 1928, Nash wanted to leave Iden but did not do so until after his father's death in February 1929, when he sold the family home in Iver Heath and bought a house in Rye.

== 1930s ==
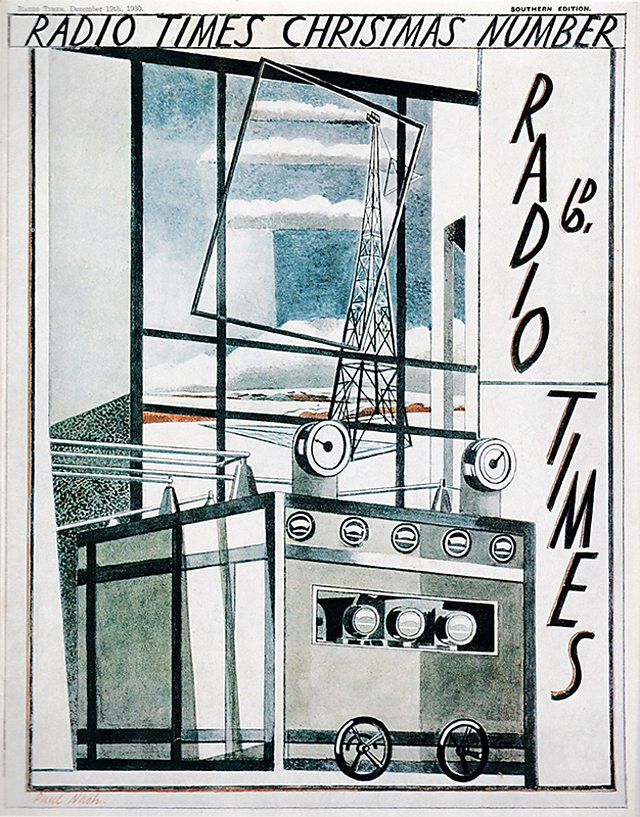
Nash's cover for the Radio Times' Christmas 1930 edition

In 1930 Nash started working as an art critic for The Listener, and in his writings acknowledged the influence of the 1928 Giorgio de Chirico London exhibition and of the modernist works he had seen during a visit to Paris in 1930 at Léonce Rosenberg's gallery. Nash became a pioneer of modernism in Britain, promoting the avant-garde European styles of abstraction and surrealism throughout the 1930s. In 1933 he co-founded the influential modern art movement Unit One with fellow artists Henry Moore, Barbara Hepworth, Ben Nicholson, Edward Wadsworth and the critic Herbert Read. It was a short-lived but important move towards the revitalisation of British art in the inter-war period.

=== Avebury ===
When in 1931 he was invited to illustrate a book of his own choice, Nash choose Sir Thomas Browne's Hydriotaphia, Urn Burial and The Garden of Cyrus, providing the publisher with a set of 30 illustrations to accompany Browne's discourses. For Hydriotaphia, Urn Burial Nash also produced six larger watercolours, including Mansions of the Dead, and three oil paintings on the book's themes of death and burial customs. These became significant themes for Nash when in July 1933 he went to Marlborough on holiday and visited Silbury Hill and Avebury for the first time. This ancient landscape with its neolithic monuments and standing stones "excited and fascinated" Nash and stirred "his sensitiveness to magic and the sinister beauty of monsters" according to Ruth Clarke who had accompanied him to Marlborough. Nash went on to paint the landscape at Avebury several times in different styles, most notably in his two 1934 paintings, Druid Landscape and Landscape of the Megaliths. The 1935 painting Equivalents for the Megaliths stresses the mystery of the site by portraying it in an abstract manner rather than a more literal depiction. Nash appears to have been unhappy with the restoration work, started in 1934, at Avebury by Alexander Keiller, seemingly preferring the previous wilder and more unkept appearance of the area.

Nash's father in law Naser Odeh died in Rye in 1932 and Nash was named an executor, together with his wife Margaret. Nash wanted to move to live in Wiltshire but instead he left Rye for London in November 1933 before the couple undertook a long trip to France, Gibraltar and North Africa. When they returned to England in June 1934, the Nashes rented a cottage on the Dorset coast near Swanage. Nash was asked by the poet John Betjeman to write a book in the Shell Guides series. Nash accepted and undertook writing a guide to Dorset.

=== Swanage ===
Between 1934 and 1936 Nash lived near Swanage in Dorset, hoping the sea air would ease his asthma whilst he worked on the Shell Guide to Dorset. He produced a considerable number of paintings and photographs during this period, some of which he used in the guide book. The guide was published in 1935 and featured some peculiarities of landscape and architecture that are often overlooked. Nash found Swanage with its diverse flora and fauna, fossils and geology to have certain Surrealist qualities. In a 1936 essay, entitled Swanage or Seaside Surrealism, he wrote that the place had something "of a dream image where things are so often incongruous and slightly frightening in their relation to time or place." Whilst there Nash met the artist Eileen Agar. The two began a relationship, which lasted some years, and also collaborated on a number of works together. In Swanage, Nash produced some notable surrealist works such as Events on the Downs, a picture of a giant tennis ball and a tree trunk seemingly embarking on a journey together and, later, Landscape from a Dream, a cliff-top scene with a hawk and mirror. For a collage of black and white photographs entitled Swanage, Nash depicts objects found in, or connected to, locations around Dorset within a surrealist landscape. On Romany Marsh Nash found his first surrealist object, or Objet trouvé. This piece of wood retrieved from a stream was likened by Nash to a fine Henry Moore sculpture and was shown at the first International Surrealist Exhibition in 1936 under the title Marsh Personage.

By the time of the exhibition Nash had come to dislike Swanage and in mid-1936 moved to a large house in Hampstead. Here he wrote articles on "seaside surrealism", created collages and assemblages, began his autobiography and organised a large one-man show at the Redfern Gallery in April 1937. That summer he visited the site of the Uffington White Horse in Berkshire and shortly afterwards began work on Landscape from a Dream. In 1939, shortly after World War II began, the Nashes left Hampstead and moved to Oxford.

== World War Two ==
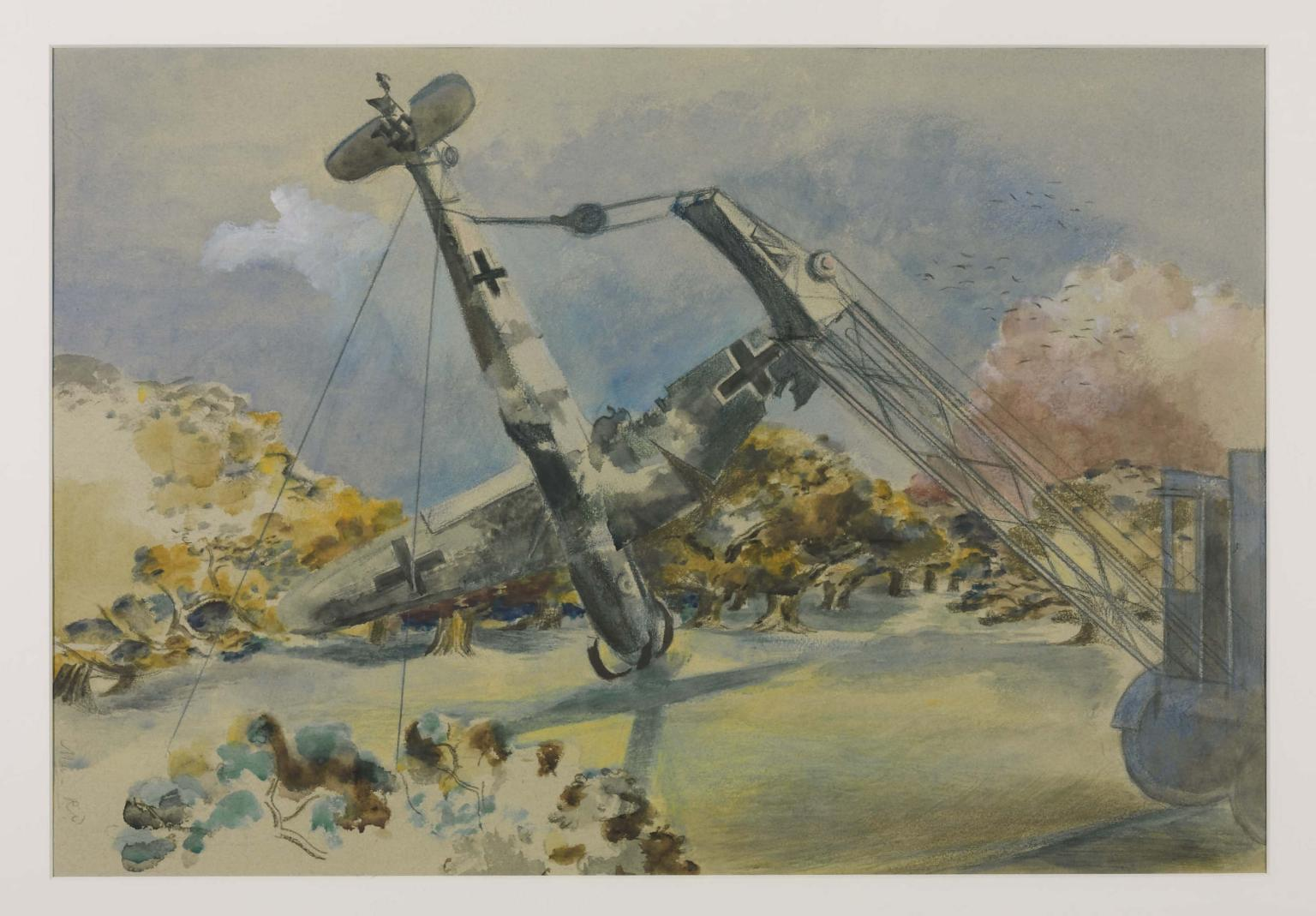
The Messerschmidt in Windsor Great Park (1940), Tate

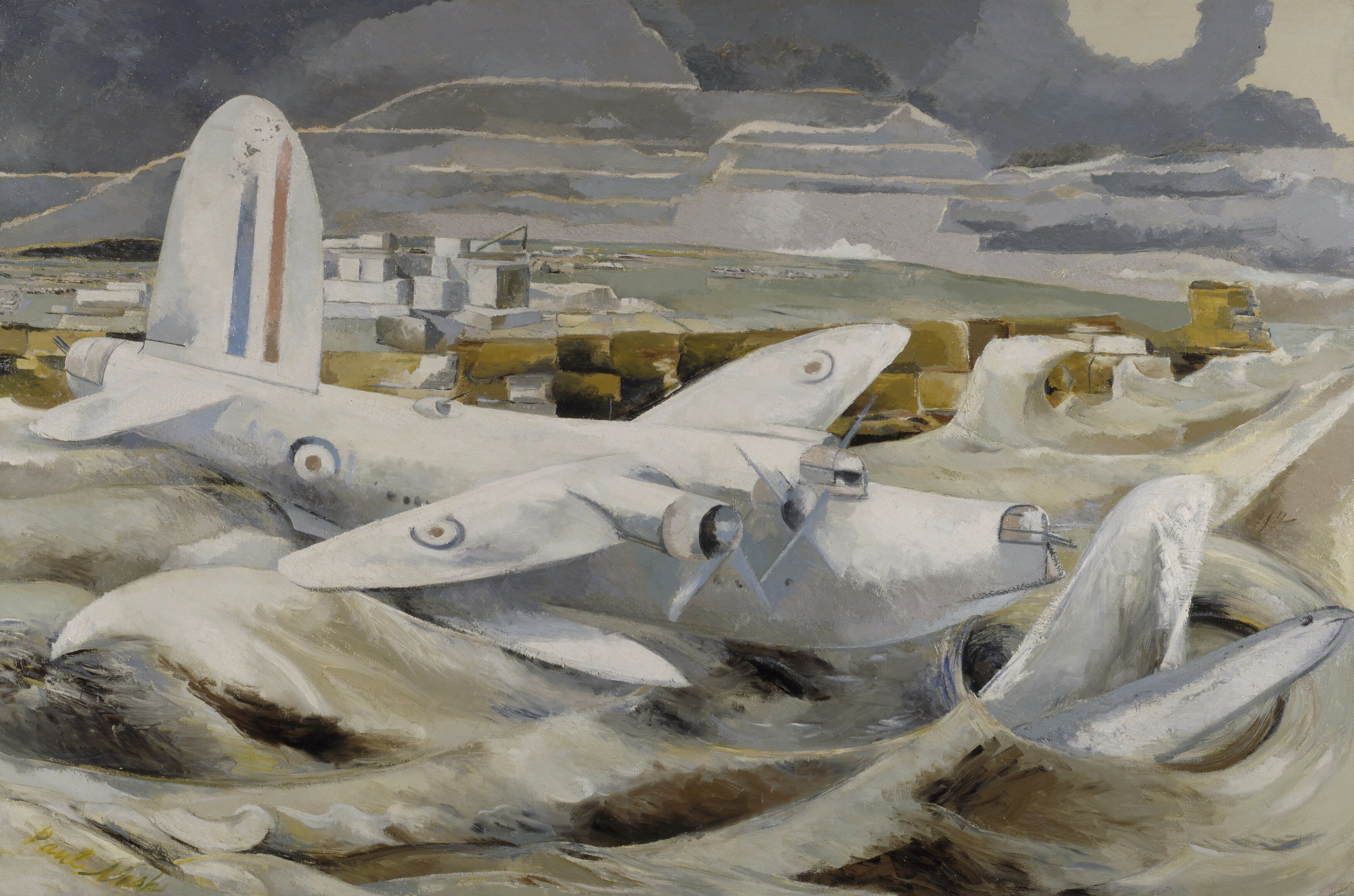
Defence of Albion (1942), collection of the Imperial War Museum, London

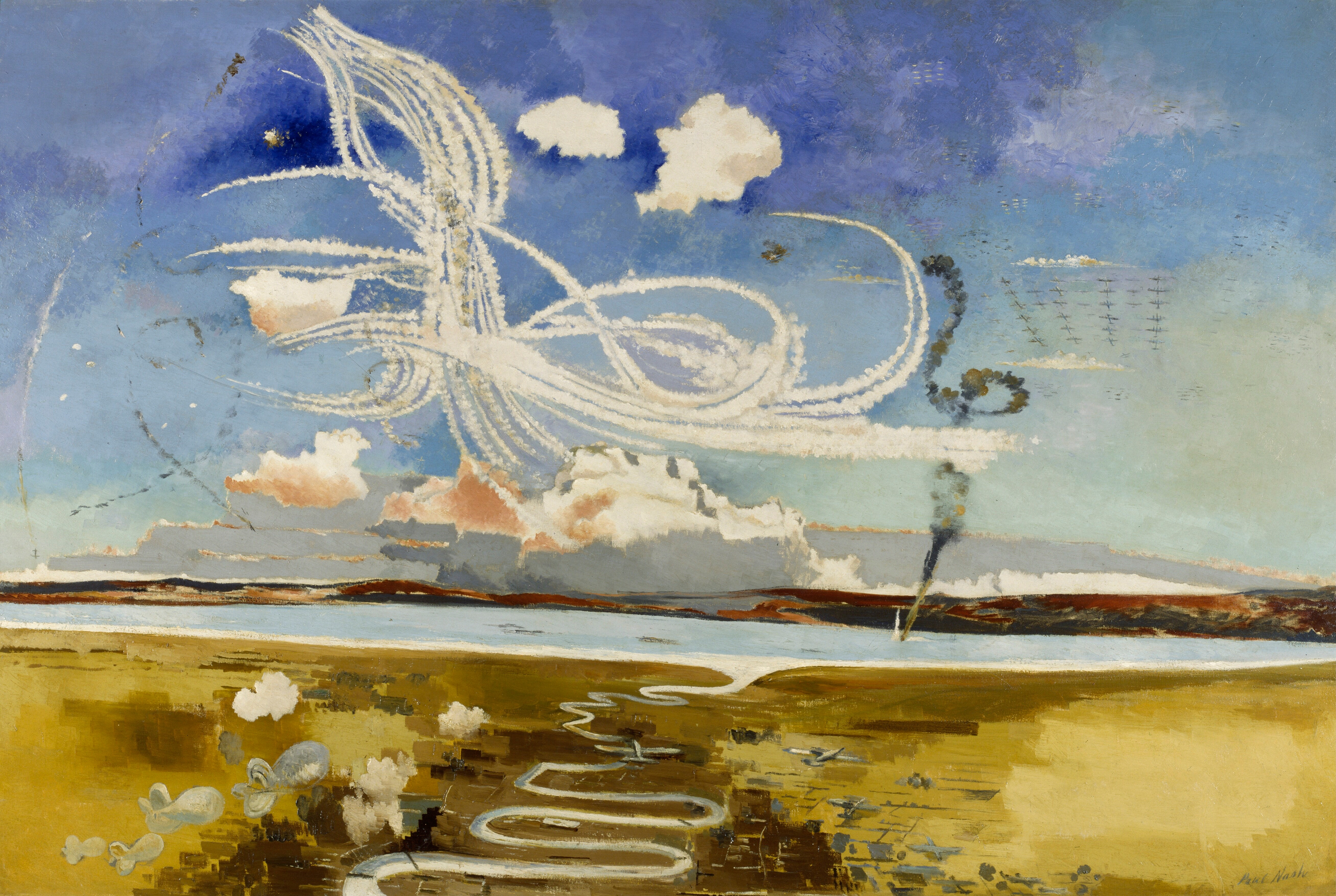
Battle of Britain (1941), collection of the Imperial War Museum, London

At the start of World War Two Nash was appointed by the War Artists' Advisory Committee to a full-time salaried war artist post attached to the Royal Air Force and the Air Ministry. Nash was unpopular with the Air Ministry representative on the WAAC committee, partly because of the modernist nature of his work and partly because the RAF wanted the WAAC artists to concentrate on producing portraits of their pilots and aircrew. Whilst still a salaried WAAC artist Nash produced two series of watercolours, Raiders and Aerial Creatures. Raiders, or Marching Against England, was a set of studies of crashed German aircraft set in English rural landscapes with titles such as Bomber in the Corn, The Messerschmidt in Windsor Great Park and Under the Cliff. Whilst the Air Ministry could appreciate the patriotic intent and propaganda value of those works, the Aerial Creatures series, with its anthropomorphic depictions of British aircraft, displeased the Air Ministry so much they insisted Nash's full-time contract was ended in December 1940. The Chairman of WAAC, Kenneth Clark was aghast at this development and in January 1941 the Committee agreed to put aside £500 to purchase works from Nash on the theme of aerial conflict. Nash worked intermittently under this arrangement until 1944 to produce four paintings for WAAC. The first two of these were Totes Meer (Dead Sea) and Battle of Britain.

Totes Meer (Dead Sea) was submitted to WAAC in 1941 and shows a 'dead sea' of wrecked German plane wings and fuselages based on sketches, and photographs, made at the Metal and Produce Recovery Unit at Cowley near Oxford in 1940. The painting recalls a series of bleak sea and coastal paintings Nash made in the 1930s. Although the aircraft dump at Cowley contained many British planes, Nash only depicted German aircraft because he wished to show the fate of the 'hundreds and hundreds of flying creatures which invaded these shores'. He used the German title for the picture as he wanted it included in a series of postcards of crashed German planes he suggested be dropped over the Reich as propaganda. To this end Nash even created a postcard of the painting with Hitler's head superimposed on the wrecked aircraft. Kenneth Clark stated that Totes Meer was 'the best war picture so far I think' and is still considered among the most celebrated British paintings of World War II.

Battle of Britain (1941) is an imaginative representation of an aerial battle in progress over a wide landscape of land and sea, suggesting the Thames Estuary and the English Channel. The white vapour trails of the Allied aircraft form patterns resembling buds and petals and appear to be growing naturally from the land and clouds, in contrast to the rigid, formal ranks of the attacking forces. Clark recognised the allegorical nature of the work and wrote to Nash, "I think in this and Totes Meer you have discovered a new form of allegorical painting. It is impossible to paint great events without allegory... and you have discovered a way of making the symbols out of the events themselves."

After completing Battle of Britain, Nash found himself creatively blocked and again sick with asthma. Whilst unable to paint he did produce a number of photographic collages which included symbols and motifs from previous works often alongside images of Hitler. Nash submitted a series of these pieces, entitled Follow the Fuehrer, to the Ministry of Information for use as propaganda but they declined to use them. When he did resume painting, Nash produced Defence of Albion, which is considered the weakest of his four large WAAC paintings. Nash had great difficulties completing the painting which shows a Short Sunderland flying boat in the sea off Portland Bill. As he had only seen photographs of Sunderlands, and was too ill to go to the coast to view one, Nash wrote to Eric Ravilious, who had painted flying boats in Scotland, asking him to describe the effect of sunlight on the plane.

Battle of Germany (1944), collection of the Imperial War Museum, London

Nash's final painting for WAAC was however an extraordinary, imagined scene of a bombing raid on a city. Despite being given access to official reports and accounts from aircrews who had flown on raids to Germany, for the Battle of Germany, Nash adopted an unconventional abstract approach. Nash explained that it showed a city under attack with a pillar of smoke from burning buildings in the background and the white spheres of descending parachutes in the foreground. The pillar of smoke and the moon were as threatening to the city as the bombers, concealed within the red clouds, responsible for the explosions on the right side of the painting. Whilst Kenneth Clark found the painting difficult to understand because of what he called the "different planes of reality in which it is painted", he did recognize that it might herald one course that post-war art could take.

== Final works ==
From 1942 onwards, Nash often visited the artist Hilda Harrisson at her home, Sandlands on Boars Hill near Oxford, to convalesce after bouts of illness. From the garden at Sandlands, Nash had a view of the Wittenham Clumps, which he had first visited as a child and had painted both before World War I and again, as a background, in 1934 and 1935. He now painted a series of imaginative works of the Clumps under different aspects of the Moon. Paintings such as Landscape of the Vernal Equinox (1943) and Landscape of the Moon's Last Phase (1944) show a mystical landscape rich in the symbolism of the changing seasons and of death and rebirth. Another place in South Oxfordshire that Nash visited and revisited and found inspirational in his study of the Moon was the hamlet of Ascott. There he began in 1932 and completed in 1942 his painting Pillar and Moon, which explored "the mystical association of two objects which inhabit different elements and have no apparent relation in life...the pale stone sphere on top of a ruined pillar faces its counterpart the moon, cold and pale and solid as stone".

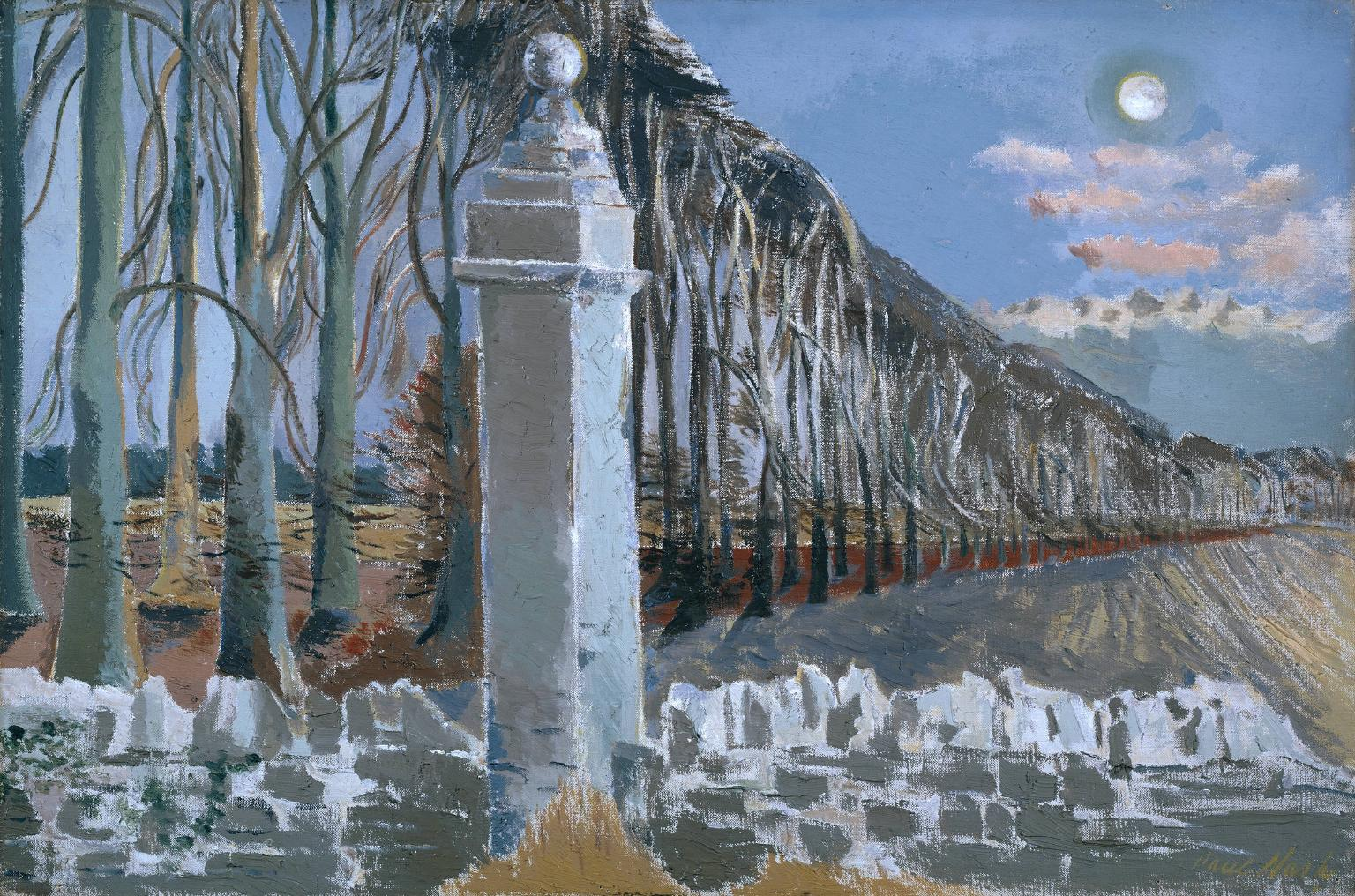
Pillar and Moon (1932–1942), collection of the Tate, London

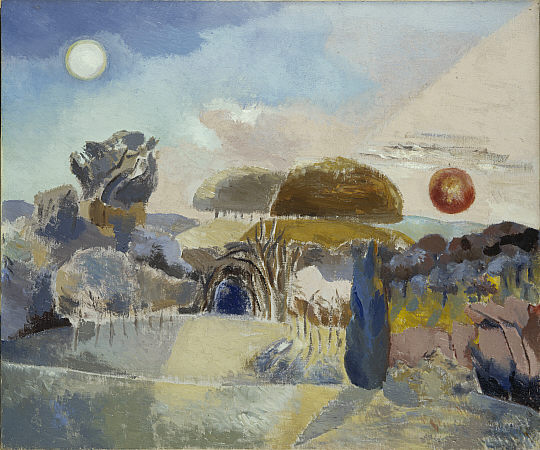
Landscape of the Vernal Equinox (1943), collection of the Scottish National Gallery, Edinburgh

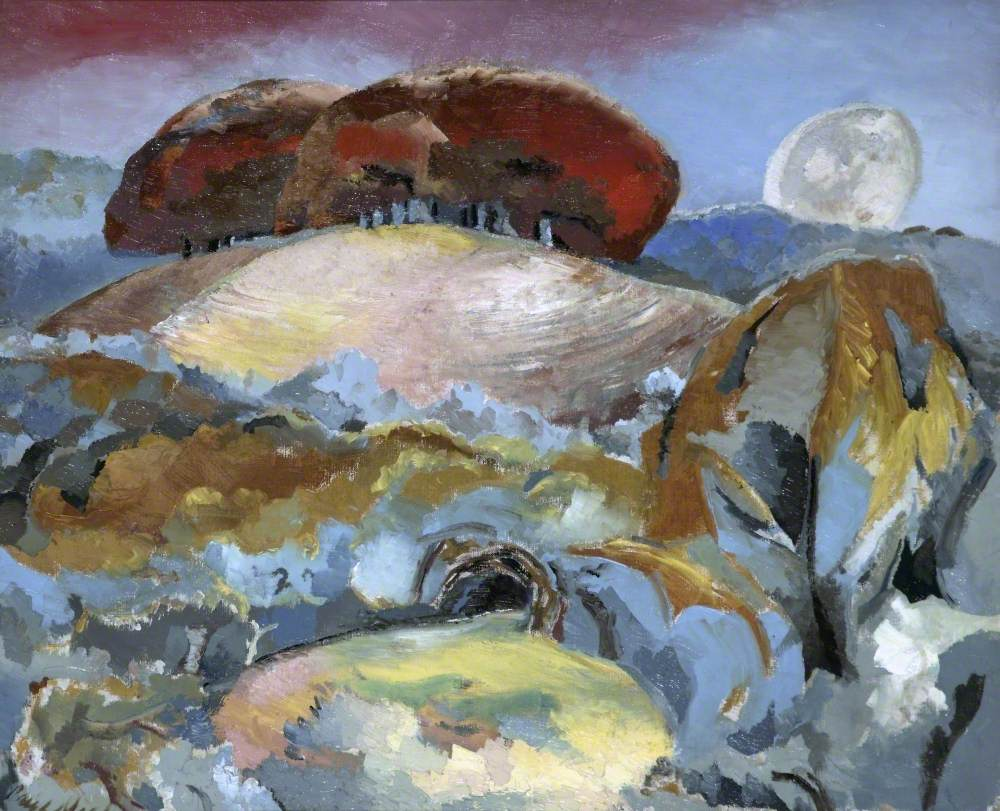
Landscape of the Moon's Last Phase (1944), collection of the Walker Art Gallery, Liverpool

The completion of Battle of Germany in September 1944 brought Nash's public commitments to an end and he spent the remaining eighteen months of his life in, by his own words, "reclusive melancholy". In these final months, Nash produced a series of paintings, including Flight of the Magnolia (1944), which he called 'Aerial Flowers' that combined his fascination with flying and his love of the works of Samuel Palmer. Nash also returned to the influence of William Blake that had so affected his early art, for example in the series of gigantic sunflowers including Sunflower and Sun (1942), Solstice of the Sunflower (1945) and Eclipse of the Sunflower (1945), based on Blake's 1794 poem "Ah! Sun-flower".

== Death ==
During the final ten days of his life Nash returned to Dorset and visited Swanage, Corfe, Worth Matravers and Kimmeridge Bay. Nash died in his sleep of heart failure, as a result of his long-term asthma, on 11 July 1946, at Boscombe in Hampshire (now Dorset) and was buried on 17 July, in the churchyard of St Mary the Virgin, Langley in Buckinghamshire (now Berkshire). The Egyptian stone carving of a hawk, that Nash had painted in Landscape from a Dream, was placed on his grave. A memorial exhibition and concert for Nash, attended by the then Queen Elizabeth, was held at the Tate Gallery in March 1948. His widow Margaret died in 1960 and the couple are buried together in Langley.

== Legacy and works on public display ==
Works by Nash are held in the collections of the Aberdeen Art Gallery, Art Gallery of New South Wales, Art Gallery of Western Australia, Beaverbrook Art Gallery, Bolton Art Gallery, Brighton & Hove Museums, Cleveland Museum of Art, Courtauld Institute of Art, Glynn Vivian Art Gallery, Harvard University Art Museums, Imperial War Museum, Manchester City Art Gallery, National Gallery of Victoria, National Museums Liverpool, Tate Gallery, The Huntington Library, The Priseman Seabrook Collection, Royal Air Force Museum London, Whitworth Art Gallery, The Norfolk Museums Collection and Wichita Art Museum. In 1980 a catalogue raisonné, by Andrew Causey, was published by Clarendon Press.

In 2016 English artist Dave McKean published Black Dog: The Dreams of Paul Nash, a graphic novel about Nash's life and work.

Paul Nash, a major exhibition of his work at Tate Britain in London, ran from October 2016 until 5 March 2017, then moving to the Sainsbury Centre for Visual Arts in Norwich from April to August 2017.

== Bibliography ==
- 1922: Places, Weidenfeld – text and wood-engravings
- 1924: Genesis, Nonesuch Press – a book of wood-engravings
- 1932: Room and Book, Soncino Press, London – essays on contemporary design
- 1935: Shell Guide to Dorset, Architectural Press – with Archibald Russell
- 1949: Outline – a partial autobiography, first published posthumously in 1949 and re-issued in 2016

== See also ==
- Category:Paintings by Paul Nash
