= The Seaside at Palavas =

1854 painting by Gustave Courbet

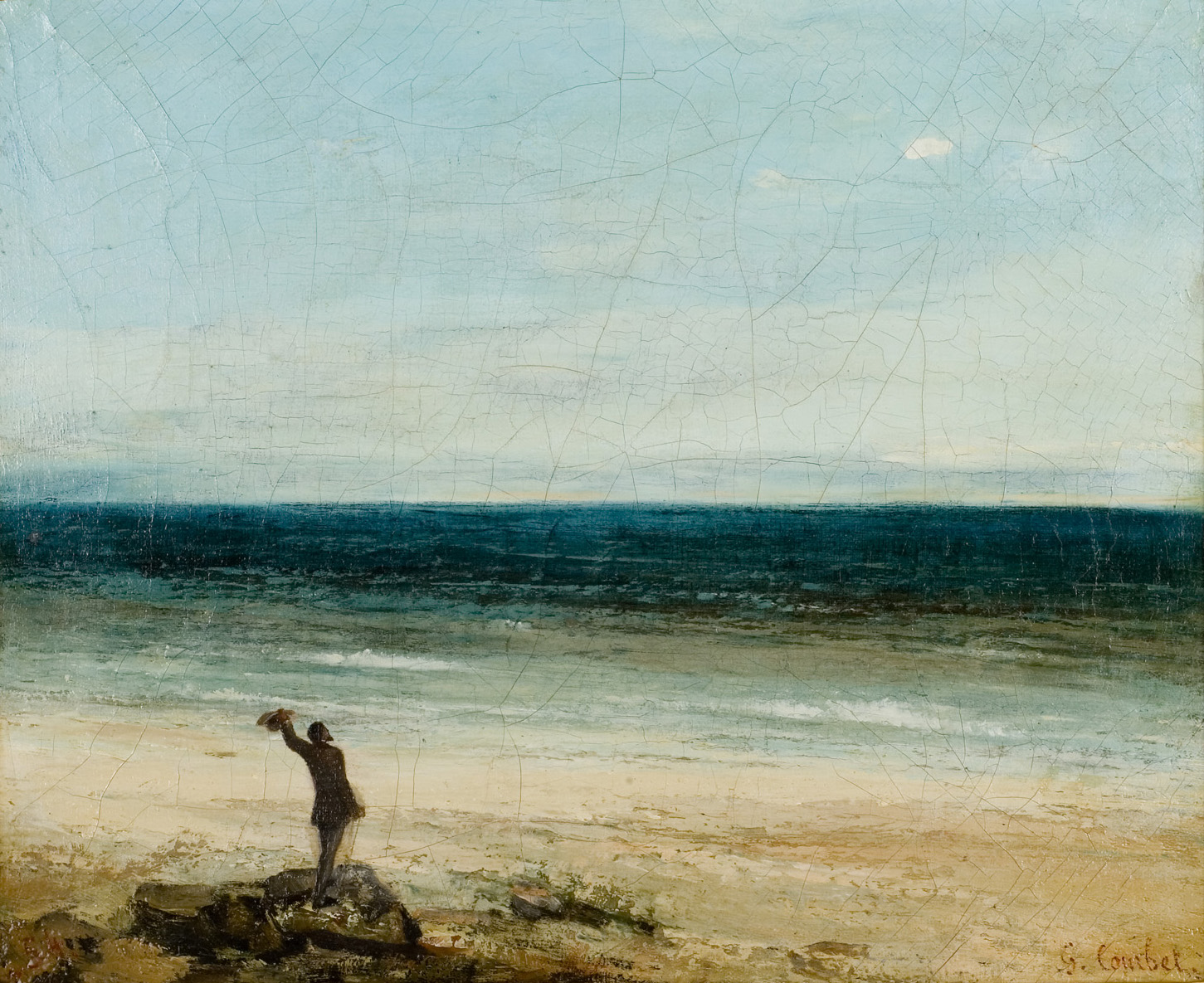
- Artist: Gustave Courbet
- Year: 1854
- Medium: oil on canvas
- Dimensions: 37 cm × 46 cm (15 in × 18 in)
- Location: Musée Fabre, Montpellier

The Seaside at Palavas is an oil on canvas painting by the French artist Gustave Courbet. It depicts a solitary figure standing on the coast facing the immensity of the sea.

It depicts the beach at Palavas-les-Flots. The painting was commissioned by Alfred Bruyas during Courbet's first stay at Montpellier. Courbet originated in Franche-Comté; the landscapes of Languedoc and the Mediterranean were a revelation. The work was also partly inspired by The Monk by the Sea by Caspar David Friedrich. It is now in the Musée Fabre in Montpellier.
