= The Abbey in the Oakwood =

Painting by Caspar David Friedrich

- Abtei im Eichwald (German)
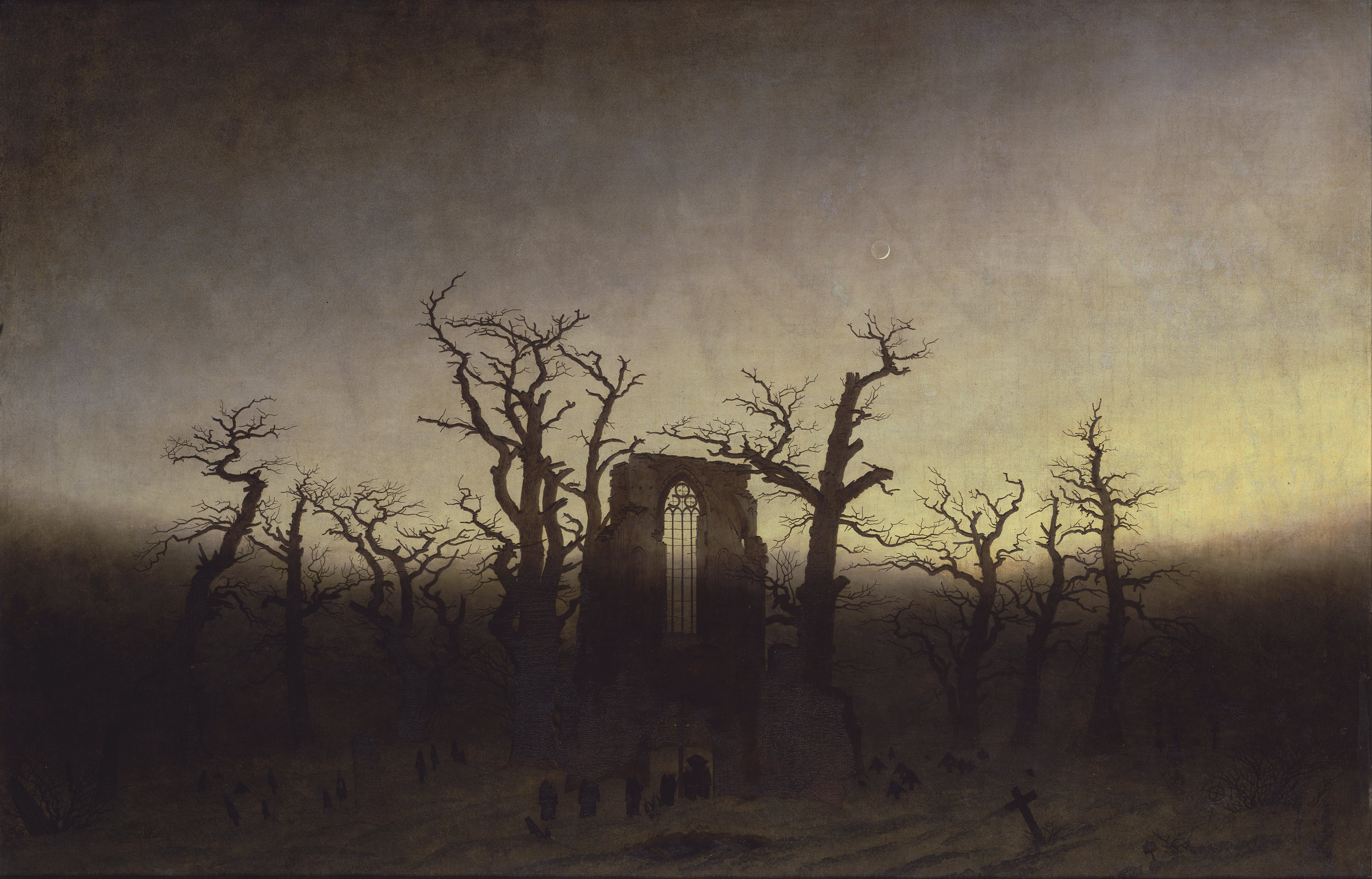
- Artist: Caspar David Friedrich
- Year: 1809–10
- Medium: Oil on canvas
- Dimensions: 110 cm × 171 cm (43.3 in × 67.3 in)
- Location: Alte Nationalgalerie, Berlin

The Abbey in the Oakwood (German: Abtei im Eichwald) is an oil painting by the German Romantic artist Caspar David Friedrich. It was painted between 1809 and 1810 in Dresden and was first shown together with the painting The Monk by the Sea in the Prussian Academy of Arts exhibition of 1810. On Friedrich's request The Abbey in the Oakwood was hung beneath The Monk by the Sea. This painting is one of over two dozen of Friedrich's works that include cemeteries or graves.

After the exhibition both pictures were bought by King Frederick William III for his collection. Today the paintings hang side by side in the Alte Nationalgalerie, Berlin.

== Description ==
This large painting is an example of a way Friedrich uses his painting skills to represent human life issues. In the painting, Friedrich painted an old abbey in the center. There are figures entering the abbey with a coffin. The artist is trying to convey a sense of passage of time by painting a human dying. There is a sense of coldness around the area. The remains of the abbey show a broken window with no remaining glass. What is seen is that nature is there forever, while man's creation is temporary. A procession of monks, some of whom bear a coffin, head toward the gate of a ruined Gothic church in the center of the painting. Only two candles light their way. A newly dug grave yawns out of the snow in the foreground, near which several crosses can be faintly discerned. This lower third of the picture lies in darkness—only the highest part of the ruins and the tips of the leafless oaks are lit by the setting sun. The waxing crescent moon appears in the sky.

== Development ==
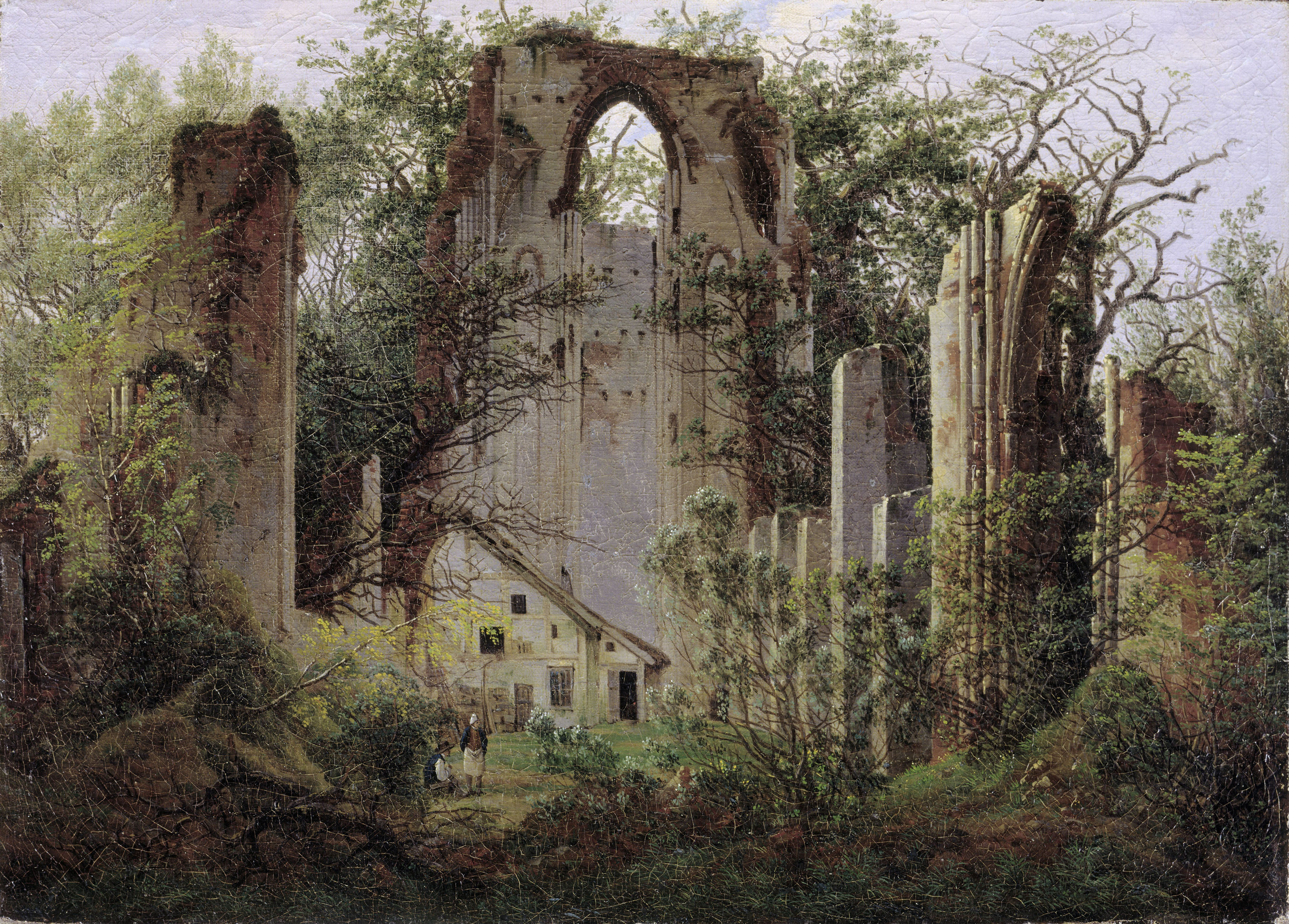
Ruins of Eldena near Greifswald (1825), oil on canvas; 35 × 49 cm, Alte Nationalgalerie

The picture appeared at a time when Friedrich had his first public success and critical acknowledgment with the controversial Tetschener Altar. Although Friedrich's paintings are landscapes, he designed and painted them in his studio, using freely drawn plein air sketches, from which he chose the most evocative elements to integrate into an expressive composition. The Abbey in the Oakwood is based upon studies of the ruins of Eldena Abbey, which reappear in several other paintings. The same trees, in slightly altered forms, can also be seen in other works.

Eldena Abbey may well have had personal meaning for Friedrich, as it was destroyed during the Thirty Years War by invading Swedish troops, who later used bricks from the abbey to construct fortifications. In the painting Friedrich draws a parallel between those actions and the use of Greifswald churches as barracks by occupying French soldiers. Thus, the funeral becomes a symbol of "the burial of Germany's hopes for resurrection".

Friedrich may have begun work on The Abbey in the Oakwood in June 1809 after a stay in Rügen, Neubrandenburg. On 24 September 1810, shortly before the Berlin Academy exhibition, Carl Frederick Frommann described the setting sun and half-moon of the nearly-finished painting.

== See also ==
- List of works by Caspar David Friedrich

== Notes ==
External videos
- Friedrich's Abbey among Oak Trees, Smarthistory
- Friedrich's Monk by the Sea, Smarthistory
