= The Monk by the Sea =

1808–1810 painting by Caspar David Friedrich

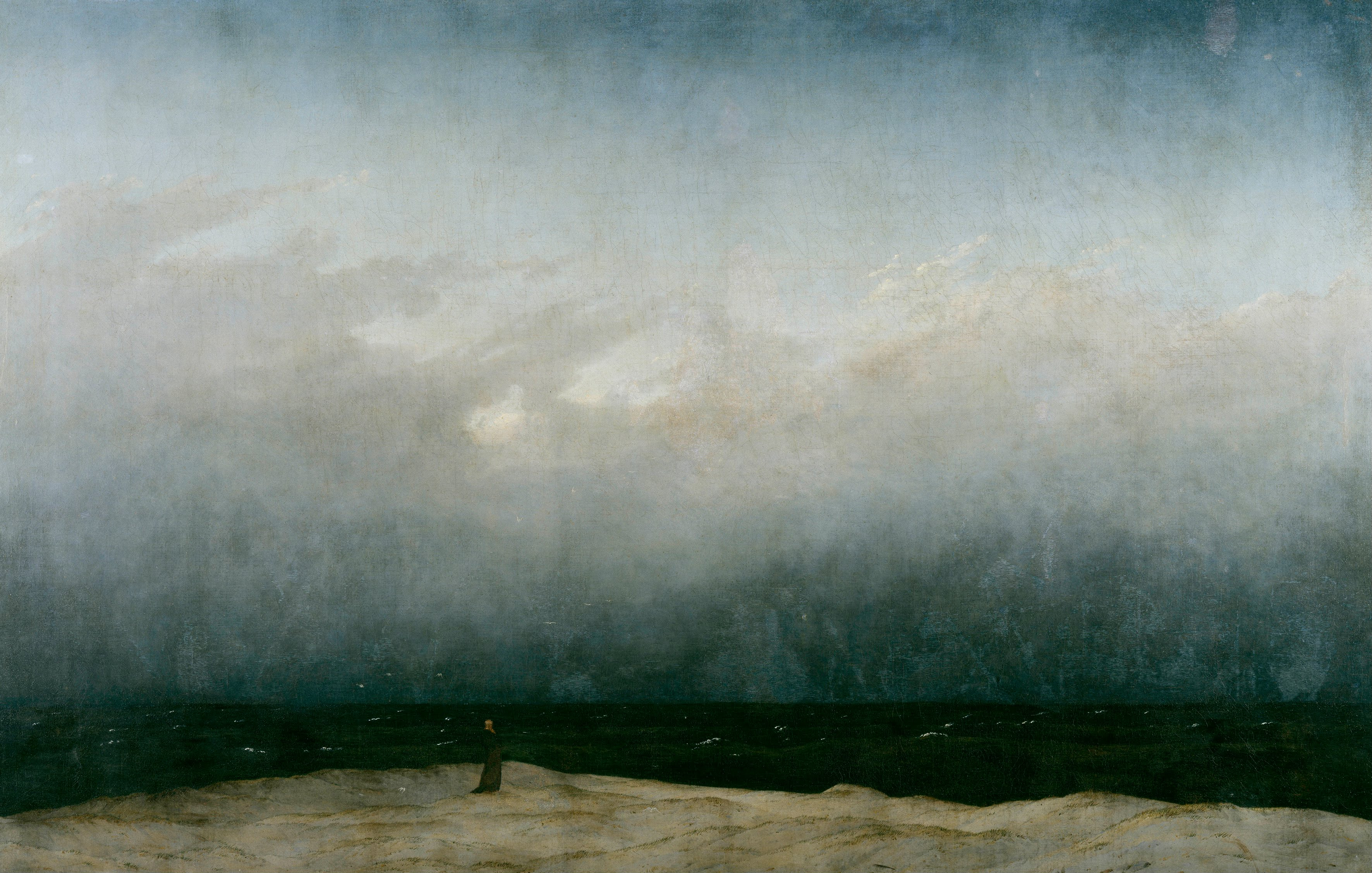
- Artist: Caspar David Friedrich
- Year: 1808–10
- Medium: Oil-on-canvas
- Dimensions: 110 cm × 171.5 cm (43 in × 67.5 in)
- Location: Alte Nationalgalerie, Berlin

The Monk by the Sea (German: Der Mönch am Meer) is an oil painting by the German Romantic artist Caspar David Friedrich. It was painted between 1808 and 1810 in Dresden and was first shown together with the painting The Abbey in the Oakwood (Abtei im Eichwald) in the Berlin Academy exhibition of 1810. On Friedrich's request The Monk by the Sea was hung above The Abbey in the Oakwood. After the exhibition, both pictures were bought by King Frederick William III for his collection. Today, the paintings hang side by side in the Alte Nationalgalerie, Berlin.

For its lack of concern with creating the illusion of depth, The Monk by the Sea was Friedrich's most radical composition. The broad expanses of sea and sky emphasize the meager figure of the monk, standing before the vastness of nature and the presence of God.

== Development ==
A single figure, dressed in a long garment, stands on a low dune sprinkled with grass. The figure, usually identified as a monk, has turned almost completely away from the viewer and surveys a rough sea and a gray, blank sky that takes up about three quarters of the picture. It is unclear whether he is standing on a high rock or only on a gentle slope to the sea. The dune forms an inexpressive triangle in the composition, at the farthest point of which is the figure. Contrasting with the dark ocean there are several whitecaps of waves sometimes mistaken for seagulls.

Although Friedrich's paintings are landscapes, he designed and painted them in his studio, using freely drawn plein air sketches, from which he chose the most evocative elements to integrate into an expressive composition. The composition of The Monk by the Sea shows evidence of this reductive process, as Friedrich removed elements from the canvas after they were painted. Recent scientific investigations have revealed that he had initially painted two small sailing ships on the horizon, which he later removed. Friedrich continued to modify the details of the painting right up to its exhibition—to the sky's grey was added blue, with stars and a moon—but the basic composition always stayed the same.

The picture appeared at a time when Friedrich had his first public success and critical acknowledgment with his controversial Tetschener Altar, a work that explicitly fused the landscape format with a religious theme. The Monk by the Sea furthered his success and drew much attention.

Friedrich probably began the painting in Dresden, 1808. In a letter of February 1809, he described the image for the first time. The stages in its conception were also documented by guests to his studio. In June 1809, the wife of painter Gerhard von Kügelgen, an acquaintance of Friedrich, visited him and later criticized the painting in a letter; she was put off by the loneliness of the setting and the lack of consolation that movement or narrative might provide the "unending space of air".

Art historian Albert Boime believed that the figure of the monk was Friedrich, walking on the cliffs at Rügen, which would place the subject near the site where a Protestant mystic built a chapel for poor fishermen who were far from home and wished to profess their faith. The identification of the monk as a self-portrait has been accepted by other scholars, both for physical resemblances to Friedrich (the long blond hair and round skull), and for the fact that, in keeping with the perception of artists as belonging to a "higher priesthood", Friedrich later painted himself in a monk's clothing.

== Contemporary reception ==
External videos
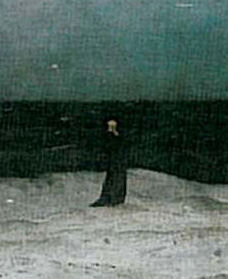
- Friedrich's Monk by the Sea, Smarthistory

The painting was exhibited in its current form at the Berlin Academy in October 1810, to much controversy and criticism. The composition notably lacks a repoussoir—a framing device that leads the viewer's gaze into the image. Rather, the emptiness of the foreground is overwhelming. It is commonly argued^{[By who]} that a viewer of this painting has difficulty relating himself to the picture's space. One cannot mentally "penetrate" the image: Friedrich has created an unbridgeable gap between the monk and the viewer. The monk is cut off from us spatially and existentially, and there are no traditional landscape elements that might soften the effect—only a cold sky and a flat foreground, void of greenery, and a dark sea, reduced to a narrow band on which no vessels sail. Friedrich has compressed space in a manner anticipating abstract art; The Monk by the Sea has been described as "perhaps the first 'abstract' painting in a very modern sense."

In the month of the exhibition, German Romantic author Clemens Brentano submitted an article on the painting to the Berliner Abendblätter, a new daily journal edited by his friend Heinrich von Kleist. The piece, titled "Different Feelings about a Seascape by Friedrich on which is a Capuchin Monk", was critical of the work, but Kleist substantially revised Brentano's text to produce an article sympathetic to Friedrich's painting. Kleist's commentary has become a central element in discussion of the painting and of Friedrich; the two men are seen as at odds with the aesthetic of the more conventional German Romantics, in which Brentano was firmly entrenched.

Kleist wrote, for example:

How wonderful it is to sit completely alone by the sea under an overcast sky, gazing out over the endless expanse of water. It is essential that one has come there just for this reason, and that one has to return. That one would like to go over the sea but cannot; that one misses any sign of life, and yet one senses the voice of life in the rush of the water, in the blowing of the wind, in the drifting of the clouds, in the lonely cry of the birds ... No situation in the world could be more sad and eerie than this—as the only spark of life in the wide realm of death, a lonely center in a lonely circle... Nevertheless, this definitively marks a totally new departure in Friedrich's art...

More famously, Kleist also wrote, "since in its monotony and boundlessness it has no foreground except the frame, when viewing it, it is as if one's eyelids had been cut away."

The painting was too minimalist for Johann Wolfgang von Goethe, who had been a supporter of Friedrich by introducing his work to the duke of Weimar and gaining prizes for him at an 1805 exhibition. Goethe said the painting "could be looked at standing on one's head," making a criticism that would be levied against abstract artists a century later.

== Influence ==
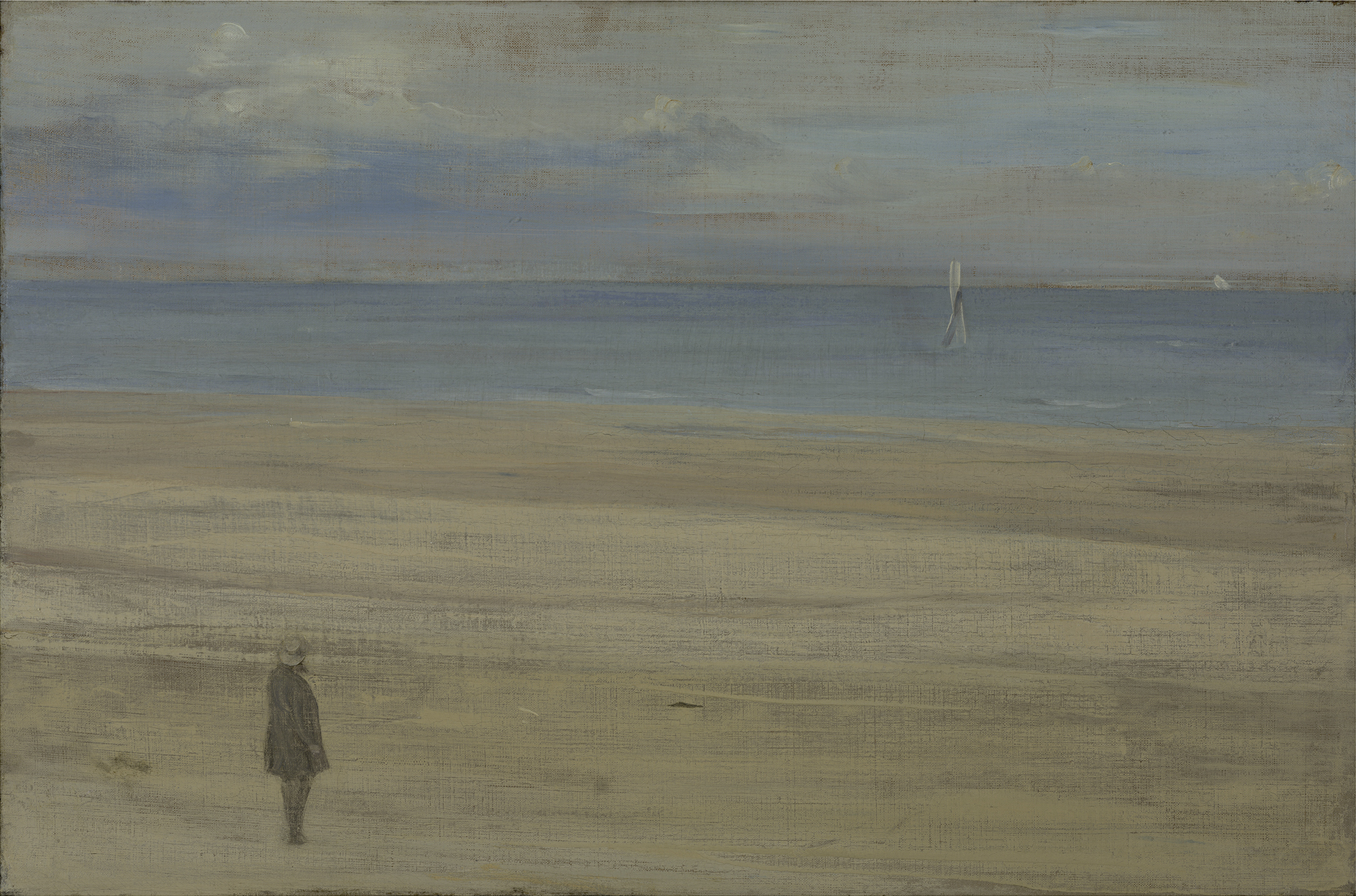
James Abbott McNeill Whistler, Harmony in blue and silver: Trouville, 1865

The Monk by the Sea inspired responses from painters like Gustave Courbet and James Abbott McNeill Whistler later in the 19th century. In works such as Gustave Courbet's The Coast Near Palavas a lone figure is depicted as a seeker, similarly exposed and looking out to sea.

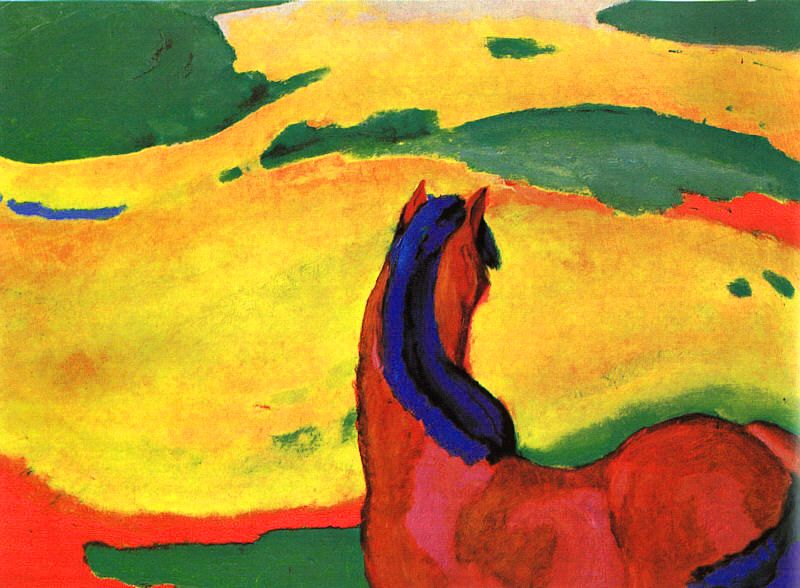
Expressionist painter Franz Marc's Horse in a Landscape bears formal similarities with The Monk by the Sea.

Friedrich, though a Romantic painter, had a significant influence on later Symbolist and Expressionist artists. Franz Marc's Horse in a Landscape (1910) has been described as formally similar to The Monk by the Sea. Although their use of colour is at two extremes, both paintings are compositionally simple, with undulating horizontals and a figure that looks out at the same scene as the viewer. In his 1961 article "The Abstract Sublime", the art historian Robert Rosenblum drew comparisons between the Romantic landscape paintings of both Friedrich and J. M. W. Turner with the Abstract Expressionist paintings of Mark Rothko. Rosenblum specifically describes The Monk by the Sea, Turner's The Evening Star and Rothko's 1954 Light, Earth and Blue as revealing affinities of vision and feeling. According to Rosenblum, "Rothko, like Friedrich and Turner, places us on the threshold of those shapeless infinities discussed by the aestheticians of the Sublime. The tiny monk in the Friedrich and the fisher in the Turner establish a poignant contrast between the infinite vastness of a pantheistic God and the infinite smallness of His creatures. In the abstract language of Rothko, such literal detail—a bridge of empathy between the real spectator and the presentation of a transcendental landscape—is no longer necessary; we ourselves are the monk before the sea, standing silently and contemplatively before these huge and soundless pictures as if we were looking at a sunset or a moonlit night." From the 1960s on, Gotthard Graubner's picture-size coloured cushions or "color-space bodies" were also inspired by Friedrich's The Monk by the Sea. According to art historian Werner Hofmann, both Graubner and Friedrich created an aesthetics of monotony as a counterpart to the aesthetics of variety that was predominant before the nineteenth century.

It has been noted that the setting and framing of several shots in the "meat grinder" scene from Andrei Tarkovsky's Stalker bear a strong resemblance to The Monk By The Sea.
