= Caspar David Friedrich =

German Romantic landscape painter (1774–1840)

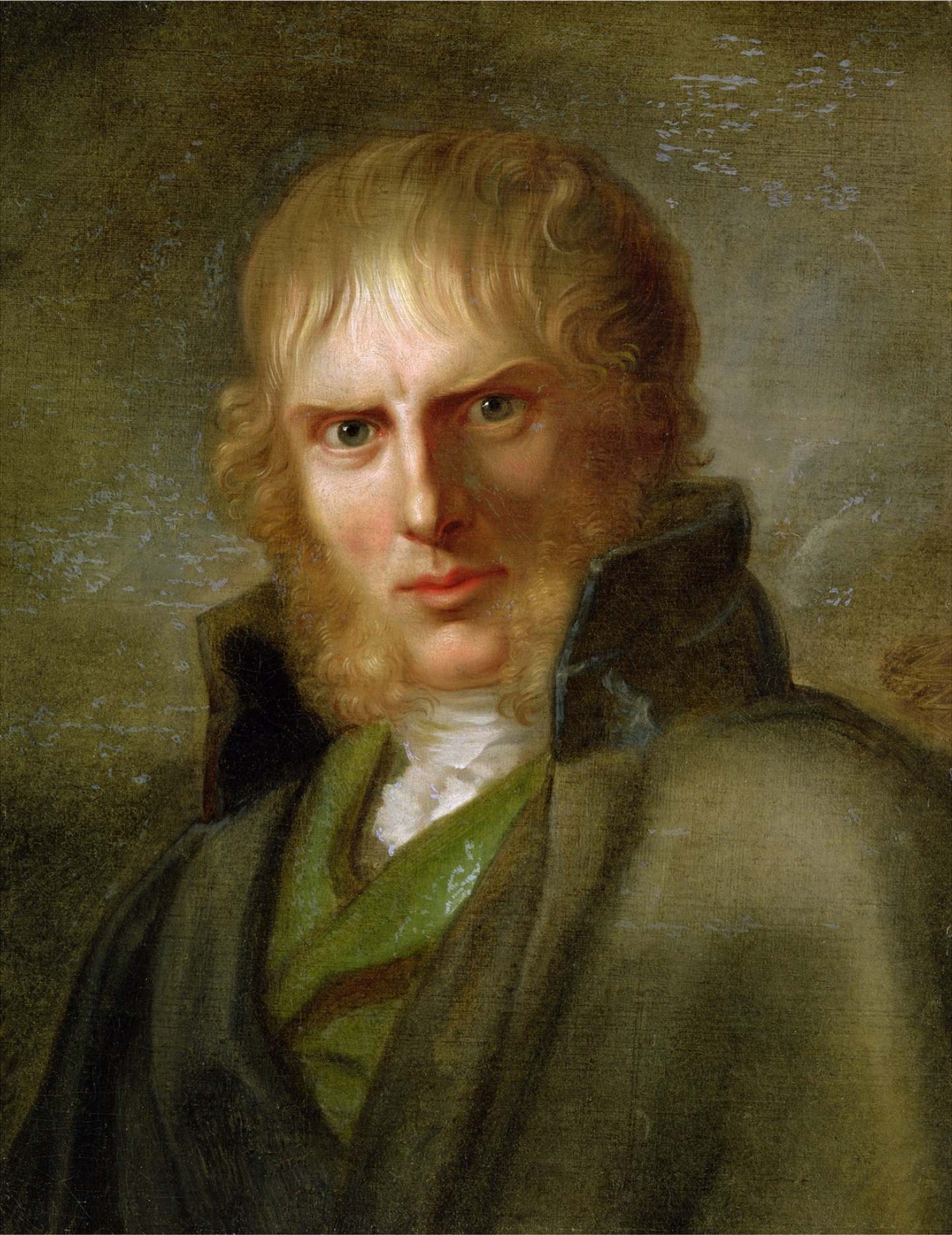
- Portrait by Gerhard von Kügelgen, c. 1810–1820
- Born: 5 September 1774; Greifswald, Swedish Pomerania, Holy Roman Empire
- Died: 7 May 1840 (aged 65); Dresden, Kingdom of Saxony, German Confederation
- Known for: Landscape painting
- Notable work: List of works
- Movement: German Romanticism

Caspar David Friedrich (German: [ˌkaspaʁ ˌdaːvɪt ˈfʁiːdʁɪç]; 5 September 1774 – 7 May 1840) was a German Romantic landscape painter, generally considered the most important German artist of his generation, whose often symbolic, and anti-classical work, conveys a subjective, emotional response to the natural world. Friedrich's paintings often set contemplative human figures silhouetted against night skies, morning mists, barren trees or Gothic ruins. Art historian Christopher John Murray described their presence, in diminished perspective, amid expansive landscapes, as reducing the figures to a scale that directs "the viewer's gaze towards their metaphysical dimension".

Friedrich was born in the town of Greifswald on the Baltic Sea in what was at the time Swedish Pomerania. He studied in Copenhagen from 1794 to 1798, before settling in Dresden. He came of age during a period when, across Europe, a growing disillusionment with materialistic society was giving rise to a new appreciation of spirituality. This shift was often expressed through a reevaluation of the natural world, as artists such as Friedrich, J. M. W. Turner and John Constable sought to depict nature as a "divine creation, to be set against the artifice of human civilization".

Friedrich's work brought him renown early in his career. Contemporaries such as the French sculptor David d'Angers spoke of him as having discovered "the tragedy of landscape". His work nevertheless fell from favour during his later years, and he died in obscurity. As Germany moved towards modernisation in the late 19th century, a new sense of urgency characterised its art, and Friedrich's contemplative depictions of stillness came to be seen as products of a bygone age.

The early 20th century brought a renewed appreciation of his art, beginning in 1906 with an exhibition of thirty-two of his paintings in Berlin. His work influenced Expressionist artists and later Surrealists and Existentialists. The rise of Nazism in the early 1930s saw a resurgence in Friedrich's popularity, but this was followed by a sharp decline as his paintings were, by association with the Nazi movement, considered to be promoting German nationalism. Since the 1970s, Friedrich has experienced a major international revival and is regarded as one of the most important artists of German Romanticism and a national cultural icon.

== Life ==
=== Early years and family ===
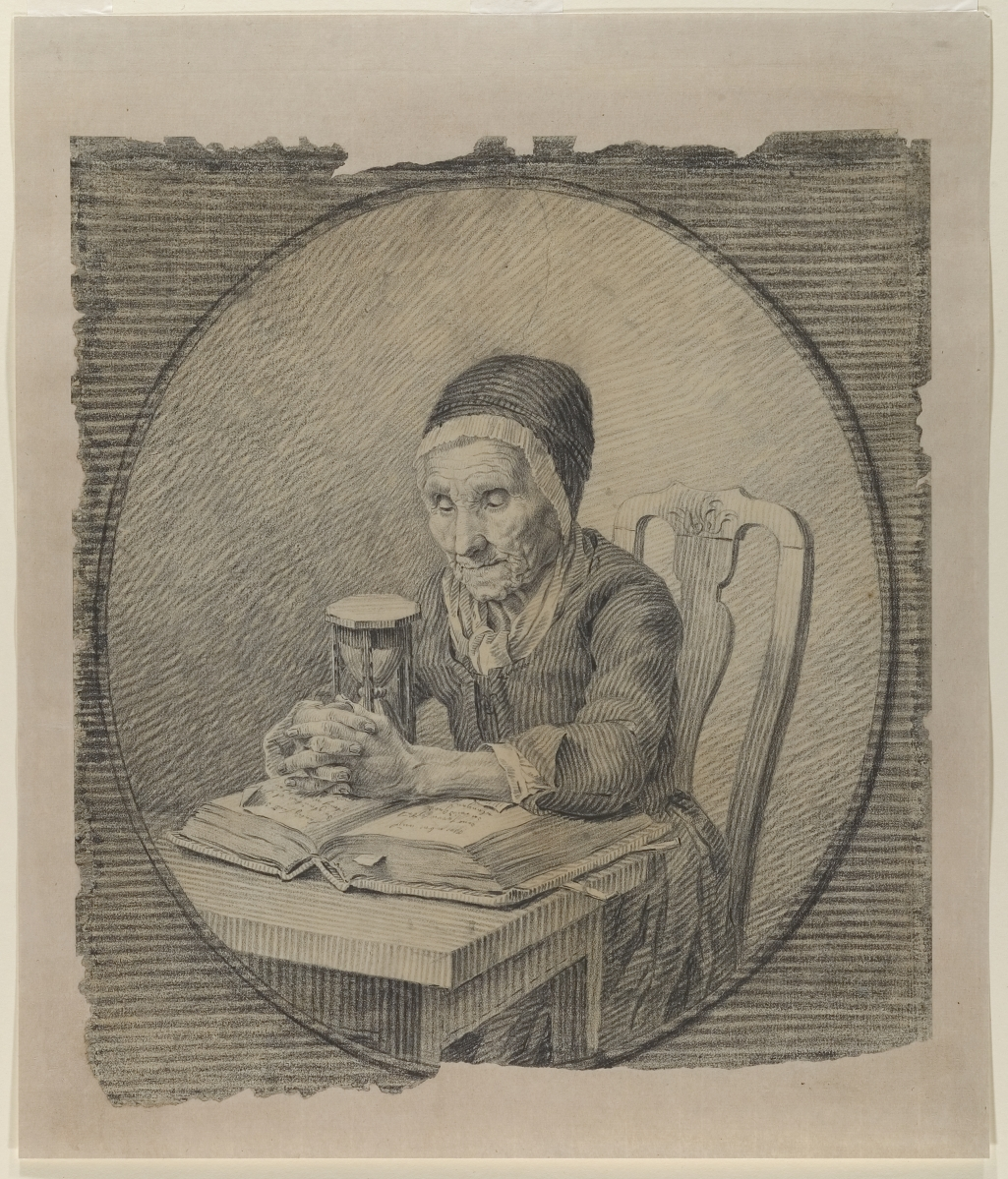
Old woman with hourglass and Bible (Portrait of Mother Heiden), c. 1801–1802

Caspar David Friedrich was born on 5 September 1774, in Greifswald, Swedish Pomerania, on the Baltic coast of Germany. (Note: Pomerania had been divided between Sweden and Brandenburg-Prussia since 1648, and at the time of Caspar David's birth, it was still part of the Holy Roman Empire. Napoleon occupied the territory from 1807 to 1810, and in 1815 all of Pomerania passed to Prussian sovereignty.) The sixth of ten children, he was raised in the strict Lutheran creed of his father Adolf Gottlieb Friedrich, a candle-maker and soap boiler. Records of the family's financial circumstances are contradictory; while some sources indicate the children were privately tutored, others record that they were raised in relative poverty. He became familiar with death from an early age. His mother, Sophie, died in 1781 when he was seven. (Note: The family was raised by their housekeeper and nurse, "Mutter Heide", who had a warm relationship with all of the Friedrich children.) A year later, his sister Elisabeth died, and a second sister, Maria, succumbed to typhus in 1791. Arguably the greatest tragedy of his childhood happened in 1787 when his brother Johann Christoffer died: at the age of thirteen, Caspar David witnessed his younger brother fall through the ice of a frozen lake and drown. Some accounts suggest that Johann Christoffer perished while trying to rescue Caspar David, who was also in danger on the ice.

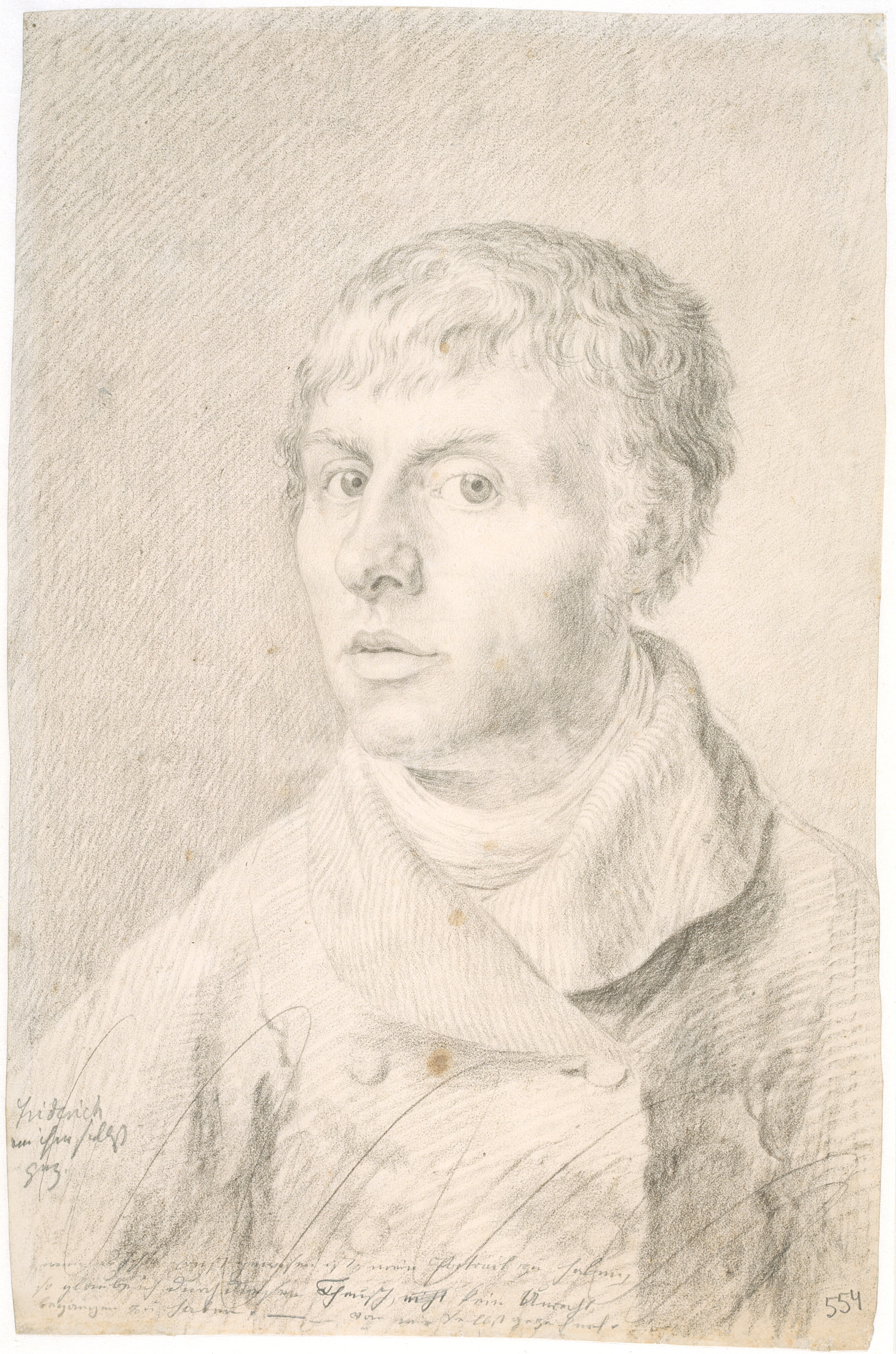
Self-portrait (1800), chalk

Friedrich began his formal study of art in 1790 as a private student of artist Johann Gottfried Quistorp at the University of Greifswald in his home city, at which the art department is now named Caspar-David-Friedrich-Institut in his honour. Quistorp took his students on outdoor drawing excursions; as a result, Friedrich was encouraged to sketch from life at an early age. Through Quistorp, Friedrich met and was subsequently influenced by the theologian Ludwig Gotthard Kosegarten, who taught that nature was a revelation of God. Quistorp introduced Friedrich to the work of the German 17th-century artist Adam Elsheimer, whose works often included religious subjects dominated by landscape, and nocturnal subjects. During this period he also studied literature and aesthetics with Swedish professor Thomas Thorild. Friedrich entered the prestigious Academy of Copenhagen four years later, where he began by making copies of casts from antique sculptures before proceeding to drawing from life.

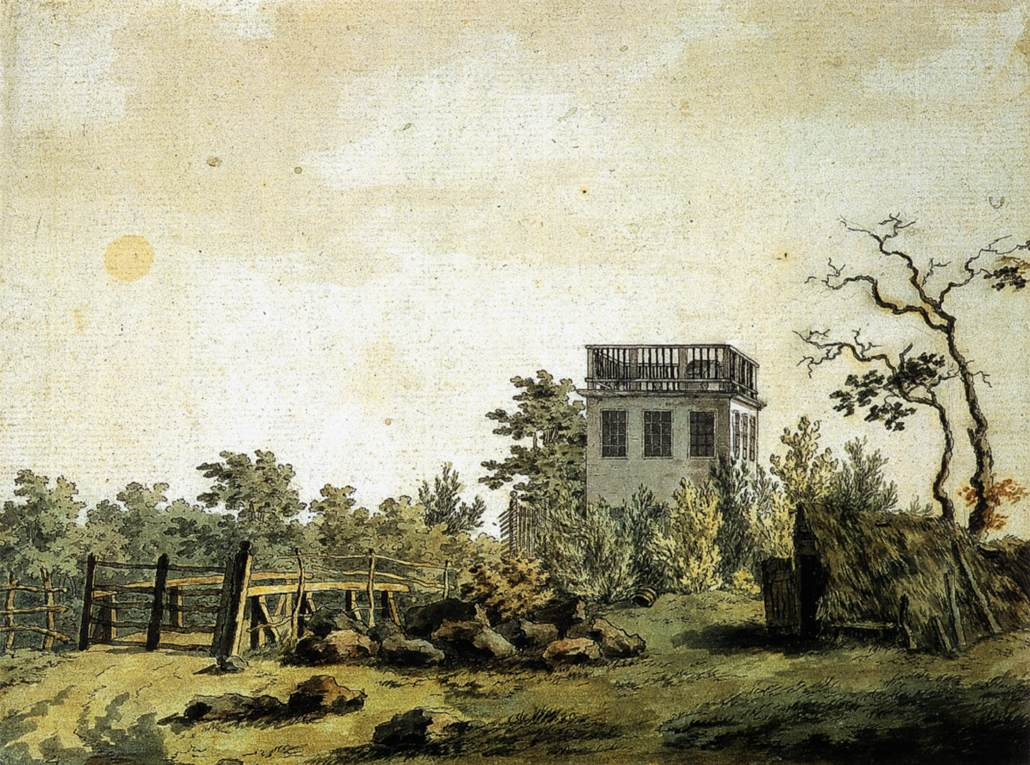
Landscape with Pavilion (1797). This early work shows typical themes: ragged landscape, closed gate, building of uncertain purpose.

Living in Copenhagen afforded the young painter access to the Royal Picture Gallery's collection of 17th-century Dutch landscape painting. At the academy, he studied under teachers such as Christian August Lorentzen and the landscape painter Jens Juel. These artists were inspired by the Sturm und Drang movement and represented a midpoint between the dramatic intensity and expressive manner of the budding Romantic aesthetic and the waning neo-classical ideal. Mood was paramount, and influence was drawn from such sources as the Icelandic legend of Edda, the poems of Ossian and Norse mythology.

=== Move to Dresden ===
Friedrich settled permanently in Dresden in 1798. During this early period, he experimented in printmaking with etchings and designs for woodcuts which his furniture-maker brother cut. By 1804 he had produced 18 etchings and four woodcuts; they were apparently made in small numbers and only distributed to friends. Despite these forays into other media, he gravitated toward working primarily with ink, watercolour and sepias. With the exception of a few early pieces, such as Landscape with Temple in Ruins (1797), he did not work extensively with oils until his reputation was more established.

Landscapes were his preferred subject, inspired by frequent trips, beginning in 1801, to the Baltic coast, Bohemia, the Krkonoše and the Harz Mountains. Mostly based on the landscapes of northern Germany, his paintings depict woods, hills, harbours, morning mists and other light effects based on a close observation of nature. These works were modelled on sketches and studies of scenic spots, such as the cliffs on Rügen, the surroundings of Dresden and the river Elbe. He executed his studies almost exclusively in pencil, even providing topographical information, yet the subtle atmospheric effects characteristic of Friedrich's mid-period paintings were rendered from memory. These effects took their strength from the depiction of light, and of the illumination of sun and moon on clouds and water: optical phenomena peculiar to the Baltic coast that had never before been painted with such an emphasis.

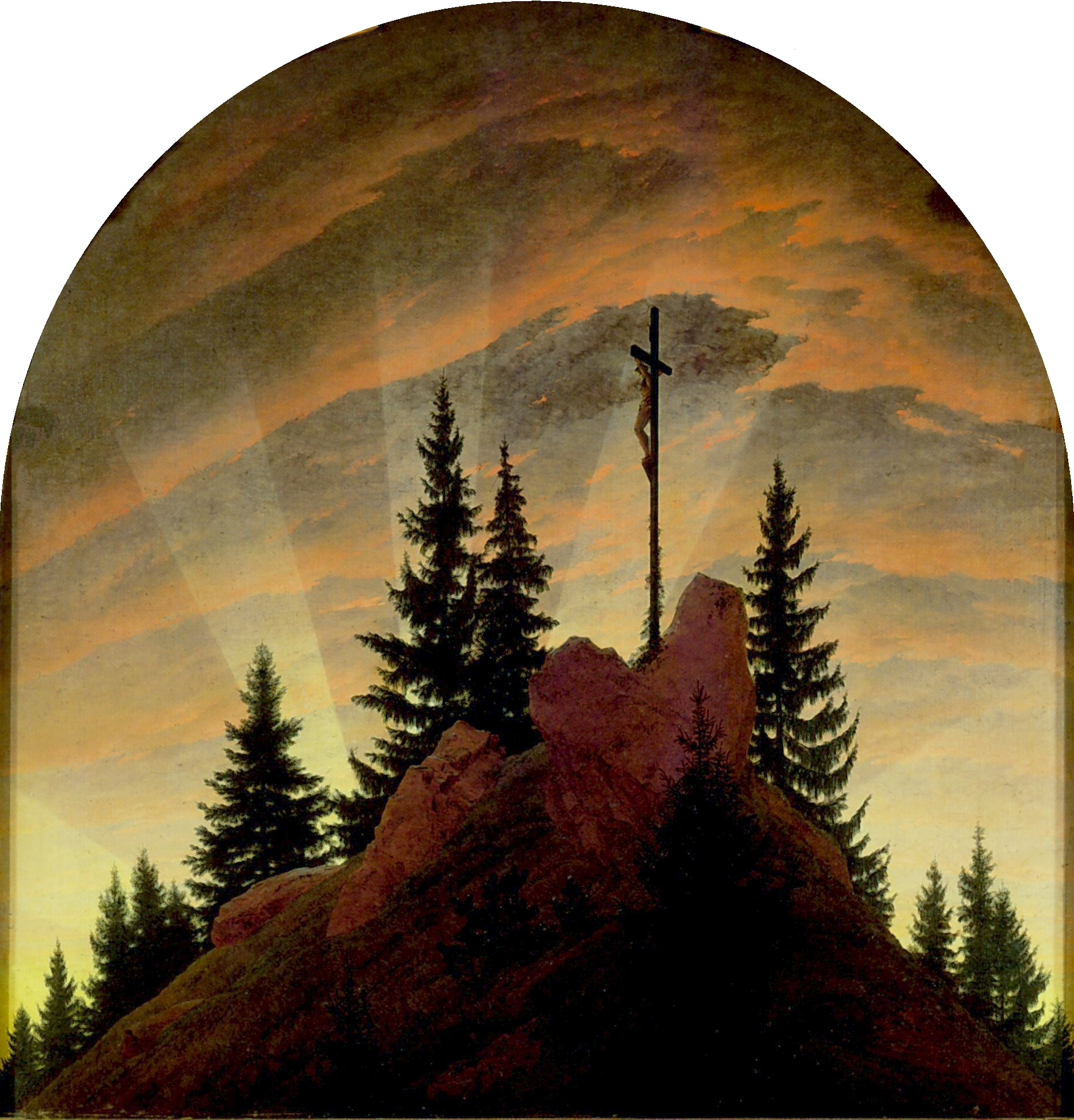
Cross in the Mountains (Tetschen Altar) (1808). 115 × 110.5 cm. Galerie Neue Meister, Dresden; Friedrich's first major work.

His reputation as an artist was established when he won a prize in 1805 at the Weimar competition organised by Johann Wolfgang von Goethe. At the time, the Weimar competition tended to draw mediocre and now-forgotten artists presenting derivative mixtures of neo-classical and pseudo-Greek styles. The poor quality of the entries began to prove damaging to Goethe's reputation, so when Friedrich entered two sepia drawings—Procession at Dawn and Fisher-Folk by the Sea—the poet responded enthusiastically and wrote, "We must praise the artist's resourcefulness in this picture fairly. The drawing is well done, the procession is ingenious and appropriate ... his treatment combines a great deal of firmness, diligence and neatness ... the ingenious watercolour ... is also worthy of praise."

Friedrich completed the first of his major paintings in 1808, at the age of 34. Cross in the Mountains, today known as the Tetschen Altar, is an altarpiece panel said to have been commissioned for a family chapel in Tetschen, Bohemia. The panel depicts a cross in profile at the top of a mountain, alone, and surrounded by pine trees.

Although the altarpiece was generally coldly received, it was Friedrich's first painting to receive wide publicity. The artist's friends publicly defended the work, while art critic Basilius von Ramdohr published a long article challenging Friedrich's use of landscape in a religious context. He rejected the idea that landscape painting could convey explicit meaning, writing that it would be "a veritable presumption, if landscape painting were to sneak into the church and creep onto the altar". Friedrich responded with a programme describing his intentions in 1809, comparing the rays of the evening sun to the light of the Holy Father. This statement marked the only time Friedrich recorded a detailed interpretation of his own work, and the painting was among the few commissions the artist ever received.

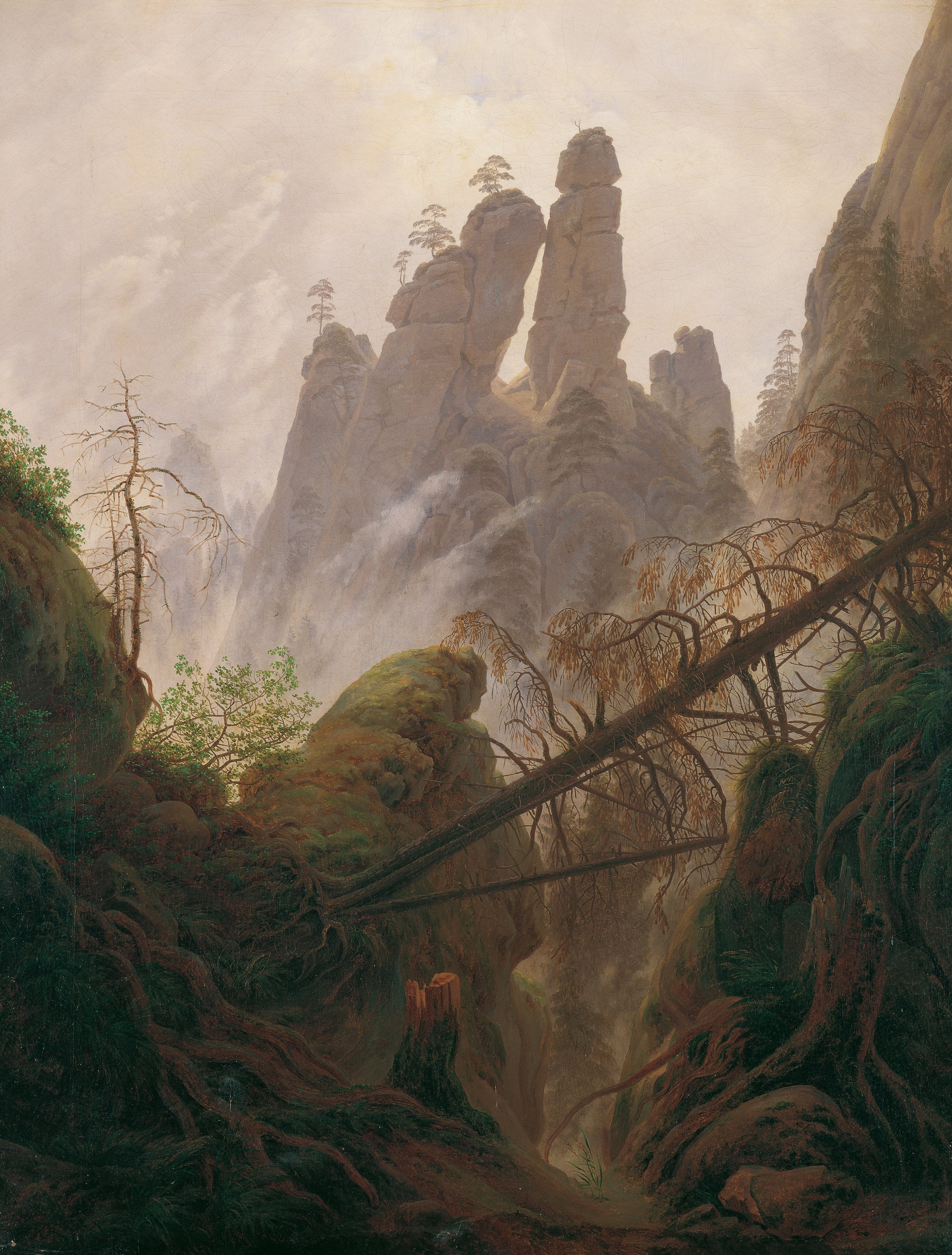
Rocky Landscape in the Elbe Sandstone Mountains (1822–1823)

Following the purchase of two of his paintings by the Prussian Crown Prince, Friedrich was elected a member of the Berlin Academy in 1810. Yet in 1816, he sought to distance himself from Prussian authority and applied that June for Saxon citizenship. The move was not expected; the Saxon government was pro-French, while Friedrich's paintings were seen as generally patriotic and distinctly anti-French. Nevertheless, with the aid of his Dresden-based friend Graf Vitzthum von Eckstädt, Friedrich attained citizenship, and in 1818, membership in the Saxon Academy with a yearly dividend of 150 thalers. Although he had hoped to receive a full professorship, it was never awarded him as, according to the German Library of Information, "it was felt that his painting was too personal, his point of view too individual to serve as a fruitful example to students." Politics may have played a role in stalling his career: Friedrich's decidedly Germanic subjects and costuming frequently clashed with the era's prevailing pro-French attitudes.

=== Marriage ===
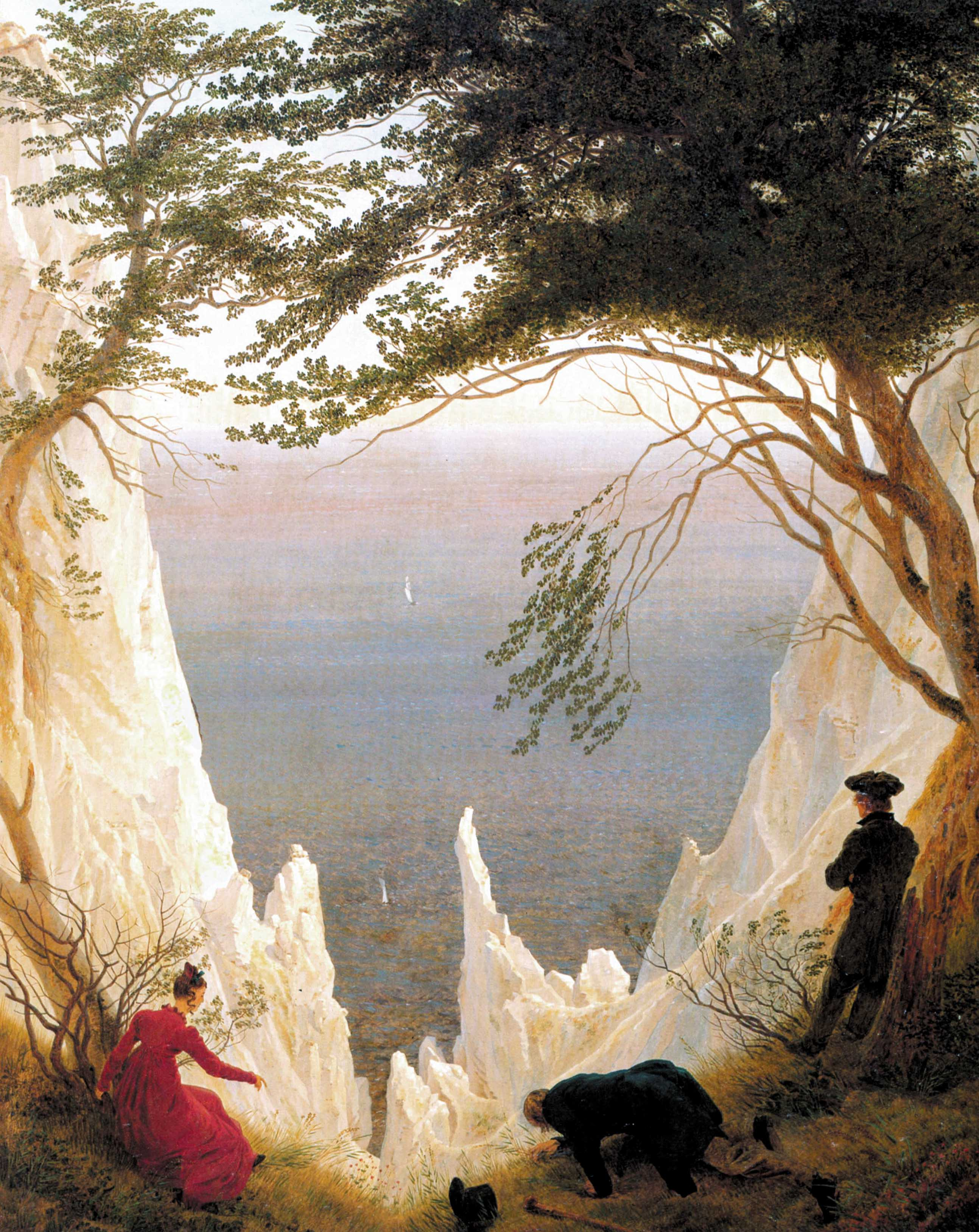
Chalk Cliffs on Rügen (1818). Friedrich married Christiane Caroline Bommer in 1818, and on their honeymoon they visited relatives in Neubrandenburg and Greifswald. This painting celebrates the couple's union.

On 21 January 1818, Friedrich married Caroline Bommer, the twenty-five-year-old daughter of a dyer from Dresden. The couple had three children, with their first, Emma, arriving in 1820. Gustav Adolf, their third child, was named after Swedish King Gustavus Adolphus, and became a notable painter in his own right.

The physiologist and painter Carl Gustav Carus notes in his biographical essays that marriage did not impact significantly on either Friedrich's life or personality, yet his canvasses from this period, including Chalk Cliffs on Rügen—painted after his honeymoon—display a new sense of levity, while his palette is brighter and less austere. Human figures appear with increasing frequency in the paintings of this period, which Siegel interprets as a reflection that "the importance of human life, particularly his family, now occupies his thoughts more and more, and his friends, his wife, and his townspeople appear as frequent subjects in his art."

Around this time, he found support from two sources in Russia. In 1820, the Grand Duke Nikolai Pavlovich, at the behest of his wife Alexandra Feodorovna, visited Friedrich's studio and returned to Saint Petersburg with a number of his paintings, an exchange that began a patronage that continued for many years. Not long thereafter, the poet Vasily Zhukovsky, tutor to the Grand Duke's son (later Tsar Alexander II), met Friedrich in 1821 and found in him a kindred spirit. Zhukovsky helped Friedrich for decades, both by purchasing his work himself and by recommending his art to the royal family; his assistance toward the end of Friedrich's career proved invaluable to the ailing and impoverished artist. Zhukovsky remarked that his friend's paintings "please us by their precision, each of them awakening a memory in our mind."

Friedrich was acquainted with Philipp Otto Runge, another leading German painter of the Romantic period. He was also a friend of Georg Friedrich Kersting, and painted him at work in his unadorned studio, and of the Norwegian painter Johan Christian Clausen Dahl (1788–1857). Dahl was close to Friedrich during the artist's final years and he expressed dismay that to the art-buying public, Friedrich's pictures were only "curiosities". While the poet Zhukovsky appreciated Friedrich's psychological themes, Dahl praised the descriptive quality of Friedrich's landscapes, commenting that "artists and connoisseurs saw in Friedrich's art only a kind of mystic, because they themselves were only looking out for the mystic ... They did not see Friedrich's faithful and conscientious study of nature in everything he represented".

== Later life ==
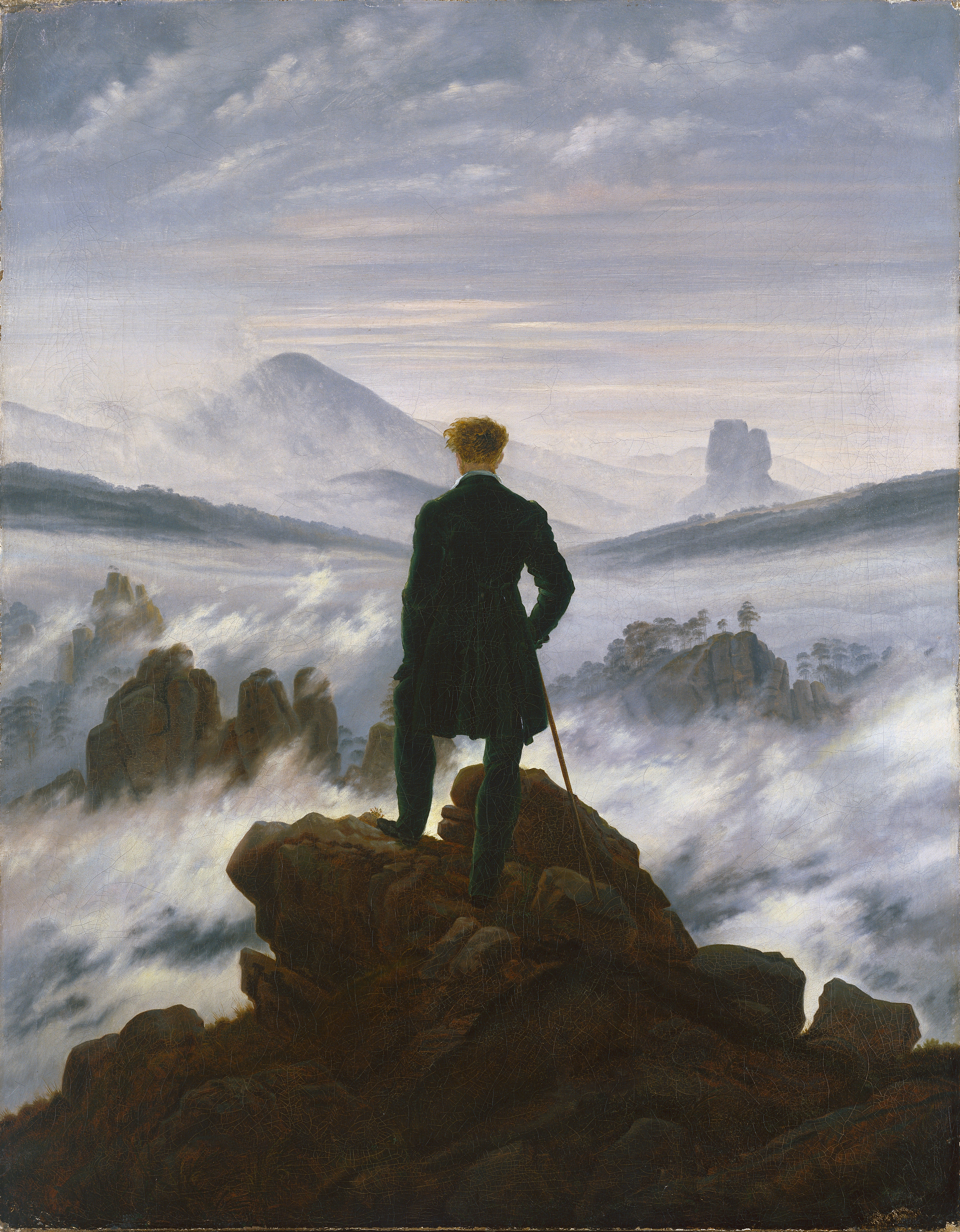
Wanderer above the Sea of Fog (1818), Kunsthalle Hamburg

Friedrich's reputation steadily declined over the final fifteen years of his life. As the ideals of early Romanticism passed from fashion, he came to be viewed as an eccentric and melancholy character, out of touch with the times. Gradually his patrons fell away. By 1820, he was living as a recluse and was described by friends as the "most solitary of the solitary". Towards the end of his life he lived in relative poverty. He became isolated and spent long periods of the day and night walking alone through woods and fields, often beginning his strolls before sunrise.

He suffered his first stroke in June 1835, which left him with minor limb paralysis and greatly reduced his ability to paint. As a result, he was unable to work in oil and limited to watercolour, sepia and reworking older compositions. Although his vision remained strong, he had lost the full strength of his hand. Yet he was able to produce a final 'black painting', Seashore by Moonlight (1835–1836), described by Vaughan as the "darkest of all his shorelines, in which richness of tonality compensates for the lack of his former finesse". Symbols of death appeared in his work from this period. Soon after his stroke, the Russian royal family purchased a number of his earlier works, and the proceeds allowed him to travel to Teplitz—in today's Czech Republic—to recover.

During the mid-1830s, Friedrich began a series of portraits and returned to observing himself in nature. As the art historian William Vaughan observed, however, "He can see himself as a man greatly changed. He is no longer the upright, supportive figure that appeared in Two Men Contemplating the Moon in 1819. He is old and stiff ... he moves with a stoop". By 1838, he was capable of working in a small format only. He and his family were living in poverty and grew increasingly dependent for support on the charity of friends.

=== Death ===
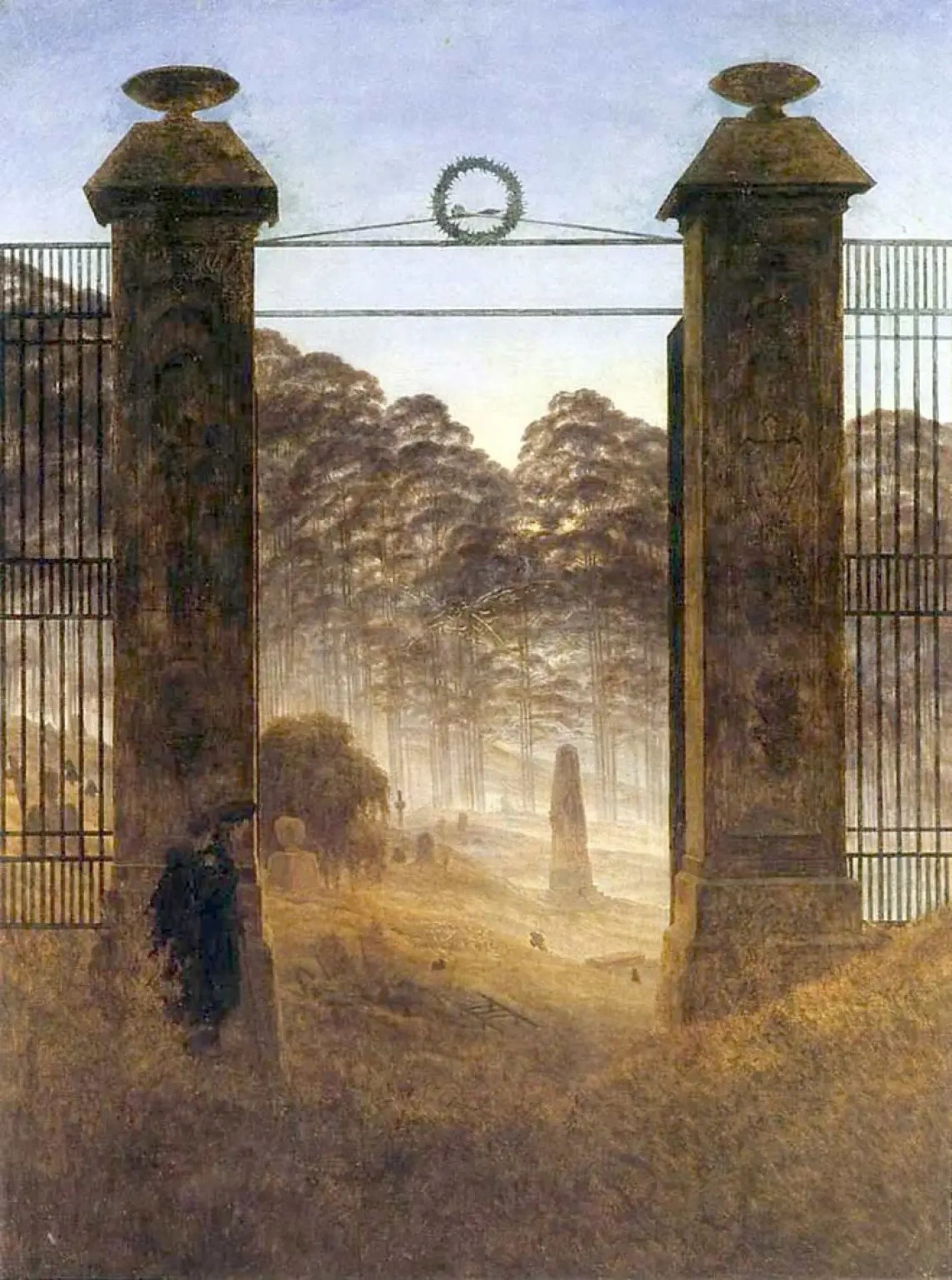
Cemetery Entrance, Galerie Neue Meister, Dresden

Friedrich died in Dresden on 7 May 1840 and was buried in Dresden's Trinitatis-Friedhof (Trinity Cemetery) east of the city centre (the entrance to which he had painted with his Cemetery Entrance in 1825). His wife Caroline died in poverty in 1847.

By this time his reputation and fame had waned, and his death was little noticed within the artistic community. His artwork had certainly been acknowledged during his lifetime, but not widely. While the close study of landscape and an emphasis on the spiritual elements of nature were commonplace in contemporary art, his interpretations were highly original and personal.

Carl Gustav Carus later wrote a series of articles which paid tribute to Friedrich's transformation of the conventions of landscape painting. However, Carus' articles placed Friedrich firmly in his time and did not place the artist within a continuing tradition. Only one of his paintings had been reproduced as a print, and that was produced in very few copies. (Note: The French sculptor David d'Angers, who visited Friedrich in 1834, was moved by the devotional issues explored in the artist's canvases. He exclaimed to Carus in 1834, "Friedrich...The only landscape painter so far to succeed in stirring up all the forces of my soul, the painter who has created a new genre: the tragedy of the landscape.")

== Themes ==
=== Landscape and the sublime ===
What the newer landscape artists see in a circle of a hundred degrees in Nature they press together unmercifully into an angle of vision of only forty-five degrees. And furthermore, what is in Nature separated by large spaces, is compressed into a cramped space and overfills and oversatiates the eye, creating an unfavorable and disquieting effect on the viewer.

— Caspar David Friedrich

The visualisation and portrayal of landscape in an entirely new manner was Friedrich's key innovation. He sought not just to explore the enjoyment of a beautiful view as in the classic conception, but rather to examine an instant of sublimity through the contemplation of nature. Friedrich was instrumental in transforming landscape in art from a backdrop subordinated to human drama to a self-contained emotive subject. His paintings often employed the Rückenfigur—a person seen from behind, contemplating the view. The vantage point encourages the viewer to identify with the Rückenfigur, and share with the artist the sublime appreciation of nature.

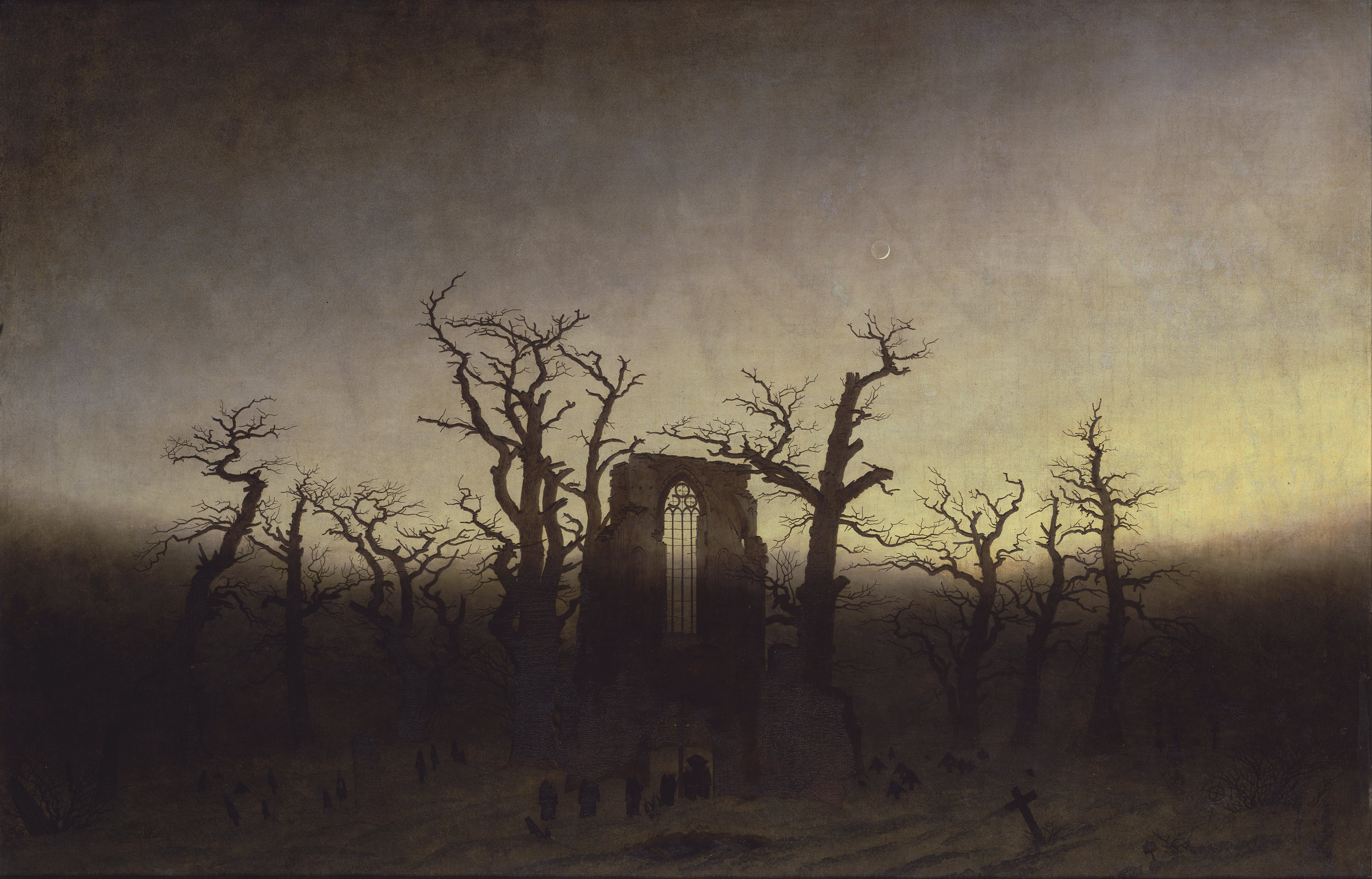
The Abbey in the Oakwood (1808–1810). 110.4 × 171 cm. Alte Nationalgalerie, Berlin. Albert Boime writes, "Like a scene from a horror movie, it brings to bear on the subject all the Gothic clichés of the late eighteenth and early nineteenth centuries."

Friedrich created the idea of a landscape full of romantic feeling—die romantische Stimmungslandschaft. His art details a wide range of geographical features, such as rock coasts, forests and mountain scenes, and often used landscape to express religious themes. During his time, most of the best-known paintings were viewed as expressions of a religious mysticism. He wrote: "The artist should paint not only what he sees before him, but also what he sees within him. If, however, he sees nothing within him, then he should also refrain from painting that which he sees before him. Otherwise, his pictures will be like those folding screens behind which one expects to find only the sick or the dead." Expansive skies, storms, mist, forests, ruins and crosses bearing witness to the presence of God are frequent elements in Friedrich's landscapes. Though death finds symbolic expression in boats moving away from a shore, it is referenced more directly in paintings like The Abbey in the Oakwood (1808–1810), in which monks carry a coffin past an open grave, toward a cross, and through the portal of a church in ruins.

He was one of the first artists to portray winter landscapes in which the land is rendered as stark and dead. Friedrich's winter scenes are solemn and still—according to the art historian Hermann Beenken, Friedrich painted winter scenes in which "no man has yet set his foot. The theme of nearly all the older winter pictures had been less winter itself than life in winter. In the 16th and 17th centuries, it was thought impossible to leave out such motifs as the crowd of skaters, the wanderer ... It was Friedrich who first felt the wholly detached and distinctive features of a natural life. Instead of many tones, he sought the one; and so, in his landscape, he subordinated the composite chord into one single basic note".

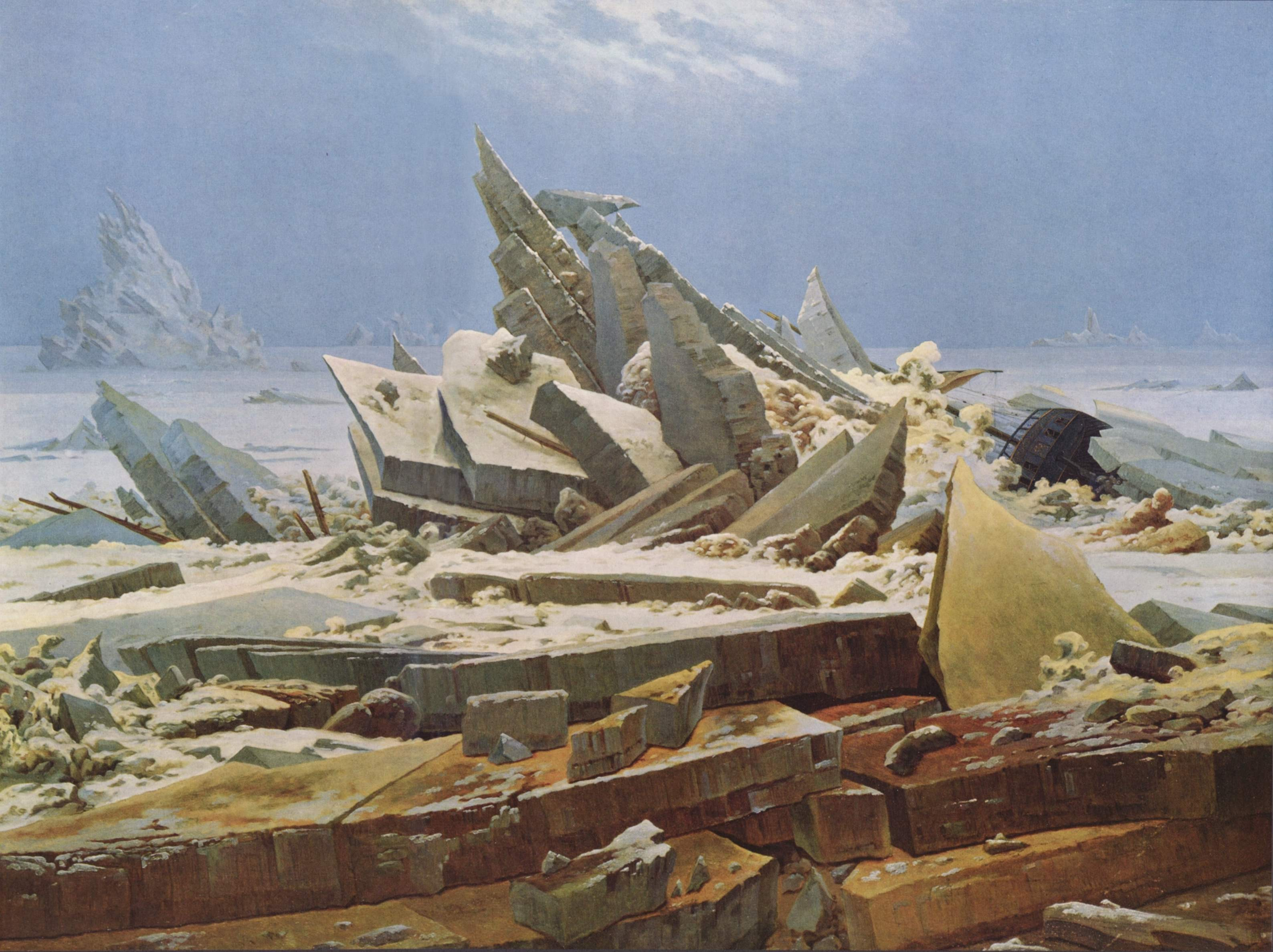
The Sea of Ice (1823–1824), Kunsthalle Hamburg. This scene has been described as "a stunning composition of near and distant forms in an Arctic image".

Bare oak trees and tree stumps, such as those in Raven Tree (c. 1822), Man and Woman Contemplating the Moon (c. 1824), and Willow Bush under a Setting Sun (c. 1835), are recurring elements of his paintings, and usually symbolise death. Countering the sense of despair are Friedrich's symbols for redemption: the cross and the clearing sky promise eternal life, and the slender moon suggests hope and the growing closeness of Christ. In his paintings of the sea, anchors often appear on the shore, also indicating a spiritual hope. In The Abbey in the Oakwood, the movement of the monks away from the open grave and toward the cross and the horizon imparts Friedrich's message that the final destination of man's life lies beyond the grave.

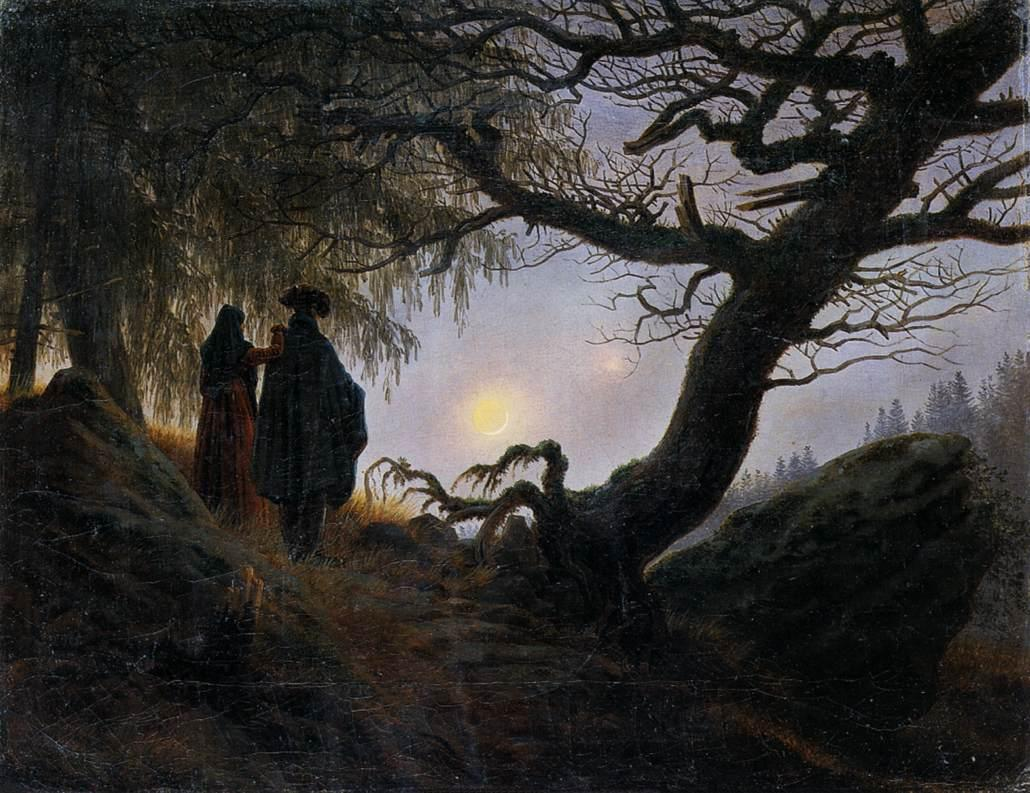
Man and Woman Contemplating the Moon (c. 1824). 34 × 44 cm. Alte Nationalgalerie, Berlin. A couple gaze longingly at nature. Dressed in "Old German" clothes, according to Robert Hughes, they are "scarcely different in tone or modelling from the deep dramas of nature around them".

With dawn and dusk constituting prominent themes of his landscapes, Friedrich's own later years were characterised by a growing pessimism. His work becomes darker, revealing a fearsome monumentality. The Wreck of the Hope—also known as The Polar Sea or The Sea of Ice (1823–1824)—perhaps best summarises Friedrich's ideas and aims at this point, though in such a radical way that the painting was not well received. Completed in 1824, it depicted a grim subject, a shipwreck in the Arctic Ocean; "the image he produced, with its grinding slabs of travertine-colored floe ice chewing up a wooden ship, goes beyond documentary into allegory: the frail bark of human aspiration crushed by the world's immense and glacial indifference."

Friedrich's written commentary on aesthetics was limited to a collection of aphorisms set down in 1830, in which he explained the need for the artist to match natural observation with an introspective scrutiny of his own personality. His best-known remark advises the artist to "close your bodily eye so that you may see your picture first with the spiritual eye. Then bring to the light of day that which you have seen in the darkness so that it may react upon others from the outside inwards."

=== Loneliness and death ===
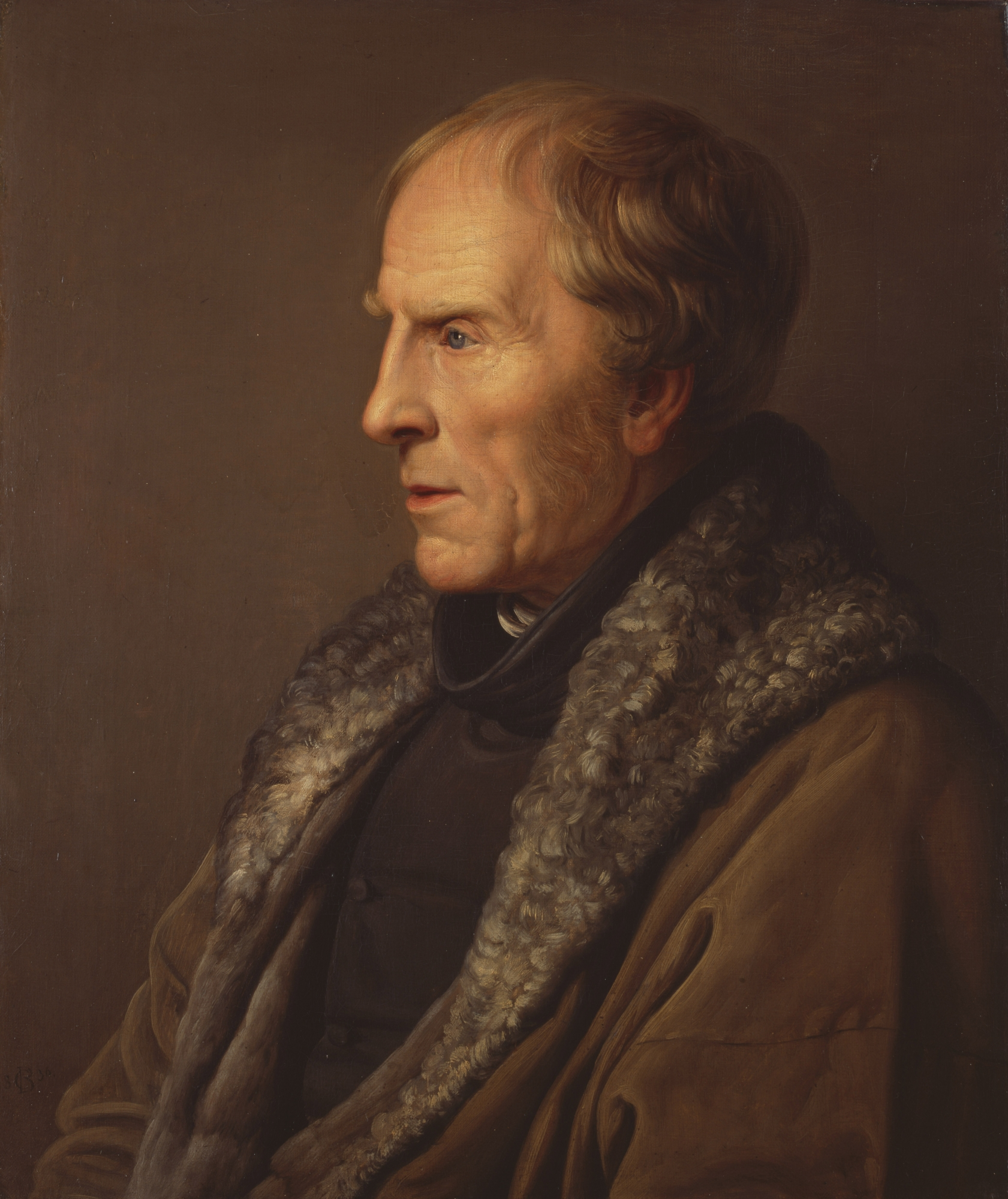
Caspar David Friedrich, by Carl Johann Baehr (1836). New Masters Gallery, Dresden

Both Friedrich's life and art have at times been perceived as marked by an overwhelming sense of loneliness. Art historians and some of his contemporaries attribute such interpretations to the losses suffered during his youth to the bleak outlook of his adulthood, while Friedrich's pale and withdrawn appearance helped reinforce the popular notion of the "taciturn man from the North". (Note: His letters, however, contain humour and self-irony, while the natural philosopher Gotthilf Heinrich von Schubert wrote that Friedrich "was indeed a strange mixture of temperament, his moods ranging from the gravest seriousness to the gayest humour ... But anyone who knew only this side of Friedrich's personality, namely his deep melancholic seriousness, only knew half the man. I have met few people who have such a gift for telling jokes and such a sense of fun as he did, providing that he was in the company of people he liked." Quoted in Börsch-Supan (1974) pp. 16.)

Friedrich suffered depressive episodes in 1799, 1803–1805, c. 1813, in 1816 and between 1824 and 1826. There are noticeable thematic shifts in the works he produced during these episodes, which see the emergence of such motifs and symbols as vultures, owls, graveyards and ruins. From 1826, these motifs became a permanent feature of his output, while his use of colour became darker and muted. Carus wrote in 1829 that Friedrich "is surrounded by a thick, gloomy cloud of spiritual uncertainty", though the noted art historian and curator Hubertus Gassner disagrees with such notions, seeing in Friedrich's work a positive and life-affirming subtext inspired by Freemasonry and religion.

=== Germanic folklore ===
Reflecting Friedrich's patriotism and resentment of the 1813 French occupation of Pomerania, motifs from German folklore became increasingly prominent in his work. An anti-French German nationalist, Friedrich used motifs from his native landscape to celebrate Germanic culture, customs and mythology. He was impressed by the anti-Napoleonic poetry of Ernst Moritz Arndt and Theodor Körner, and the patriotic literature of Adam Müller and Heinrich von Kleist. Moved by the deaths of three friends killed in battle against France, as well as by Kleist's 1808 drama Die Hermannsschlacht, Friedrich undertook a number of paintings in which he intended to convey political symbols solely by means of the landscape—a first in the history of art.

In Old Heroes' Graves (1812), a dilapidated monument inscribed "Arminius" invokes the Germanic chieftain, a symbol of nationalism, while the four tombs of fallen heroes are slightly ajar, freeing their spirits for eternity. Two French soldiers appear as small figures before a cave, lower and deep in a grotto surrounded by rock, as if farther from heaven. A second political painting, Fir Forest with the French Dragoon and the Raven (c. 1813), depicts a lost French soldier dwarfed by a dense forest, while on a tree stump a raven is perched—a prophet of doom, symbolizing the anticipated defeat of France. (Note: The scene is an allusion to Act V, scene 3 of Kleist's Die Hermannsschlacht.)

== Legacy ==
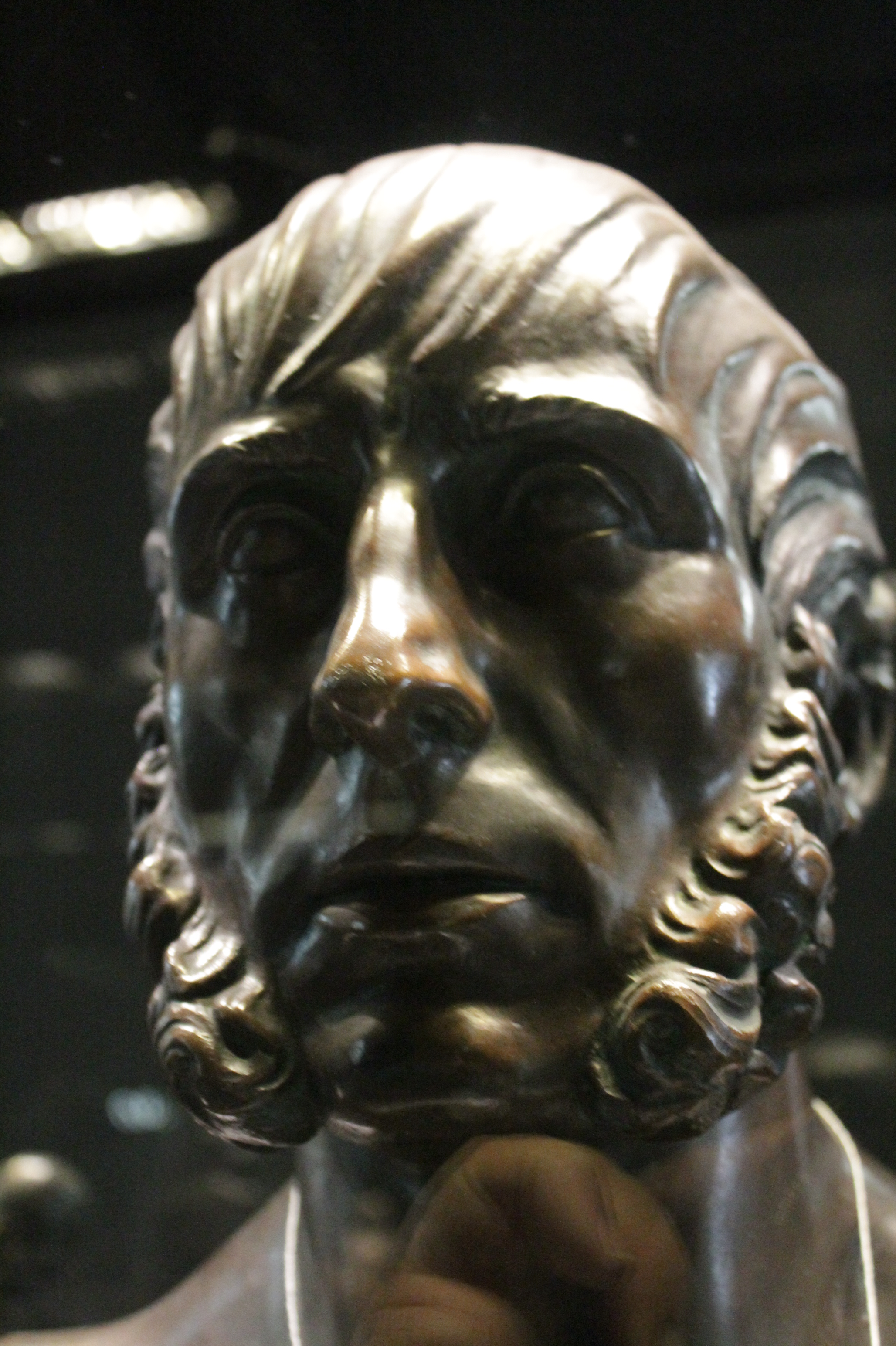
Caspar David Friedrich, by Christian Gottlieb Kuhn (1807), Albertinum, Dresden

=== Influence ===
Alongside other Romantic painters, Friedrich helped position landscape painting as a major genre within Western art. Of his contemporaries, Friedrich's style most influenced the painting of Johan Christian Dahl (1788–1857). Among later generations, Arnold Böcklin (1827–1901) was strongly influenced by his work, and the substantial presence of Friedrich's works in Russian collections influenced many Russian painters, in particular Arkhip Kuindzhi (c. 1842–1910) and Ivan Shishkin (1832–1898). Friedrich's spirituality anticipated American painters such as Albert Pinkham Ryder (1847–1917), Ralph Blakelock (1847–1919), the painters of the Hudson River School and the New England Luminists.

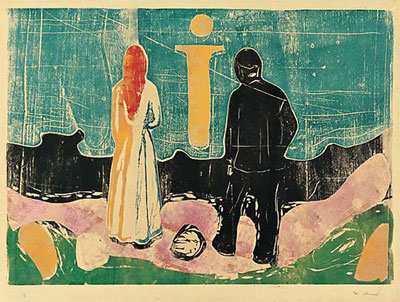
Edvard Munch, The Lonely Ones (1899). Woodcut. Munch Museum, Oslo

At the turn of the 20th century, Friedrich was rediscovered by the Norwegian art historian Andreas Aubert (1851–1913), whose writing initiated modern Friedrich scholarship, and by the Symbolist painters, who valued his visionary and allegorical landscapes. The Norwegian Symbolist Edvard Munch (1863–1944) would have seen Friedrich's work during a visit to Berlin in the 1880s. Munch's 1899 print The Lonely Ones echoes Friedrich's Rückenfigur (back figure), although in Munch's work the focus has shifted away from the broad landscape and toward the sense of dislocation between the two melancholy figures in the foreground.

Friedrich's modern revival gained momentum in 1906, when thirty-two of his works were featured in an exhibition in Berlin of Romantic-era art. His landscapes exercised a strong influence on the work of German artist Max Ernst (1891–1976), and as a result other Surrealists came to view Friedrich as a precursor to their movement. In 1934, the Belgian painter René Magritte (1898–1967) paid tribute in his work The Human Condition, which directly echoes motifs from Friedrich's art in its questioning of perception and the role of the viewer.

A few years later, the Surrealist journal Minotaure included Friedrich in a 1939 article by the critic Marie Landsberger, thereby exposing his work to a far wider circle of artists. The influence of The Wreck of Hope (or The Sea of Ice) is evident in the 1940–41 painting Totes Meer by Paul Nash (1889–1946), a fervent admirer of Ernst. Friedrich's work has been cited as an inspiration by other major 20th-century artists, including Mark Rothko (1903–1970), Gerhard Richter (b. 1932), Gotthard Graubner (Note: According to Werner Hofmann, both Graubner and Friedrich created an aesthetics of monotony as a counterpart to the aesthetics of variety that was predominant before the nineteenth century. See "Kissenkunst, zerrissene Realität", Die Zeit, 19 December 1975.) and Anselm Kiefer (b. 1945). Friedrich's Romantic paintings have also been singled out by writer Samuel Beckett (1906–89), who, standing before Man and Woman Contemplating the Moon, said "This was the source of Waiting for Godot, you know."

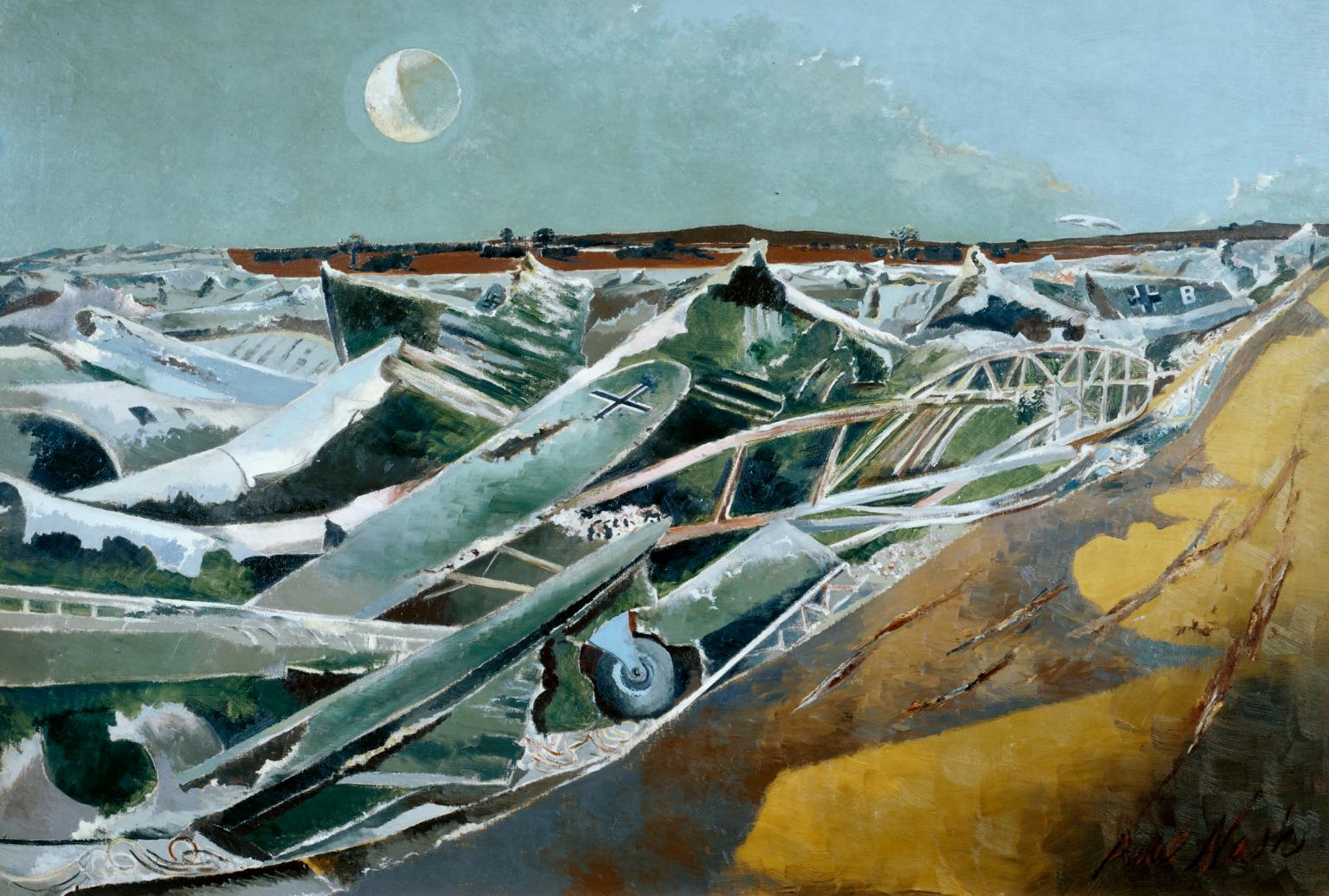
Paul Nash, Totes Meer (Sea of the Dead), 1940–41. 101.6 × 152.4 cm. Tate Gallery. Nash's work depicts a graveyard of crashed German planes comparable to The Sea of Ice (above).

In his 1961 article "The Abstract Sublime", originally published in ARTnews, the art historian Robert Rosenblum drew comparisons between the Romantic landscape paintings of both Friedrich and Turner with the Abstract Expressionist paintings of Mark Rothko. Rosenblum specifically describes Friedrich's 1809 painting The Monk by the Sea, Turner's The Evening Star and Rothko's 1954 Light, Earth and Blue as revealing affinities of vision and feeling. According to Rosenblum, "Rothko, like Friedrich and Turner, places us on the threshold of those shapeless infinities discussed by the aestheticians of the Sublime. The tiny monk in the Friedrich and the fisher in the Turner establish a poignant contrast between the infinite vastness of a pantheistic God and the infinite smallness of His creatures. In the abstract language of Rothko, such literal detail—a bridge of empathy between the real spectator and the presentation of a transcendental landscape—is no longer necessary; we ourselves are the monk before the sea, standing silently and contemplatively before these huge and soundless pictures as if we were looking at a sunset or a moonlit night."

=== Critical appraisal ===
Until 1890, and especially after his friends had died, Friedrich's work lay in near-oblivion for decades. Yet, by 1890, the symbolism in his work began to ring true with the artistic mood of the day, especially in central Europe. However, despite a renewed interest and an acknowledgment of his originality, his lack of regard for "painterly effect" and thinly rendered surfaces jarred with the theories of the time.

Friedrich's work was used to promote the Nazi ideology in the 1930s, when attempts were made to align Romantic artist and musicians within the nationalistic Blut und Boden ethos. It took decades for Friedrich's reputation to recover from this association with Nazism. His reliance on symbolism and the fact that his work fell outside the narrow definitions of modernism contributed to his fall from favour. In 1949, art historian Kenneth Clark wrote that Friedrich "worked in the frigid technique of his time, which could hardly inspire a school of modern painting", and suggested that the artist was trying to express in painting what is best left to poetry. Clark's dismissal of Friedrich reflected the damage the artist's reputation sustained during the late 1930s.

Friedrich's reputation suffered further damage when his imagery was adopted by a number of Hollywood directors, including Walt Disney, built on the work of such German cinema masters as Fritz Lang and F. W. Murnau, within the horror and fantasy genres. His rehabilitation was slow, but enhanced through the writings of such critics and scholars as Werner Hofmann, Helmut Börsch-Supan and Sigrid Hinz, who successfully rebutted the political associations ascribed to his work, developed a catalogue raisonné, and placed Friedrich within a purely art-historical context.

By the 1970s, he was again being exhibited in major international galleries and found favour with a new generation of critics and art historians. Today, his international reputation is well established. He is a national icon in his native Germany, and highly regarded by art historians and connoisseurs across the Western World. He is generally viewed as a figure of great psychological complexity, and according to Vaughan, "a believer who struggled with doubt, a celebrator of beauty haunted by darkness. In the end, he transcends interpretation, reaching across cultures through the compelling appeal of his imagery. He has truly emerged as a butterfly—hopefully one that will never again disappear from our sight".

== Work ==
Friedrich was a prolific artist who produced more than 500 attributed works. In line with the Romantic ideals of his time, he intended his paintings to function as pure aesthetic statements, so he was cautious that the titles given to his work were not overly descriptive or evocative. It is likely that some of today's more literal titles, such as The Stages of Life, were not given by the artist himself, but were instead adopted during one of the revivals of interest in Friedrich. Complications arise when dating Friedrich's work, in part because he often did not directly name or date his canvases. He kept a carefully detailed notebook on his output, however, which has been used by scholars to tie paintings to their completion dates.

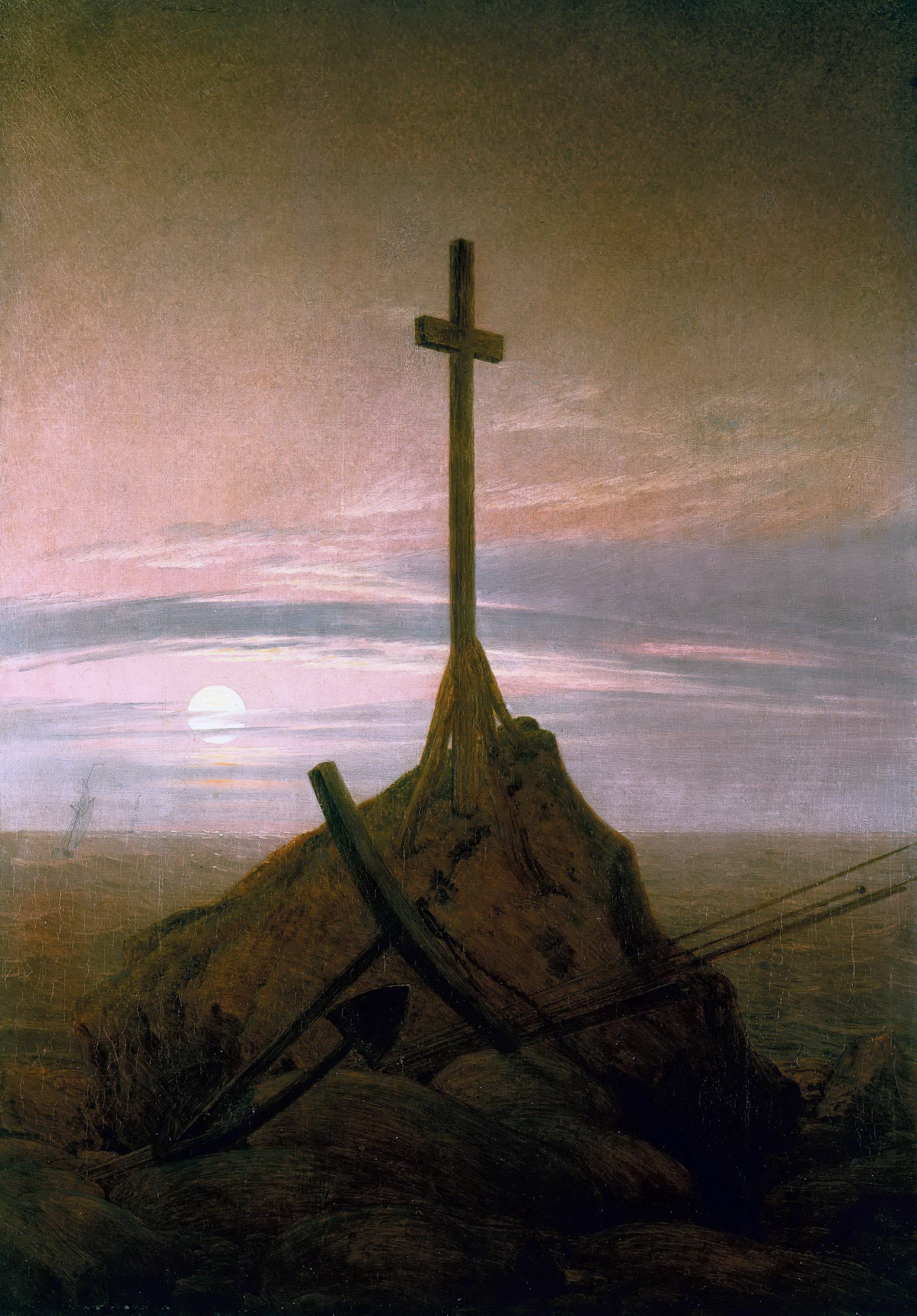
The Cross Beside The Baltic (1815), 45 × 33.5 cm. Schloss Charlottenburg, Berlin. This painting marked a move away from depictions in broad daylight, to return to nocturnal scenes, twilight and a deeper poignancy of mood.

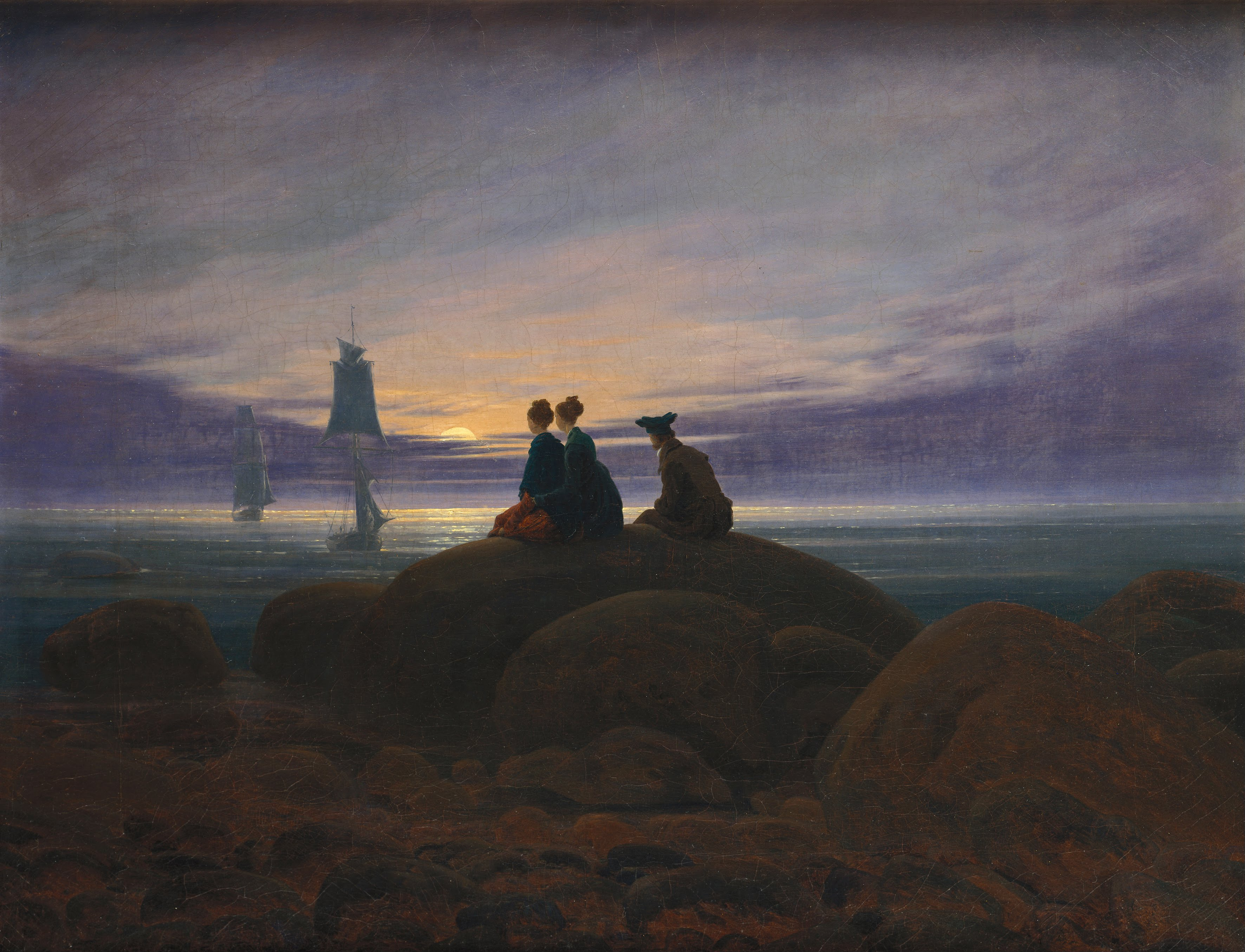
Moonrise over the Sea (1822). 55 × 71 cm. Alte Nationalgalerie, Berlin. From the early 1820s, human figures appear with increasing frequency in his paintings.

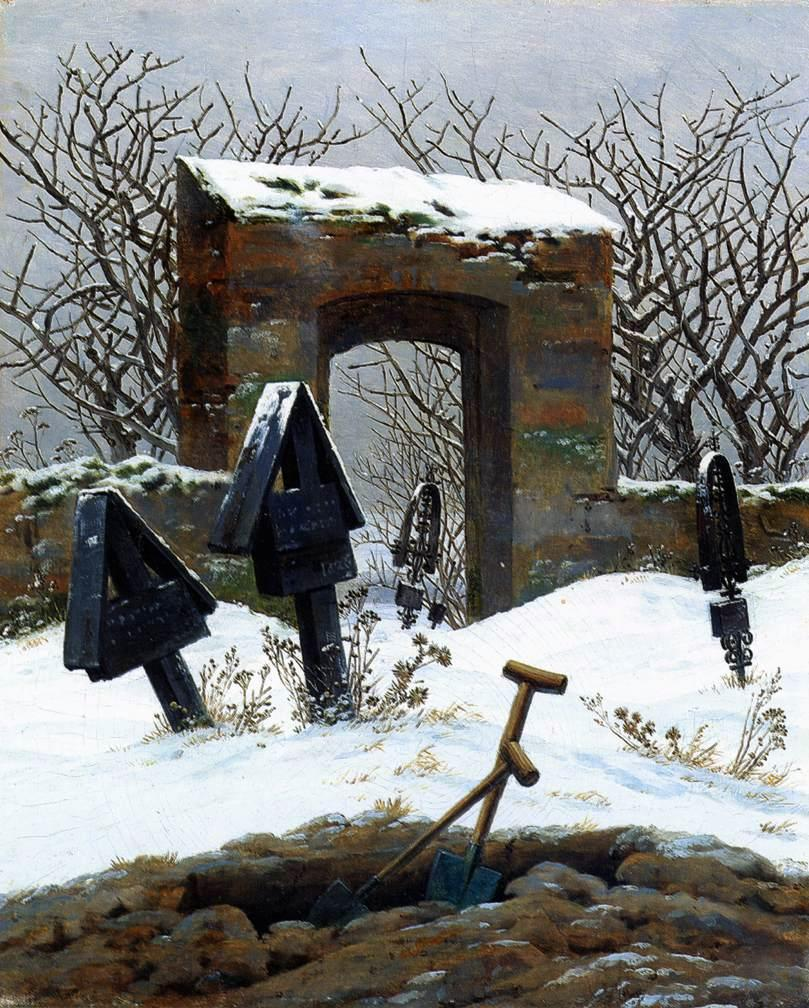
Graveyard under Snow (1826). 31 × 25 cm. Museum der bildenden Künste, Leipzig. Friedrich sketched memorial monuments and sculptures for mausoleums, reflecting his obsession with death and the afterlife. He also created some of the funerary art in Dresden's cemeteries.

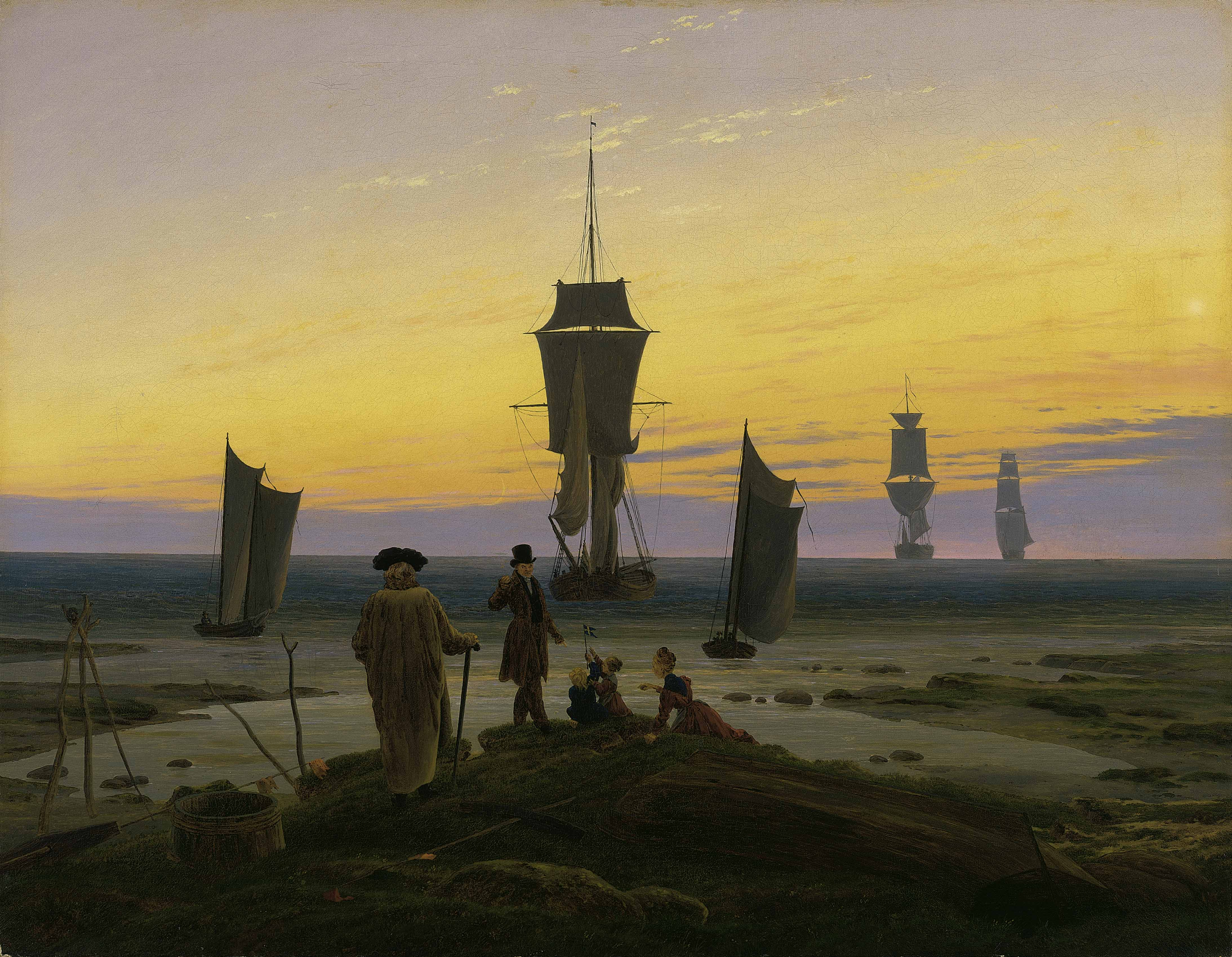
The Stages of Life (1835). Museum der Bildenden Künste, Leipzig. The Stages of Life is a meditation on the artist's mortality, depicting five ships at various distances. The foreground similarly shows five figures at different stages of life.

== Sources ==
- Beenken, Hermann (1938). "Caspar David Friedrich". The Burlington Magazine for Connoisseurs. 72 (421): 171–175. JSTOR 867281.
- Boime, Albert (1990). Art in an Age of Bonapartism, 1800–1815: A Social History of Modern Art. Vol. 2. Chicago: University of Chicago Press. ISBN 978-0-226-06335-5.
- Börsch-Supan, Helmut (1972). "Caspar David Friedrich's Landscapes with Self-Portraits". The Burlington Magazine. 114 (834): 620–630. JSTOR 877126.
- Börsch-Supan, Helmut (1974). Caspar David Friedrich. Twohig, Sarah (tr.). New York: George Braziller. ISBN 978-0-8076-0747-3.
- Causey, Andrew (1980). Paul Nash. Oxford: Clarendon Press. ISBN 978-0-1981-7348-9.
- Clark, Kenneth (2007). Landscape into Art. London: Gibb Press. ISBN 978-1-4067-2824-8.
- Dahlenburg, Birgit; Carsten, Spitzer (2005). "Major Depression and Stroke in Caspar David Friedrich". In Bogousslavsky, Julien; Boller, François (eds.). Neurological Disorders in Famous Artists. Frontiers of Neurology and Neuroscience. Vol. 19. Basel: S. Karger AG. pp. 112–120. doi:10.1159/000085609. ISBN 978-3-8055-7914-8.
- Elger, Dietmar (2009). Gerhard Richter: A Life in Painting. Chicago: University of Press. ISBN 978-0-2262-0323-2.
- Forster-Hahn, Françoise (March 1976). "Recent Scholarship on Caspar David Friedrich". The Art Bulletin. 58 (1): 113–116. doi:10.2307/3049469. JSTOR 3049469.
- Grewe, Cordula (May 2006). "Heaven on Earth: Cordula Grewe on Caspar David Friedrich". Artforum International. 44 (9).
- Griffiths, Antony; Carey, Francis (1994). German Printmaking in the Age of Goethe. London: British Museum Press. ISBN 978-0-7141-1659-4.
- Hinz, Sigrid, ed. (1974). Caspar David Friedrich in Briefen und Bekenntnissen (in German). Berlin: Henschelverlag Kunst und Gesellschaft. ISBN 3-8077-0019-6.
- Irwin, David (1990). Academic American Encyclopedia. Danbury: Grolier. ISBN 0-7172-2029-X.
- Johnston, Catherine; Leppien, Helmut R.; Monrad, Kasper (1999). Baltic Light: Early Open-Air Painting in Denmark and North Germany. New Haven: Yale University Press. ISBN 978-0-3000-8166-4.
- Koerner, Joseph Leo (2002). Caspar David Friedrich and the Subject of Landscape. New Haven and London: Yale University Press. ISBN 978-1-86189-439-7.
- Larisey, Peter (1993). Light for a Cold Land: Lawren Harris's Life and Work. Toronto: Dundurn. ISBN 978-1-5500-2188-2.
- Miller, Philip B. (1974). "Anxiety and Abstraction: Kleist and Brentano on Caspar David Friedrich". Art Journal. 33 (3): 205–210. doi:10.1080/00043249.1974.10793215. JSTOR 775782.
- Mitchell, Timothy (September 1984). "Caspar David Friedrich's Der Watzmann: German Romantic Landscape Painting and Historical Geology". The Art Bulletin. 66 (3): 452–464. doi:10.1080/00043079.1984.10788189. JSTOR 3050447.
- Murray, Christopher John (2004). Encyclopedia of the Romantic Era, 1760–1850. London: Taylor & Francis. ISBN 1-57958-422-5.
- Prettejohn, Elizabeth (2005). Beauty & Art, 1750–2000. Oxford: Oxford University Press. ISBN 978-0-1928-0160-9.
- Schmied, Wieland (1995). Caspar David Friedrich. New York: H.N. Abrams. ISBN 978-0-8109-3327-9.
- Schmitz, Matthias (1940). Caspar David Friedrich: His Life and Work. German Library of Information.
- Schütz, Sabine (1991). "Color-Space Bodies: The Art of Gotthard Graubner". Arts Magazine. 65.
- Siegel, Linda (1974). "Synaesthesia and the Paintings of Caspar David Friedrich". The Art Journal. 33 (3): 196–204. doi:10.1080/00043249.1974.10793214. JSTOR 775782.
- Siegel, Linda (1978). Caspar David Friedrich and the Age of German Romanticism. Boston: Branden Publishing Co. ISBN 978-0-8283-1659-0.
- Vaughan, William; Börsch-Supan, Helmut; Neidhardt, Hans Joachim (1972). Caspar David Friedrich 1774-1840. Romantic landscape painting in Dresden. London: The Tate Gallery. ISBN 0-900874-35-X.
- Vaughan, William (1980). German Romantic Painting. New Haven: Yale University Press. ISBN 978-0-3000-2387-9.
- Vaughan, William (1991). "Reviewed Works: 'The Romantic Vision of Caspar David Friedrich' + 'Painting and Drawings from the USSR' by Sabine Rewald'". Burlington Magazine. 133 (1062). JSTOR 884854.
- Vaughan, William (2004). Friedrich. Oxford: Phaidon Press. ISBN 978-0-7148-4060-4.
- Whittington, Karl (2012). "Caspar David Friedrich's Medieval Burials". Nineteenth-Century Art Worldwide. 11 (1): 74–96. ProQuest 3239343375
- Wolf, Norbert (2003). Caspar David Friedrich. Köln: Taschen. ISBN 978-3-8228-2293-7.
