= Smarthistory =

Internet properties established in 2005

- Type: Non-profit organization
- Industry: Education
- Founded: 2005; 21 years ago
- Headquarters: New York City
- Key people: Beth Harris; Steven Zucker
- Services: Videos and essays on art and cultural history
- Revenue: 980,741 United States dollar (2022)
- Total assets: 1,743,864 United States dollar (2022)
- Website: smarthistory.org

Smarthistory is a free resource for the study of art history created by art historians Beth Harris and Steven Zucker. Smarthistory is an independent nonprofit organization and the official partner of the Khan Academy for art history. It is funded by the National Endowment for the Humanities.

== History ==
Smarthistory started in 2005 as an audio guide series for use at the Metropolitan Museum of Art, The Museum of Modern Art in New York City, and as a resource for students taking introductory art history courses at the college level. In addition to its focus on college-level courses in art history, Smarthistory supports the art history Advanced Placement course and examination developed by The College Board. Smarthistory provides essays, videos, photographs, and links to additional resources for all of the art and architecture that make up the AP art history curriculum.

Smarthistory has published more than 880 videos and 2,000 essays on art and cultural history from the Paleolithic era to the 21st century that include the art of Africa, the Americas, Asia, Europe, and Oceania. Smarthistory's essays have been contributed by more than 200 art historians, curators, and archaeologists writing in their areas of focus and are peer-reviewed. Videos are unscripted conversations between experts recorded on location in front of the original work of art or architecture.

External videos
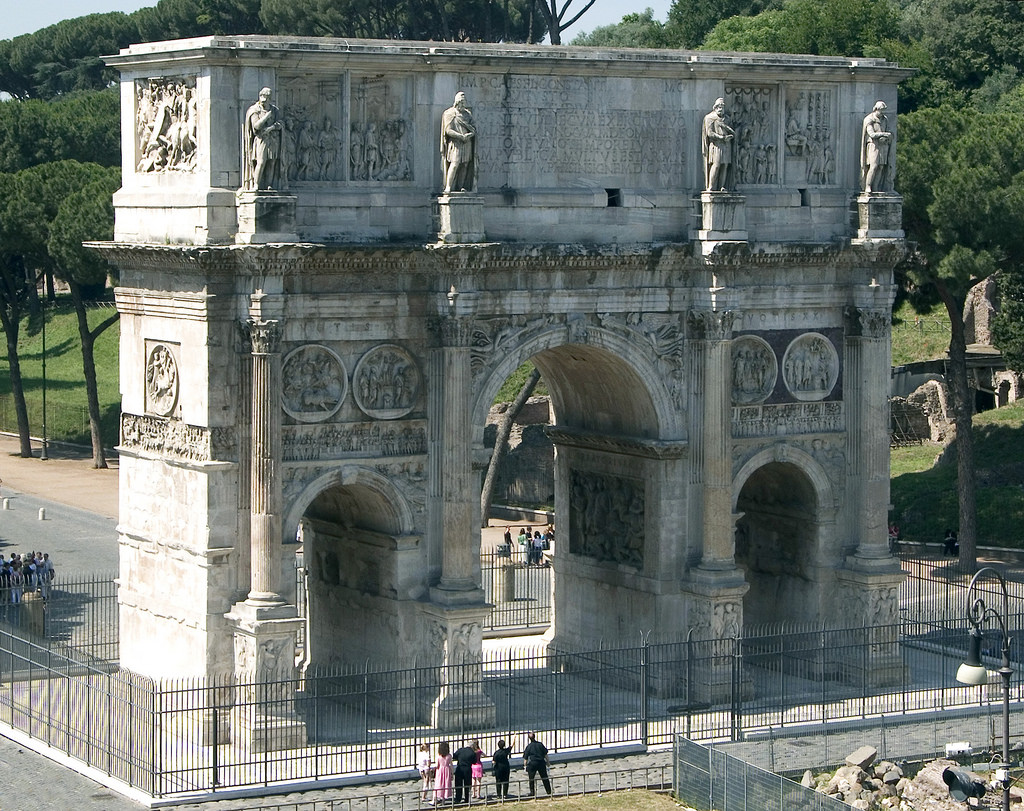
- Arch of Constantine, a typical Smarthistory video

In an article in the Brooklyn New York Daily News, staff writer Elizabeth Lazarowitz quotes Steven Zucker, "Art can be really intimidating for people", said Zucker. "If we can make art feel exciting and interesting and very much relevant to a historical moment...art can have real meaning." Unlike reading about art in a book, "the idea of the audio was to keep a student's eyes on the image", he explained. "It helped students to learn the material a lot better."

== Awards & grants ==
Smarthistory won the Webby Award for Education in 2009. The Samuel H. Kress Foundation gave them a $25,000 grant for development in 2008 and a $38,000 partnership development grant with the Portland Art Museum in 2009.
