= We Are Making a New World =

Painting by Paul Nash

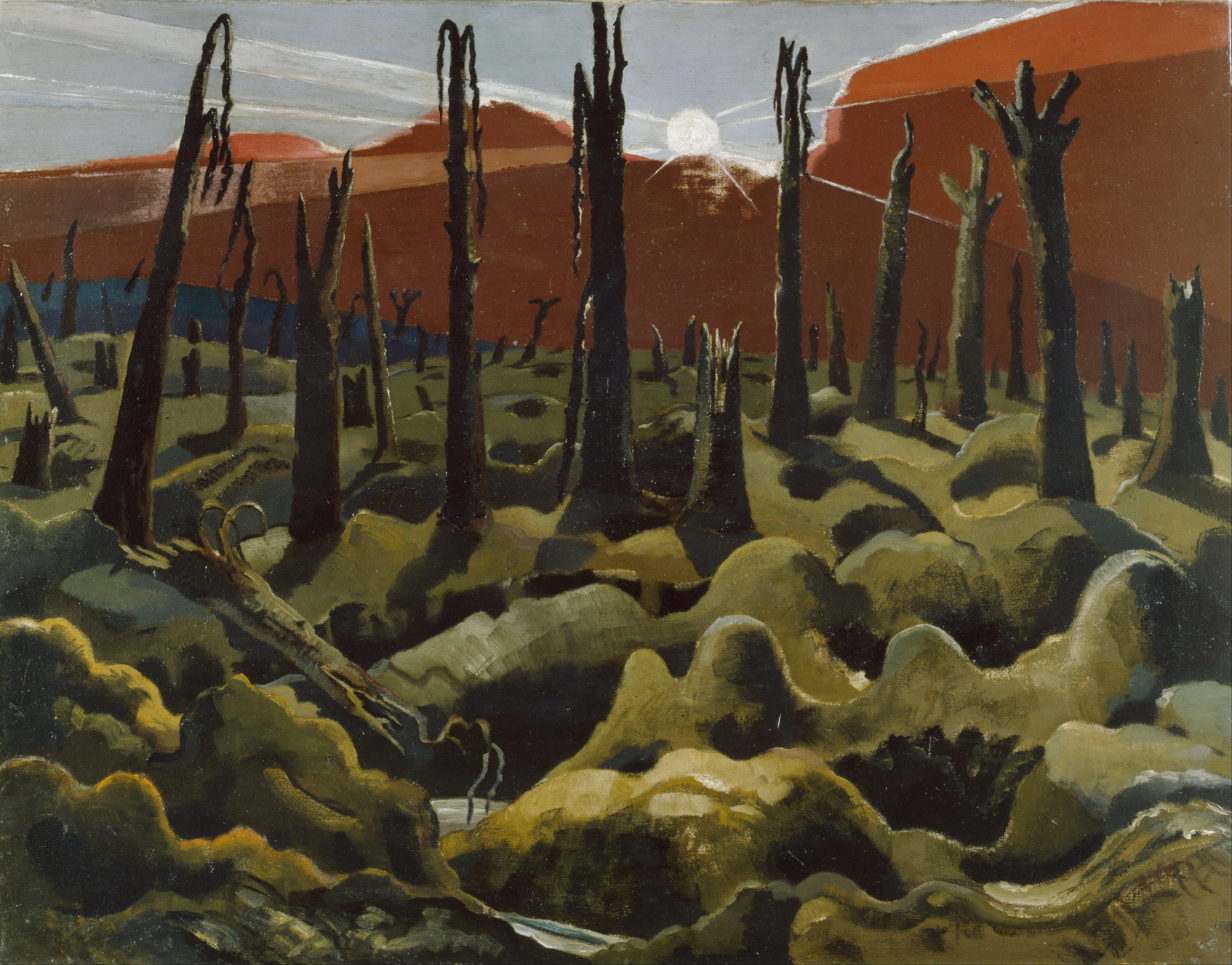
- Artist: Paul Nash
- Year: 1918
- Medium: oil on canvas
- Dimensions: 71.1 cm × 91.4 cm (28.0 in × 36.0 in)
- Location: Imperial War Museum, London

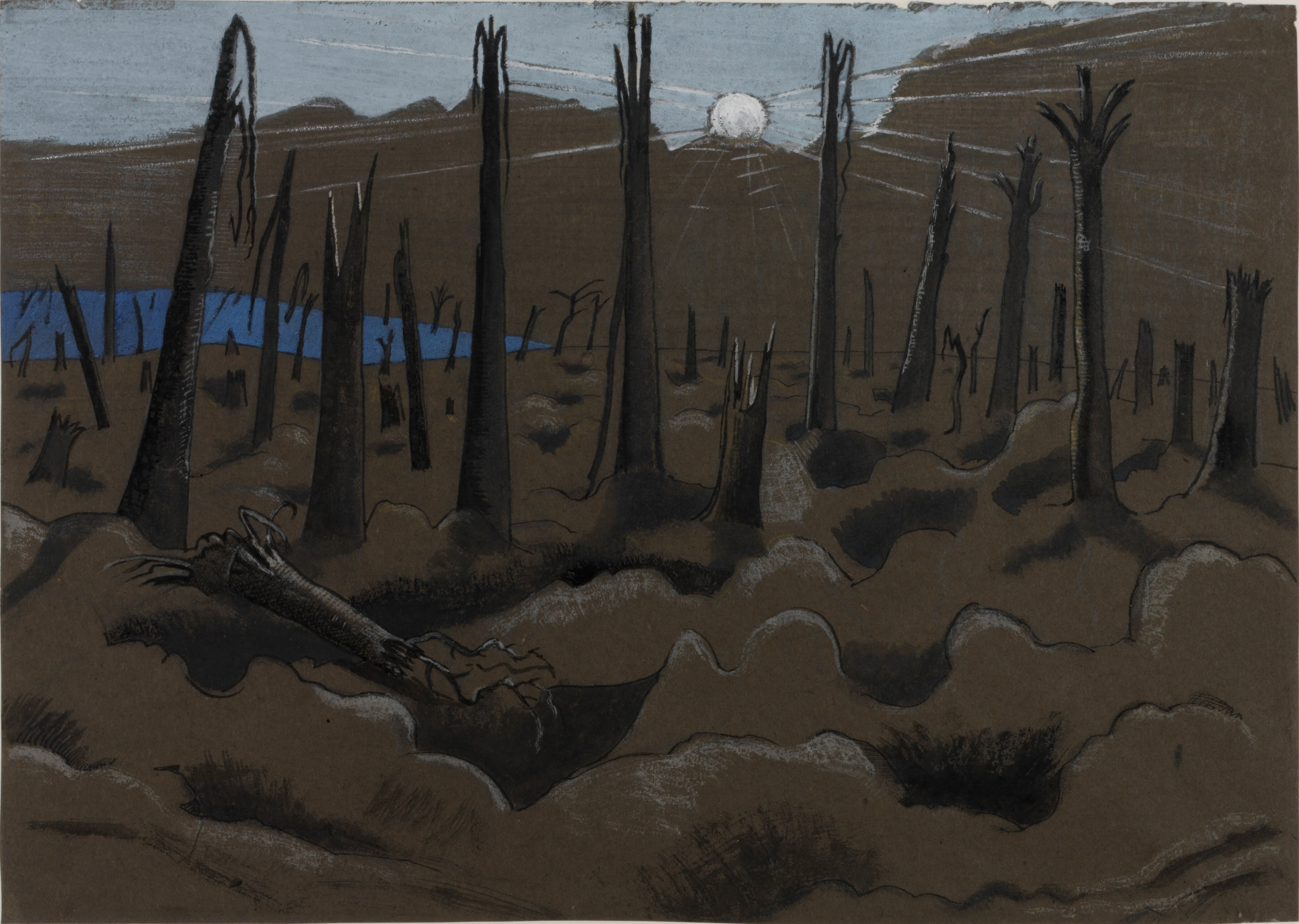
Sunrise, Inverness Copse, the 1918 drawing on which the painting was based.

We Are Making a New World is an oil-on-canvas painting by Paul Nash, from 1918. It is held at the Imperial War Museum, in London.

== History and description ==
The optimistic title contrasts with Nash's depiction of a scarred landscape created by a battle of the First World War, with shell-holes, mounds of earth, and leafless tree trunks. Nash's first major painting and his most famous work, it has been described as one of the best British paintings of the 20th century, and compared to Picasso's Guernica. "Yet it is worth remembering that the picture was a piece of official art and that it first appeared, untitled, as the cover of an issue of British War Artists at the Front, published by Country Life. ... [It] was promulgated in 1917 as covert propaganda for the Allied cause."

Among the first oil paintings produced by Nash, the work was based on his 1918 pen-and-ink drawing Sunrise, Inverness Copse, which depicts the remains of a small group of trees at Inverness Copse, near Ypres in Belgium. Both works were exhibited in a solo exhibition entitled "The Void of War" at the Leicester Galleries in May 1918.

Nash enlisted shortly after the outbreak of the First World War with the Artists' Rifles; after transferring to the Hampshire Regiment, he was sent to the front at Ypres. His passionate attachment to the natural world caused him to regard with horror the deformation brought about by the war.

In 1917 Nash returned to England, having broken several ribs in a fall into a trench. Soon afterwards the Battle of Passchendaele took place which left 200,000 British killed or wounded. Nash lobbied the Foreign Office to be allowed to return to the front as an official war artist. He wrote to his wife Margaret : "I am no longer an artist...I am a messenger who will bring back word from the men who are fighting to those who want the war to go on for ever..."

The painting depicts a bright white sun rising above ruddy brown clouds, shining beams onto a desolated green landscape below, with unnatural mounds of earth piled up between the skeletal remains of blasted trees. Nash's style is developed from Cubism and Vorticism.
