= Sunrise, Inverness Copse =

Painting by Paul Nash

Coordinates: 50°50′32.35″N 2°58′6.90″E

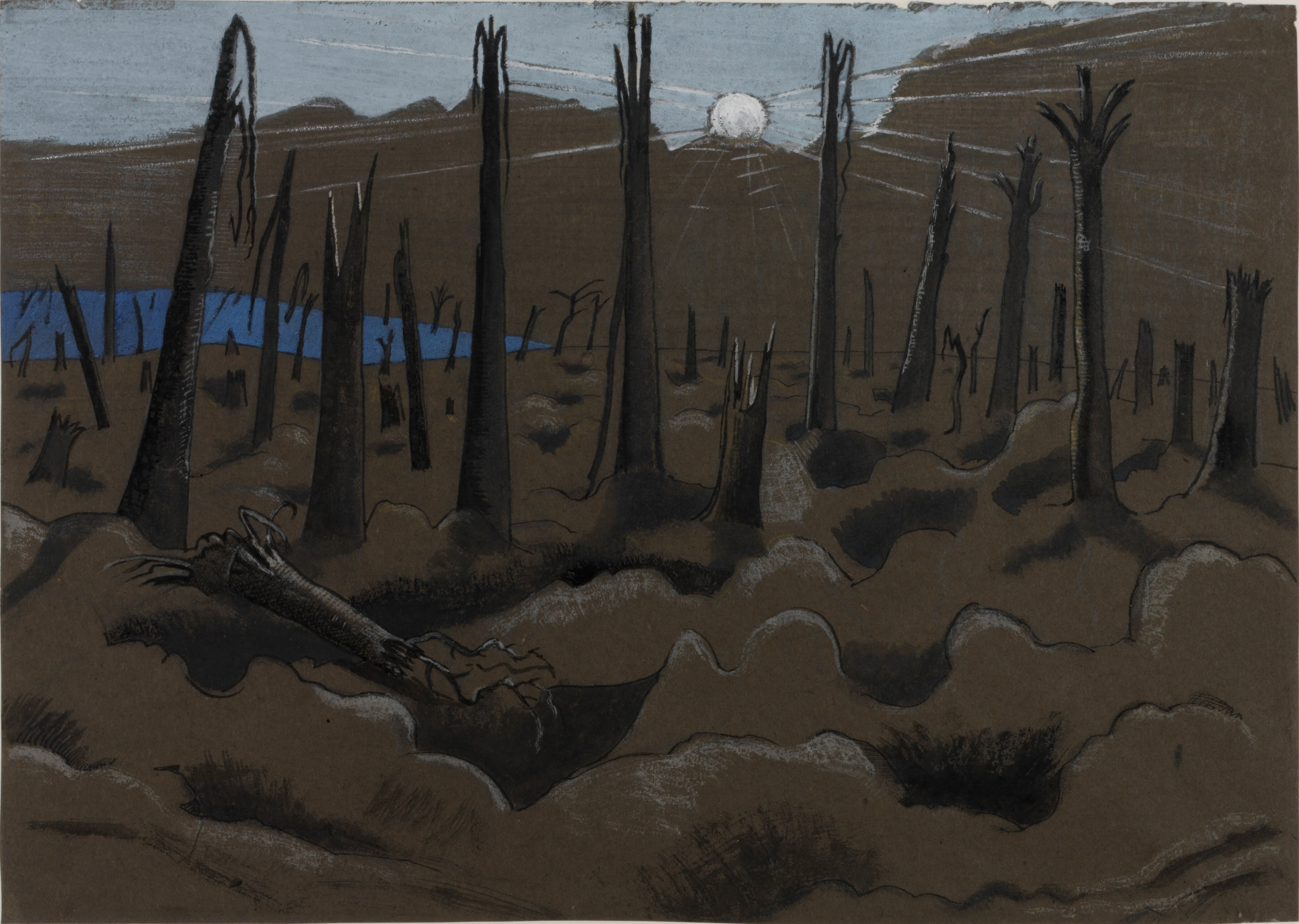
- Artist: Paul Nash
- Year: 1918
- Medium: Watercolour
- Dimensions: 46.8 cm × 61 cm (18.4 in × 24 in)
- Location: Imperial War Museum, London

Sunrise, Inverness Copse is a watercolour by English artist Paul Nash, from 1918. It was produced during the final year of World War I and depicts a scene from the Western Front near Ypres in Belgium. It was developed from an eye-witness sketch which Nash drew whilst at the scene in 1917. The drawing is in the Imperial War Museum, in London.

== Artist ==
Born in Kensington, London, England, in 1889, Paul Nash served in the Artists Rifles following the outbreak of World War I. He was subsequently commissioned as an officer in the Royal Hampshire Regiment. He was sent to Flanders in February 1917, but was invalided back to London in May 1917, a few days before his unit was nearly obliterated at the Battle of Messines. Nash became an official war artist and returned to the Ypres Salient, where he was shocked by the devastation caused by war. In six weeks on the Western Front, he completed what he called "fifty drawings of muddy places on the Front", one of which was Sunrise, Inverness Copse.

== Painting ==
Sunrise, Inverness Copse depicts the Western Front during World War I, at Inverness Copse close to Ypres in Belgium. It is set in 1917, following the bloody Battle of Passchendaele. Nash drew it as a sketch at the location of the battle in 1917 and then developed it into a full watercolour in 1918, following his return to England.

The drawing shows a muddy field of broken trees, lacking colour, with a lake and clouds in the background. The scene is illuminated by a faint sun whose rays lack penetration. Art historians are divided as to whether the picture represents hope of a better future or is fundamentally pessimistic in nature. Richard Cork wrote that "there is still a hope, in this otherwise dejected study, that light and heat will one day nurture the graveyard of nature's forms". But other sources opine that despite the title and the image of the rising sun, Nash does not intend us to view this positively. Nash wrote in a letter around this time that "sunset and sunrise are blasphemous, they are mockeries to man".

== Legacy ==
Later in 1918 Nash painted another picture of the same scene, titled We Are Making a New World, which was based on Sunrise, Inverness Copse. The later painting is now widely regarded as Nash's most famous work. Art critic Ben Lewis has described it as "one of Britain’s best paintings of the 20th century: our very own Guernica".
