= Gheluvelt Plateau actions, July–August 1917 =

- Part of the Third Battle of Ypres in the First World War
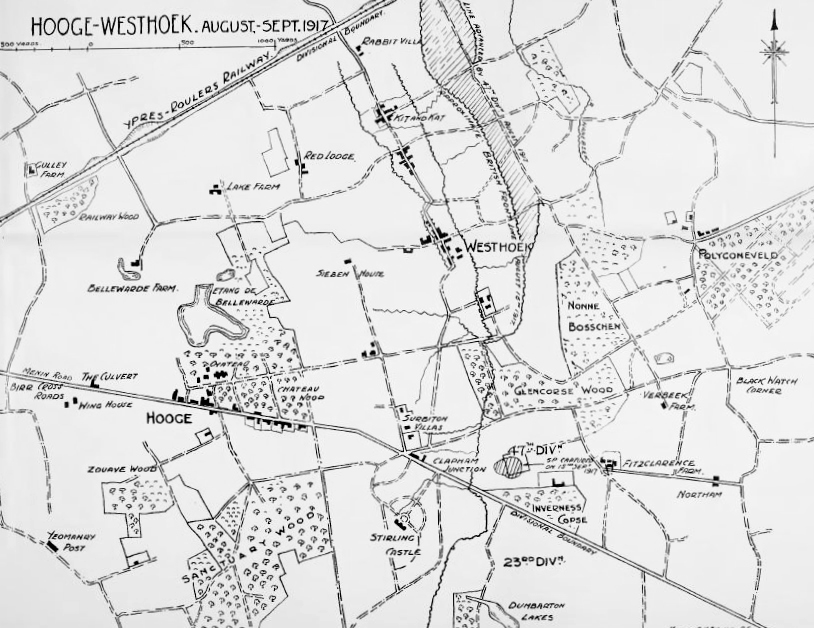
- Gheluvelt Plateau: Inverness Copse, Westhoek and Glencorse Wood
Date	31 July – 31 August 1917
Location	West Flanders, Belgium 50°50′37″N 02°58′18.6″E
Result	German victory

Belligerents
British Empire; United Kingdom	German Empire

Commanders and leaders
Douglas Haig	Crown Prince Rupprecht

Strength
II Corps	Gruppe Ypern
- Gheluvelt Plateau: Hooge, Inverness Copse and Glencorse Wood

The Gheluvelt Plateau actions, July–August 1917 took place from 31 July to 27 August, during the Third Battle of Ypres (31 July – 10 November 1917) in Belgium, in the First World War. The British Fifth Army and the German 4th Army fought for possession of the plateau at the highest part of the ridges to the south-east, east and north-east of Ypres in West Flanders. The 4th Army had been building defensive positions in the Ypres Salient since 1915 and the Gheluvelt Plateau was the most fortified section of the front. The Fifth Army had made the plateau its main objective during the Battle of Pilckem Ridge (31 July – 2 August) but the II Corps advance was contained short of its objectives and German counter-attacks later recaptured some ground.

The ground had been churned by artillery-fire and beginning late on 31 July, torrential rains lasted until 5 August, turning the ground into a sea of mud and flooded shell craters. An attack by II Corps on 2 August, postponed to 10 August, led to the Capture of Westhoek but Inverness Copse, Glencorse Wood and Nonne Bosschen were re-captured by German counter-attacks. The German defensive success was costly even with new tactics and began to concern German commanders. In a dry spell, the Fifth Army attacked again at the Battle of Langemarck (16–18 August) but II Corps was again repulsed by counter-attacks of the German ground-holding divisions and their supporting Eingreif (specialist counter-attack) divisions. The Royal Flying Corps flew more battlefield reconnaissance and ground attack sorties but a German hasty counter-attack (Gegenstoß) overran a brigade of the 56th (1/1st London) Division, leaving British troops further north outflanked, forcing them to retreat.

On 22 August, the 14th (Light) Division captured Inverness Copse and then lost it to a German methodical counter-attack (Gegenangriff) on 24 August. A tank–infantry attack failed on 27 August, when the tanks bogged down and another attempt was cancelled on 31 August. The sodden ground hampered all movement, made tank operations almost impossible and smothered shell explosions. Low cloud and fog obstructed communication between the front line and rear, impeding liaison between British artillery and their observation aircraft. Despite considerable tactical refinements by the British, the German defenders, who had to endure the same exhausting and morale-sapping conditions, held on at Inverness Copse and Glencorse Wood. British morale fell so low that some men were taken prisoner without a fight; the Germans found them bitter over their failures but the success of the 4th Army was costly in casualties.

After 24 August, Field Marshal Sir Douglas Haig, the British Expeditionary Force (BEF) commander, moved the Fifth Army–Second Army boundary again, this time northwards to the Ypres–Roulers railway and relieved II Corps with the I Anzac Corps and X Corps. After a three-week lull to improve communications, during which the rains stopped and the ground dried, the British captured much of the Plateau on 20 September, during the Battle of the Menin Road Ridge (20–26 September). In 1929, John Charteris, the BEF head of intelligence from 1915 to 1918, wrote contradictory remarks about the August climate in Flanders, which influenced later writers. The official historian, James Edmonds rebutted Charteris in 1948 and also criticised Gough, despite including much contrary evidence. In 1996, Prior and Wilson wrote that Gough had planned attritional "bite and hold" operations, rather than attempts to break through the German defences, contrary to claims by many other writers, including the official historian.

== Background ==
=== Topography ===
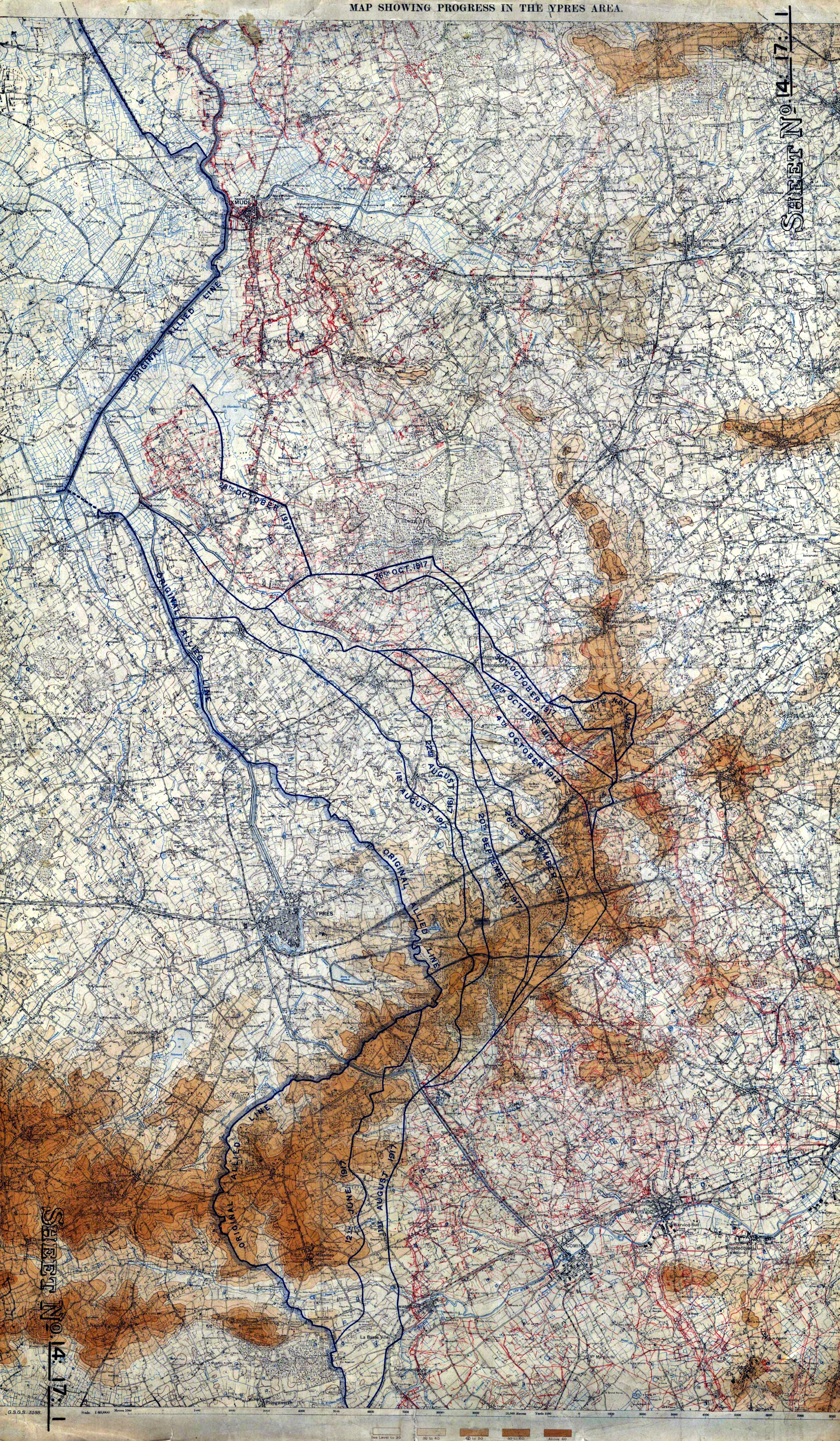
Map showing topography and locations in the Ypres district, detailing British and French advances at Ypres, 1917

Ypres is overlooked from the south-west by Kemmelberg (Kemmel Hill) and from the east by low hills running south-west to north-east, with Wytschaete (Wijtschate) and Hill 60 to the south of Verbrandenmolen (50°49′31.9″N 2°55′16.5″E), Hooge, Polygon Wood and Passchendaele (Passendale). Wytschaete is 7,000 yd (4.0 mi; 6.4 km) from Ypres, at Hollebeke the ridge is 4,000 yd (2.3 mi; 3.7 km) distant and recedes to 7,000 yd (4.0 mi; 6.4 km) distant at Polygon Wood. Wytschaete is the highest point, about 150 ft (46 m) above the plain; on the Ypres–Menin road at Hooge, the elevation is about 100 ft (30 m) and is 70 ft (21 m) at Passchendaele. The rises are slight, apart from the vicinity of Zonnebeke, which has a gradient of 1:33. From Hooge and to the east, the slope is 1:60 and near Hollebeke, it is 1:75; the height variations are subtle and resemble a saucer lip around the city. The main ridge has spurs sloping east and the spur at Wytschaete runs 2 mi (3.2 km) south-east to Messines, with a gentle slope to the east and a 1:10 decline to the west. Further south is the muddy valley of the Douve river, Ploegsteert Wood (Plugstreet to the British) and Hill 63. West of Messines Ridge is the parallel Wulverghem (Spanbroekmolen) Spur, with the Oosttaverne Spur, also parallel, further to the east. The general aspect south and east of Ypres is one of low ridges and dips, gradually flattening northwards beyond Passchendaele into a featureless plain.

Possession of the higher ground to the south and east of Ypres gave the Germans easy observation, plenty of opportunities for enfilade fire and converging artillery bombardments. The 4th Army could also move artillery, reinforcements, supplies and stores in dead ground. The ridge had woods from Wytschaete to Zonnebeke giving good cover, some being of notable size like Polygon Wood and those named Battle Wood, Shrewsbury Forest and Sanctuary Wood by the British. In 1914, the woods contained undergrowth but by 1917, artillery bombardments had reduced the woods to a wilderness of tree stumps, shattered tree trunks and barbed wire lying tangled on the ground amid shell-holes; fields between the woods were 800–1,000 yd (730–910 m) wide and devoid of cover. Roads in this area were unpaved, except for the main ones from Ypres, with occasional villages and houses along them. In 1914, the lowland west of the ridge had been a mixture of meadow and fields, with high hedgerows dotted with trees, cut by streams and ditches emptying into canals. The main road to Ypres from Poperinghe to Vlamertinge is in a defile, easily observed from the ridge.

=== Strategic developments ===
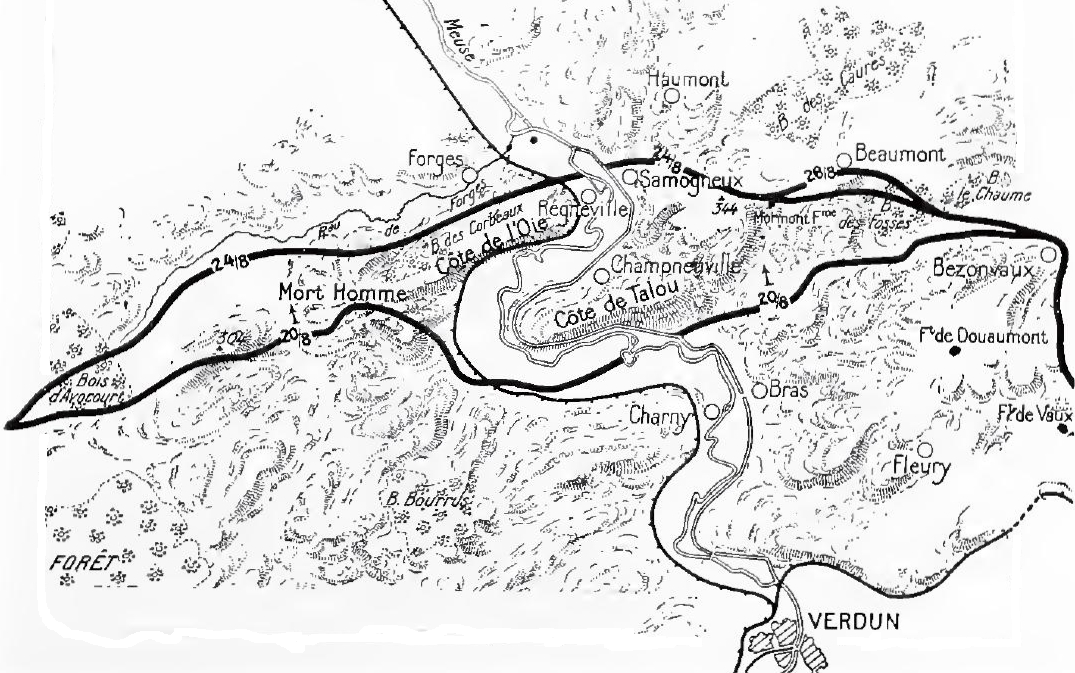
French attack at Verdun, 20–26 August 1917

Only two US divisions had arrived in France by late August but the mutinies in the French armies after the Nivelle Offensive had abated. The Second Battle of Verdun, in support of the offensive in Flanders, had been delayed from mid-July, which forfeited strategic surprise. German artillery frequently bombarded French positions with the new mustard gas and several spoiling attacks disrupted French preparations. On 20 August, the French attacked on an 11 mi (18 km) front and recaptured Mort Homme and Hill 304, taking 11,000 prisoners for the loss of 14,000 casualties, 4,470 of them killed or missing. The 5th Army was not able to deliver large counter-attacks, because its Eingreif divisions (Eingreifdivisionen) had been transferred to Flanders; local operations continued into November. On the Eastern Front, the Kerensky Offensive (1–19 July) had been defeated by the Central Powers; the Russian armies began to disintegrate and Germany and Austria-Hungary were able to reinforce other fronts. In the south, the Italian army began the Eleventh Battle of the Isonzo on 17 August and captured the Bainsizza Plateau, leading the Austro-Hungarians to appeal for German help; a French offensive in Greece on the Salonika front was repulsed.

=== Tactical developments ===
==== Battle of Messines ====
Field Marshal Sir Douglas Haig, commander of the British Expeditionary Force intended to exploit success in the Second Army (General Herbert Plumer) attack on the Messines–Wytschaete Ridge on 7 June, by gaining a foothold on the Gheluvelt Plateau as a preliminary to the main offensive out of the Ypres Salient. Plumer planned for II Corps (Lieutenant-General Claud Jacob) and VIII Corps (Lieutenant-General Aylmer Hunter-Weston) to attack either side of Bellewaarde Lake, to capture the higher ground for 1,200 yd (1,100 m) west of a line from Stirling Castle 2,000 yd (1,800 m) northwards to Westhoek (West Corner). Plumer wanted three days to transfer 60 heavy guns and howitzers northwards from Messines Ridge. On 6 June, the day before the Messines attack, the Fifth Army commander, General Hubert Gough, had told Haig that he preferred to wait until the Northern Operation, the main offensive out of the Ypres Salient or to have command of the II and VIII corps attack. On 8 June, both corps sent patrols forward which reported determined resistance, prompting Haig to ask Plumer to begin the attack at once. Plumer wanted to wait for the artillery to arrive and Haig transferred command of the II and VIII corps to the Fifth Army.

Haig ordered Gough to conduct a limited attack with the two corps but Gough reported that a success would put the British in a "very exposed and difficult salient" and that it would be better to conduct the attack with the main offensive. Feldmarschall (Field Marshal) Rupprecht, Crown Prince of Bavaria, the commander of Army Group Rupprecht of Bavaria (Heeresgruppe Kronprinz Rupprecht von Bayern) on the northern part of the Western Front, thought that the British success on 7 June foreshadowed an attack against the 4th Army to capture the higher ground between Gheluvelt and Zandvoorde in the north and Comines on the Lys (Leie) river, south of Messines Ridge. Rupprecht contemplated a retirement to a line from Werviq to Zandvoorde and Hooge as soon as the British attacked, then to retreat to the Flandernstellung, which had been built earlier in 1917. In late June, Rupprecht expected the British to conduct battering-ram attacks on narrow fronts, with overwhelming artillery-fire, to drive wedges into the defences of the 4th Army and deplete German reserves, preparatory to an advance out of the Ypres Salient on a broad front (auf breiter Basis angesetzten Durchbruchsangriff "breakthrough attack launched on a broad basis").

==== Peripheral operations ====
Between the end of the Battle of Messines and the Battle of Pilckem Ridge at Ypres beginning on 31 July, operations against Lens and Lille were to be made by the First Army in late June. Offensive operations were planned near Gavrelle and Oppy, along the Souchez River against a German salient between Avion and the west end of Lens, the capture of Reservoir Hill (Hill 65) south of Lens and an attack by the Canadian Corps on Hill 70, at the northern outskirts of Lens. The attacks were conducted earlier than intended, to use heavy and siege artillery before it was transferred to Ypres; the Souchez operation was cut back and the attack on Hill 70 postponed. the Battle of Hill 70, 30 mi (48 km) south of Ypres, took place from 15 to 25 August. Three of the Canadian divisions captured the hill, inflicted many casualties on five divisions of the German 6th Army and pinned down troops reserved for the relief of tired divisions on the Flanders front. Generalleutnant (Lieutenant-General) Hermann von Kuhl, the chief of staff of Heeresgruppe Kronprinz Rupprecht, wrote later that it was a costly defeat and wrecked the plan for relieving fought-out (exhausted) divisions from Flanders.

== Prelude ==
=== German preparations ===
==== Fortifications ====
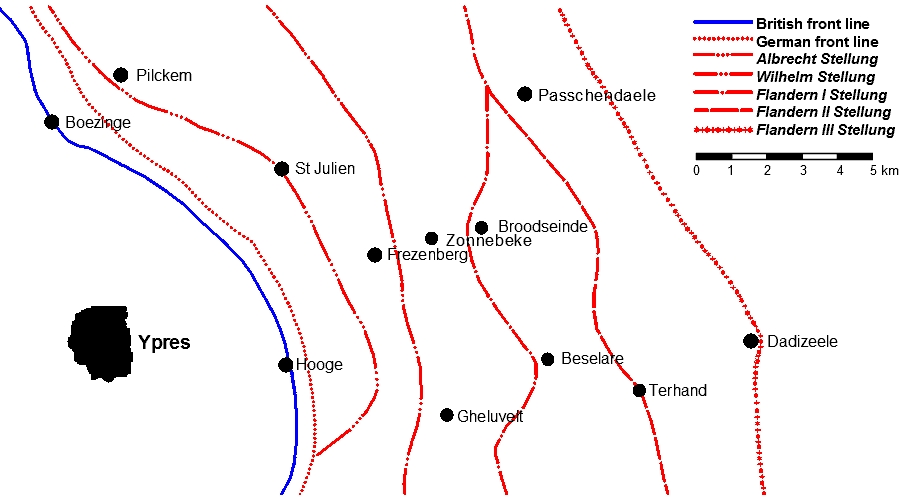
The British front line and the German defences in the area east of Ypres, mid-1917

The 4th Army (General Friedrich Sixt von Armin) was responsible for defence of the Western Front from Lille to the North Sea, which included the Ypres Salient. In early 1917, German corps had been renamed Gruppen based on a corps headquarters, with fresh divisions coming under command as tired ones were withdrawn, rather than the traditional permanent establishment of divisions. The IX Reserve Corps became Gruppe Wijtschate and held 6 mi (9.7 km) of the front south of the Menin road northwards, with three ground holding divisions (Stellungsdivisionen) in the front line and three Eingreif (specialist counter-attack) divisions in reserve. The III Bavarian Corps was renamed Gruppe Ypern and held 6 mi (9.7 km) of front from the Menin road north to the Gheluvelt Plateau and Pilckem, with three Stellungsdivisionen and two Eingreif divisions. The Eingreif divisions were kept out of sight behind the Menin and Passchendaele ridges. About 5 mi (8.0 km) further back were four more Eingreif divisions and 7 mi (11 km) beyond were another two divisions in army group reserve.

After the defeat of Gruppe Wijtachate at Messines in June, the Germans feared a British attack on the Bassevillebeek spur (Tower Hamlets to the British) beyond the north end of the ridge. Since early 1917, there had been three German defensive positions behind the front position. The Albrechtstellung ran from Bixschoote in the north, southwards behind Pilckem Ridge and across the Gheluvelt Plateau. The Wilhemstellung began at Langemarck, ran south to Gravenstafel then crossed the Gheluvelt Plateau to Zandvoorde to the east of Messines Ridge. The Flandernstellung (Flanders Position), built earlier in the year, ran along Passchendaele Ridge and across the Gheluvelt Plateau behind Polygon Wood, west of Becelaere, across the Menin road and south to the Lys river. Because of the flat ground and high water table, hundreds of pillboxes and blockhouses, rather than deep dugouts, had been built above ground and camouflaged with mud and turf. The many stone farmhouses dotted around had also been fortified; from two to forty men could be accommodated in the concrete and steel shelters, immune to anything smaller than a hit by an 8-inch shell.

On 9 June, Rupprecht proposed a withdrawal to the Flandernstellung east of Messines; construction of defences had begun but were terminated on 14 June, after Colonel Fritz von Loßberg, the Chief of Staff of the 6th Army, had been swapped with Oberstleutnant (Lieutenant-Colonel) Max Stapff, Chief of Staff of the 4th Army. Loßberg rejected a withdrawal and ordered that the front line be held rigidly. The Flandernstellung, along Passchendaele Ridge east of the Wilhemstellung, would become the Flandern I Stellung and a new Flandern II Stellung would branch off north of Passchendaele, run south through Terhand and west of Menin to the Lys. Construction of Flandern III Stellung from Moorslede to Westroosebeke, behind Passchendaele Ridge to Dadizeele and west of Menin on the Lys, was also begun. By July, the defences east of Ypres were the front position, the Albrechtstellung (second position), Wilhelmstellung (third position), Flandern I Stellung (fourth position), Flandern II Stellung (fifth position) and Flandern III Stellung (sixth position, under construction).

Debate among the German commanders continued and on 25 June, Erich Ludendorff suggested that Gruppe Ypern be withdrawn to the Wilhelmstellung, leaving only outposts in the Albrechtstellung. On 30 June, Kuhl suggested a withdrawal to Flandern I Stellung along Passchendaele Ridge, joining with the old front line near Langemarck to the north and Armentières in the south. A withdrawal would avoid a hasty retreat from Pilckem Ridge and force the British into a time-consuming redeployment. Loßberg disagreed, because the British would launch a broad front attack, making a local withdrawal pointless; the ground east of the Oosttaverne line was easy to defend, the Menin Road Ridge could be held and Pilckem Ridge deprived the British of ground observation over the Steenbeek valley, while German observation of the area from Passchendaele Ridge allowed infantry to be supported by observed artillery fire.

==== Infantry organisation ====
The 4th Army operation order for the defensive battle was issued on 27 June. The system of defence in depth began with a front system (first line) with breastworks Ia, Ib and Ic, about 200 yd (180 m) apart, garrisoned by the four companies of each front battalion, with listening-posts in no-man's-land. About 2,000 yd (1,800 m) behind these works was the forward battle zone (Kampffeld) in front of the Albrechtstellung (second position or artillery protective line [Artillerieschutzstellung]). The support battalions comprised a Sicherheitsbesatzung (security company) to hold strong-points and three Stoßtruppen (storm troops) to counter-attack from the back of the Kampffeld, half being based in the pillboxes of the Albrechtstellung to provide a framework for the re-establishment of defence in depth, once an attack had been repulsed. Dispersed in front of the line were divisional Scharfschützen (Sharpshooter) machine-gun nests, called the Stützpunktlinie (strongpoint line). The Albrechtstellung marked the front of the main battle zone (Grosskampffeld) which was about 2,000 yd (1.1 mi; 1.8 km) deep, containing most of the field artillery of the front divisions, behind which was the Wilhelmstellung (third position); in its pillboxes the reserve battalions of the front-line regiments were held back for counter-attacks.

From the Wilhelmstellung back to Flandern I Stellung was a rearward battle zone (rückwärtiges Kampffeld) containing support and reserve assembly areas for the Eingreif divisions. The failures at Verdun in December 1916 and at Arras in April 1917, had given more importance to these areas, since the Kampffeld had been overrun during both offensives and the garrisons lost. It was anticipated that the main defensive engagement would take place in the Grosskampffeld, with the reserve regiments of the Stellungsdivisionen (front divisions) and Eingreif divisions advancing against attackers who had been slowed and depleted by the forward garrisons,

... they will have done their duty so long as they compel the enemy to use up his supports, delay his entry into the position, and disorganise his waves of attack.

— Generalleutnant William Balck

The leading regiment of an Eingreif division was to advance into the zone of the Stellungsdivision, with its other two regiments moving forward in close support. Eingreif divisions were accommodated 10,000–12,000 yd (5.7–6.8 mi; 9.1–11.0 km) behind the front line and began their advance to assembly areas in the rückwärtiges Kampffeld, ready to intervene in the Grosskampffeld with an instant-immediate counter-thrust (den sofortigen Gegenstoß). Loßberg rejected elastic defence as a tactic in Flanders, because there was little prospect of operational pauses between British attacks given that the British had so much artillery and ammunition. A trench garrison which retired, quickly became disorganised and could not counter-attack, losing the sector and leaving the flanks of neighbouring formations in the air. Loßberg ordered that the front line was to be fought for at all costs, with immediate counter-attacks to recapture lost sectors.

Front line troops were not expected to cling to shelters but leave them as soon as the battle began, moving forward and to the flanks, to avoid artillery-fire and to counter-attack. German infantry equipment had recently been improved by the arrival of 36 MG 08/15 machine-guns (tactical equivalent of the British Lewis gun) per regiment. The Trupp of eight men was augmented by a MG 08/15 crew of four men, to become a Gruppe, the Trupp becoming a Stoßtrupp. The extra fire power provided German infantry with more means for fire and manoeuvre tactics; 60 per cent of the front line garrison were formed into Stoßtrupps and the other 40 per cent were concentrated in Stoßgruppen, in the forward battle zone. The Albrechtstellung contained 80 per cent of the Stoßkompanien and Stoßbatallione in divisional reserve and the Eingreif division (composed of Stoß formations), was based in the rear positions.

=== British preparations ===
By mid-1917, plans for infantry attacks were determined by the artillery support that could be provided. Commanders planned attacks to create the conditions for success in the absence of voice communication and attacks were limited to the range of artillery covering fire. Infantry units were to follow a creeping barrage, pausing at intermediate objectives to reorganise behind standing barrages and then dig in on the final objective, behind a protective barrage. In February 1917, infantry units were organised and equipped on a standard pattern and trained to achieve their objectives so that each man knew what to do and the drills to follow in certain circumstances. SS 143 (Instructions for the training of Platoons for Offensive Action) prescribed a platoon organisation of four sections, the Lewis gun and rifle-grenade sections for firepower and the rifle and bombing sections for manoeuvre. The platoon was to seek opportunities for flank attacks and to use initiative rather than refer back for orders. The new infantry platoon organisation and training gave infantry the capacity to succeed despite casualties to officers and NCOs and sometimes after losing the creeping barrage.

Divisions organised attacks according to SS 135 (Instructions for the training of Platoons for Offensive Action) of December 1916. The pamphlet was derived from the experience of the Somme in 1916 for divisions to organise according to a common pattern and prescribed the siege warfare methods necessary for trench-to-trench attacks, the semi-open fighting, when defensive positions had been captured and open warfare techniques, for when the defence collapsed. All the sections of SS 135 addressed the problem of command when no voice communication existed by prescribing that a commander's intention must be communicated and that the infantry should make every effort to send back information by any means available, primarily by visual methods which needed specialist parties to advance with the infantry to set up relay stations, carrier pigeons, experimental wireless sets, power buzzers, signal lamps and runners, who were trained to use the terrain and know the trench systems for maximum protection.

=== Davidson memorandum ===
In late June, Brigadier-General John Davidson, the head of the Operations Branch, BG(O), at GHQ, wrote a memorandum criticising some aspects of the Fifth Army plan for "ambiguity as to what was meant by a step-by-step attack with limited objectives". Davidson advocated advances of no more than 1,500–3,000 yd (0.85–1.70 mi; 1.4–2.7 km), to increase the concentration of British artillery and for operational pauses to repair roads and move artillery and ammunition forward. Destructive artillery fire on the smaller area of attack would be of correspondingly greater density and a closer objective would make a better jumping-off line for the next advance. The German tactic of immediate counter-attack (Gegenstoß) would be easier to defeat when the British infantry were organised and relatively fresh, the artillery was ready and communications established, rather than in an isolated position further forward. Davidson wrote that a series of such attacks would be needed, before the demoralisation of the defenders would make more ambitious tactics feasible. Gough replied to Davidson that the extent of the preparations for the attack justified a more optimistic plan,

It is important to recognise that the results to be looked for from a well-organised attack which has taken weeks and months to prepare are great, much ground can be gained and prisoners and guns captured during the first day or two.

The Fifth Army plan emphasised that information should quickly be communicated back to headquarters and that troops should be independent within the plan, to achieve a high tempo of operations (the rate or rhythm of activity relative to the enemy) rather than lose time waiting for orders. The II Corps frontage was widened to attack Tower Hamlets, a cluster of pillboxes at the top of the Bassevillebeek Spur opposite the right flank, which was an obvious base for a German counter-attack into the right flank of II Corps. The Fifth Army HQ arranged for II Corps to take over the 24th Division and artillery from the Second Army, extending the southern flank of the II Corps to the Klein Zillebeke–Zandvoorde road on 4 July. (Note: In 2024, Nicholas Ridley wrote that this change was ascribed to Haig in the official history, having visited Jacob to discuss plans on 27 July but that this must be a mistake, because Haig was in London on that date. The 24th Division was transferred with its divisional artillery, that the 23rd Division artillery plus 13 medium and 25 heavy artillery batteries.) After meeting with Gough and Plumer on 28 June, Haig endorsed the Fifth Army plan but emphasised that the main battle would be for the Gheluvelt Plateau and the plan should reflect this. An advance in the north should depend on the capture and consolidation of the plateau, after which an advance along the main ridge to Broodseinde could begin.

The Fifth Army Intelligence summary of 7 July described the elaborate defences on the Gheluvelt Plateau, noted that most new fortifications were being added to the plateau compared to the flanks and that much of the German artillery was placed to support the defenders on the plateau. The summary contained a prediction that the Germans would pivot on the Gheluvelt Plateau if they were pushed back over the Steenbeek further north. Summaries on 14, 17 and 21 July, reported that the German field artillery west of the Steenbeek had been withdrawn 3,000 yd (1.7 mi; 2.7 km) behind the front line and that the assembly areas for Eingreif divisions (Eingreifdivisionen) were behind the Gheluvelt Plateau and Passchendaele Ridge. In the Fifth Army operation order issued on 27 June, the green line (third objective) was made the main objective, where a protective barrage would fall for one hour after the infantry were scheduled to arrive. After the protective barrage finished, patrols of fresh troops were to move forward to reconnoitre and occupy tactically valuable ground not occupied by the Germans, up to the fourth objective (red line).

=== II Corps plan ===
The II Corps was to advance successively on a 6,200 yd (3.5 mi; 5.7 km) front to the blue, black and green objective lines, about 1,000, 2,000 and 2,500 yd (0.57, 1.14 and 1.42 mi; 0.91, 1.83 and 2.29 km) forward. The objectives were just beyond the German front system, the Albrechtstellung (second line) and the Wilhelmstellung (third line), at any of which a halt could be called. The green line was 1,000 yd (910 m) ahead on the right flank of the 24th Division at Klein Zillibeke in the south, to 2,500 yd (1.4 mi; 2.3 km) along the Ypres–Roulers railway, the left flank of the 8th Division (Major-General William Heneker) in the north. Local advances could be made towards the red line (fourth objective) 1,000–1,500 yd (0.57–0.85 mi; 0.91–1.37 km) further on, by patrols from the reserve brigades at the discretion of divisional commanders, depending on the state of the German defenders beyond the green line. The preliminary bombardment was intended to destroy German strong-points and trenches, cut barbed wire and counter-battery fire was to suppress German artillery during the attack. The infantry would advance behind a creeping barrage moving at 100 yd (91 m) every four minutes, followed by infantry in columns or artillery formation. The II Tank Brigade, Tank Corps was to attack the plateau with 16 tanks, followed by 24 to attack the third objective and eight more to advance on the fourth objective with four supply tanks following.

The wreckage of the woods on the plateau camouflaged many German strongpoints (including 23 pillboxes still undamaged between the front line and the Albrechtstellung on 31 July) and barbed-wire obstacles, which were hard to detect by air reconnaissance, which was also limited by poor weather during July. Much of the German field artillery on the plateau was hidden in the remains of the woods or behind the plateau, safe from ground observation. II Corps was to attack with three divisions, one with an attached brigade, supported by about 43 per cent of the Fifth Army artillery and the guns of X Corps, Second Army to the south. The Germans were expected to counter-attack quickly on the plateau, given the vital importance of its commanding ground to both sides. The 22 July operation order for the 8th Division specified that "if the opportunity arises", an attempt would be made to advance to the red line along the Broodseinde Ridge. The 25th Brigade, with the 12 tanks of C Company, A Tank Battalion, was to conduct the attack from the black to the green line and if successful, an infantry battalion, the surviving tanks and B Squadron of the 1/1st Yorkshire Dragoons were to advance on the red line. The rest of the division was in corps reserve, ready to advance beyond the red line if needed. Beyond the red line were the Flandern I, II and III Stellungen (positions), except for a mile of Flandern I Stellung south of Broodseinde.

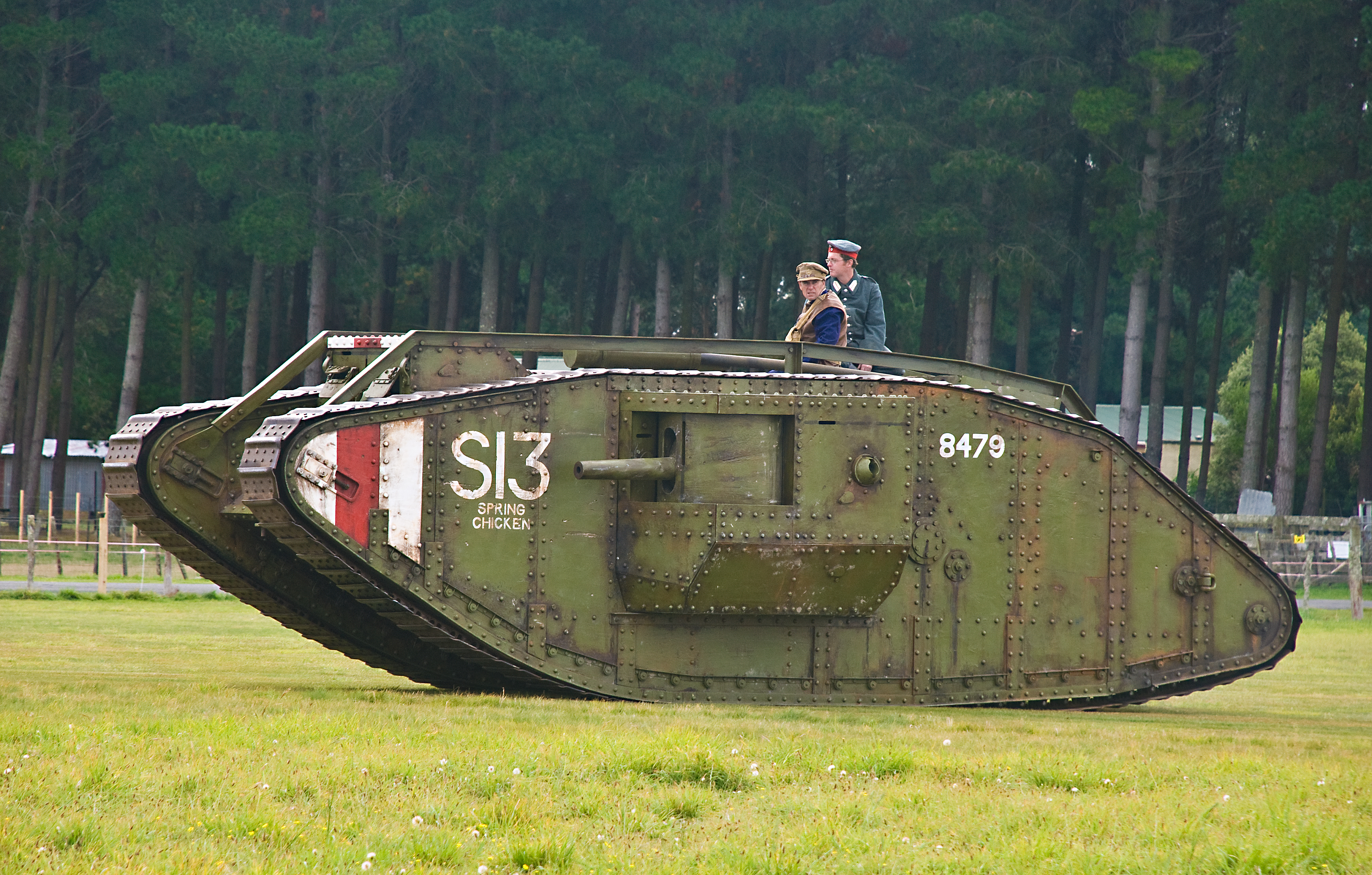
Mark IV tank on show at Masterton in New Zealand, April 2009

On 10 July, Heneker wrote that the 8th Division attack depended on the success of the 30th Division (Major-General Weir de Lancey Williams) on the right (south). If the 30th Division failed to reach its objectives, an advance by the 8th Division beyond the second objective would be vulnerable to enfilade fire from Stirling Castle north to Polygon Wood. The 30th Division had the most difficult task in II Corps, yet had not recovered from its losses earlier in the year. Too late, GHQ suggested using a fresher division but to reduce the burden, two battalions of the 89th Brigade and two of the 53rd Brigade of the 18th (Eastern) Division were added the 30th Division. The extra battalions were to advance from the second to the third objective, with the 54th Brigade ready to continue the advance if the third objective fell. On 29 July, Williams told the Fifth Army HQ that a creeping barrage at 25 yd (23 m) a minute was too fast for the tangles of undergrowth and wrecked woods of the ridges and Gheluvelt Plateau and next day, Williams suggested that the creeper should be slowed to 20 yd (18 m) per minute but was over-ruled because it was too late to change the barrage plan.

== Battle ==
=== 31 July ===
Weather 31 July – 15 August 1917
Date	Rain mm	°F	
31	21.7	69	dull
1	21.5	59	—
2	5.3	59	—
3	9.9	59	—
4	4.9	66	dull
5	0.0	73	fine
6	0.1	71	fine
7	0.0	69	dull
8	10.2	71	dull
9	0.2	68	fine
10	1.5	69	fine
11	4.4	69	dull
12	1.7	72	dull
13	0.0	67	dull
14	18.1	79	—
15	7.8	65	dull

The II Corps attack began at 3:50 a.m. to coincide with dawn but low cloud meant that it was still dark. II Corps faced Reserve Infantry Regiment 82 on the right flank of the 22nd Reserve Division from Klein Zillebeke to Lower Star Post in Shrewsbury Forest, the 6th Bavarian Reserve Division from Lower Star Post northwards to Westhoek and Infantry Regiment 95 of the 38th Division from Westhoek to the Ypres–Roulers railway. The 6th Bavarian Reserve Division had been in the front line since 15 July and had suffered many casualties during the British bombardment and began to be relieved by the 52nd Reserve Division on the night of 29/30 July. The outpost garrisons of Bavarian Reserve Infantry regiments 16, 17 and 18 either side of the Menin road at Hooge, had been reduced by half against the risk of mine explosions, after the disaster on 7 June during the Battle of Messines. Troops holding the front line were slowly to retire to the second line when attacked and Eingreifdivisionen were to close up to their assembly areas on receipt of simple code words like Scharnhorst and Wilhelm, ready to advance and conduct Gegenstöße (instant-immediate counter-attacks).

All three brigades of the 24th Division attacked to create a defensive flank along the south-west of the Gheluvelt Plateau, across the dip of the Bassevillebeek stream from south of the Klein Zillebeke–Zandvoorde road in the east to the Menin road on the west. On the right flank, the 17th Brigade achieved its objective 1,000 yd (910 m) east of Klein Zillebeke and gained touch with X Corps of the Second Army. The 73rd Brigade, in the centre, had to advance through Shrewsbury Forest but was stopped by fire from German pillboxes at Lower Star Post, on a slight rise in the middle of a clearing. The German garrison held out supported by covering fire from machine-gun posts further back; the 73rd Brigade advance was stopped and the 17th Brigade was forced to retire to a line about 300 yd (270 m) short of the second objective. The 72nd Brigade on the left flank reached the Bassevillebeek stream below the Bassevillebeek (Tower Hamlets) Spur but was fired on from Dumbarton Wood on the left flank and withdrew to a line south from Bodmin Copse, several hundred yards short of the first objective. (Torrential rain fell during the night and troops of the 73rd Brigade discovered that the Germans had retired from Lower Star Post and occupied the position early on 1 August.)

The 21st Brigade on the right could not emerge from assembly dugouts on time because of a German bombardment and reached the start line after the barrage had begun to creep forward. The infantry were overburdened and the two leading battalions failed to catch up through the wreckage of tree stumps shell craters and barbed wire in Sanctuary Wood. As the British reached the eastern edge of the wood they were engaged by German machine-gunners in pillboxes on Stirling Castle Ridge 500 yd (460 m) further on. a slow and costly advance began across the devastated ground and the support battalions, which should have advanced to the second objective, also became involved in the attack, which took until 6:00 a.m. to capture the ridge, 44 Germans being captured in the remains of the castle. By the time the ridge was captured, the creeping barrage was on the far side of the Bassevillebeek valley and all attempts to advance down the forward slope were costly failures in the face of German machine-gun fire from camouflaged emplacements on the far side. The brigade dug in roughly on the first objective from Bodmin Copse north to Stirling Castle.

On the left flank, the 90th Brigade made a slow advance in the dark, the left flank battalion veering northwards into Château Wood and reporting mistakenly that it had captured its objectives in Glencorse Wood. The rest of the brigade was unable to advance beyond the first objective, against German machine-gun fire from pillboxes around the Albrechtstellung at the narrowest part of the plateau between Inverness Copse and Glencorse Wood. At 5:00 a.m. the German artillery began to bombard Sanctuary and Château woods, which cut communications with the rear. Telephone lines were cut, wireless sets were damaged, power buzzers were useless in the wet ground and the bad light made visual signalling very difficult. A messenger pigeon released at 8:30 a.m. with a situation report and one at and 9:00 a.m. requesting that the barrage be brought back to the first objective, failed to return. At 9:50 a.m., an aircraft on contact patrol had reported that it received small-arms fire from Inverness Copse and that no British troops could be seen. Runners took hours to traverse the heavy going and it took until 10:00 a.m. for reports to arrive. The creeping barrage had begun to move from the second to the third objective at 10:10 a.m. and thirty minutes later, Williams reported to II Corps HQ that the infantry were held up on the first objective.

By 9:00 a.m.,Williams suspected that the advance had stalled and Lee managed to cancel the advance of the 54th Brigade from the third to the fourth objective but two 89th Brigade battalions and two 53rd Brigade battalions from the 18th (Eastern) Division, which should have made the advance from the second to the third objective, had already advanced. The four battalions were slowed by the barrage on Sanctuary Wood and reached the first objective at 8:00 a.m., having suffered casualties crossing the wood. The creeping barrage had already reached the third objective and attempts to press on without the barrage down the forward slope of the Bassevillebeek valley and the neck of the plateau further north, failed. The British infantry became so mixed up that troops from eight battalions ended up in dug outs on the Menin road at Clapham Junction. On the left flank, a costly advance for 300 yd (270 m) was achieved south of Westhoek and then prevented from continuing by machine-gun fire from Glencorse Wood.

The support battalion of Reserve Infantry Regiment 239 had sheltered in a tunnel west of Inverness Copse and then blew it when the British attack began. The reserve battalion moved forward from Becelaere to Inverness Copse at 9:00 a.m., to recapture the high ground at Stirling Castle but was prevented from advancing beyond the second line by British artillery and machine-gun fire. The Germans opposite the 30th Division on the Menin road and on the far side of the Bassevillebeek stream, conducted Gegenstŏße (instant counter-attacks) which failed but the three Eingreifdivisionen of Gruppe Wijtschate were not called on, since the British were well short of the second objective. Communication between Stellungsdivisionen and Eingreifdivisionen was just as prone to failure as that of the British, which made counter-attacks extremely difficult to co-ordinate. Williams ordered an attack at 6:30 p.m. but an hour earlier, II Corps had ordered that the ground gained should be consolidated and the attack was cancelled.

In the 8th Division advance towards Westhoek, Bellewaarde Lake was taken by a converging attack along the spurs either side, while the banks were bombarded by mortars firing thermite bombs. As the troops advanced further, through the obstacles of Château Wood, they struggled to keep up with the creeping barrage to the first objective, the east side of Bellewaarde Ridge. The objective was captured in time for the support battalions to follow the barrage to the second objective and they arrived at 6:00 a.m. The second objective was on a forward slope and the troops there were soon engaged by German machine-gunners 500–800 yd (460–730 m) away on the far side of the Hanebeek valley and from Glencorse Wood on the right flank. The new front line could not be held south of Westhoek and the 24th Brigade and the right flank of the 23rd Brigade fell back about 500 yd (460 m) behind Westhoek Ridge. The 25th Brigade moved forward to Westhoek Ridge ready for the advance to the third objective at 10:10 a.m. but after moving forward several hundred yards the troops were caught in cross-fire from the machine-guns across the Hanebeek and from Glencorse Wood and fell back to the start line, the infantry on the right flank gaining touch with the 30th Division 500 yd (460 m) south of Westhoek. The line of shell-holes was held with great difficulty against massed small-arms fire. (Note: After the battle, Heneker criticised the placement of objectives on forward slopes and recommended that lines to be consolidated for defence should be on reverse slopes. (It was common in the British and German armies to have an observation line close to a ridge or slightly down the forward slope and the main line on the reverse slope.)) By 1:30 p.m., the attack by II Corps had been stopped and Jacob reported this to the Fifth Army HQ. Determined German counter-attacks by a battalion of Reserve Infantry Regiment 41 and by Infantry Regiment 95 to recapture Westhoek Ridge, were made at 2:00 and 7:00 p.m. The Germans gained a footing before the 25th Brigade recaptured the ground and was then withdrawn behind Bellewaarde Ridge in immediate reserve, with the 23rd and 24th brigades holding the new line. The infantry of the German 38th Division had conducted well-timed counter-attacks, in accord with the latest thinking about tactical manoeuvre.

==== Air operations ====
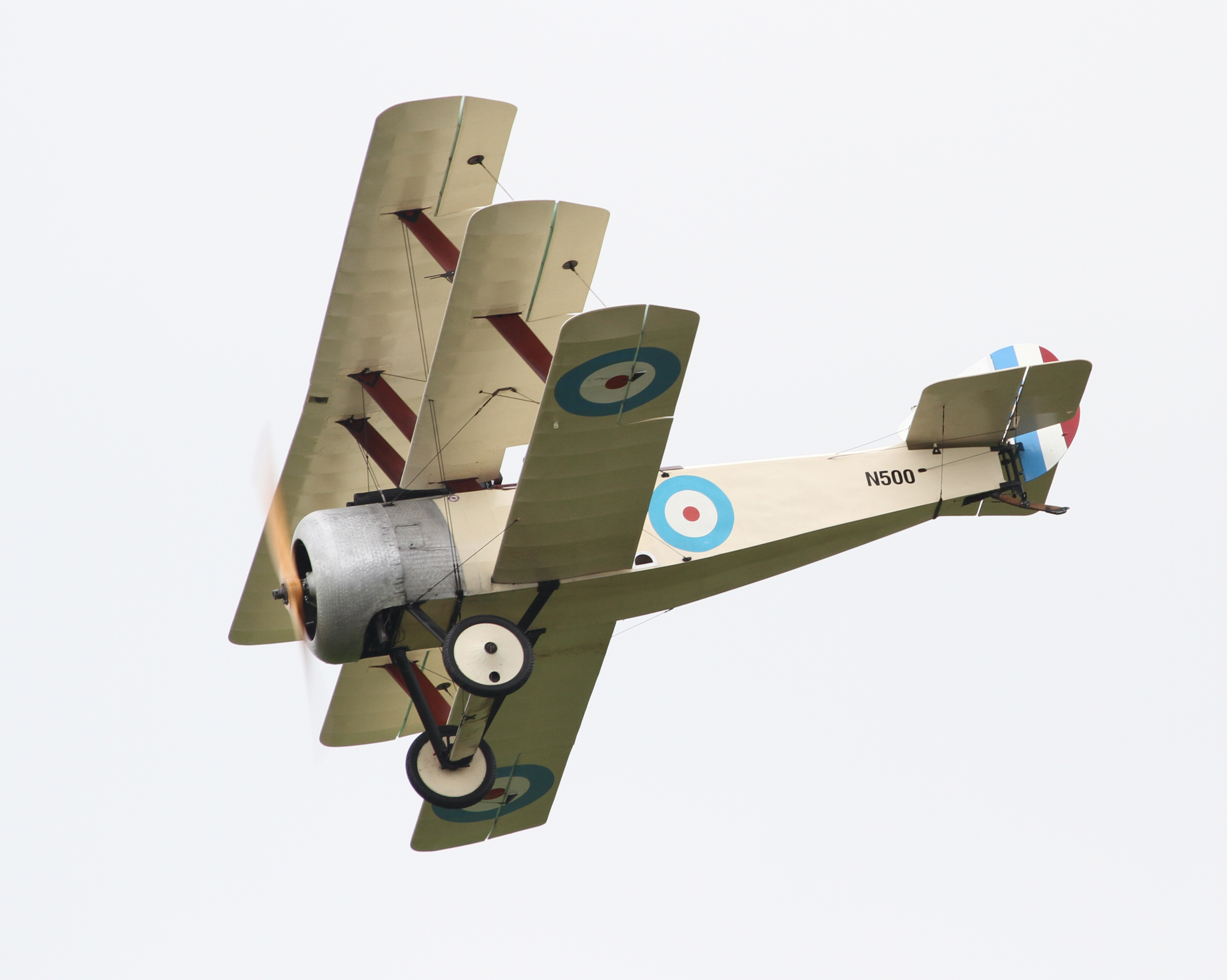
Example of a Sopwith Triplane, of the type seen by the 8th Company, Reserve Infantry Regiment 46 on 31 July 1917 (27389566584)

Operations by the Royal Flying Corps (RFC) to deprive the Germans of air observation over the attack front had been curtailed because of the poor weather on 29 and 30 July. On 31 July, dull weather and cloud at 500–800 ft (150–240 m) stopped the air operation planned in support of the ground offensive. The RFC managed 58 contact-patrol sorties by aircraft from corps squadrons, giving some information about the progress of the ground battle and observers reported that the infantry had failed to light flares when called on. Pilots flew lower to see the uniforms of the troops and 30 of the aircraft returned with damage from by bullets and shells. After taking such risks, some of the reconnaissance reports dropped at special reporting centres did not arrive at corps HQs but other reports were acted on, promptly to alter the bombardment.

Small numbers of aircraft from army squadrons were sent out to seek targets of opportunity and had some local effect. (Note: On 30 January 1916, an RFC brigade was attached to each British army, divided into wings, a corps wing, with squadrons responsible for close reconnaissance, photography and artillery observation on the front of each army corps and an army wing, which conducted longer-range reconnaissance and bombing.) Troops marching along roads, in villages and woods, supply columns, staff cars, machine-gun nests, artillery batteries and aircraft caught in the open on airfields were strafed from very low altitude. The Luftstreitkräfte made a maximum effort despite the weather and its airmen were able to report the position of the front line, also descending to identify soldiers' uniforms. Aircraft attacked British troops on the battlefield and reconnaissance aircrews saw that British reserves were not moving forward but poor light made photographic reconnaissance impossible. Despite visibility being fewer than 1.9 mi (3 km), German balloons were sent up until rained off in the afternoon.

==== Tank operations ====
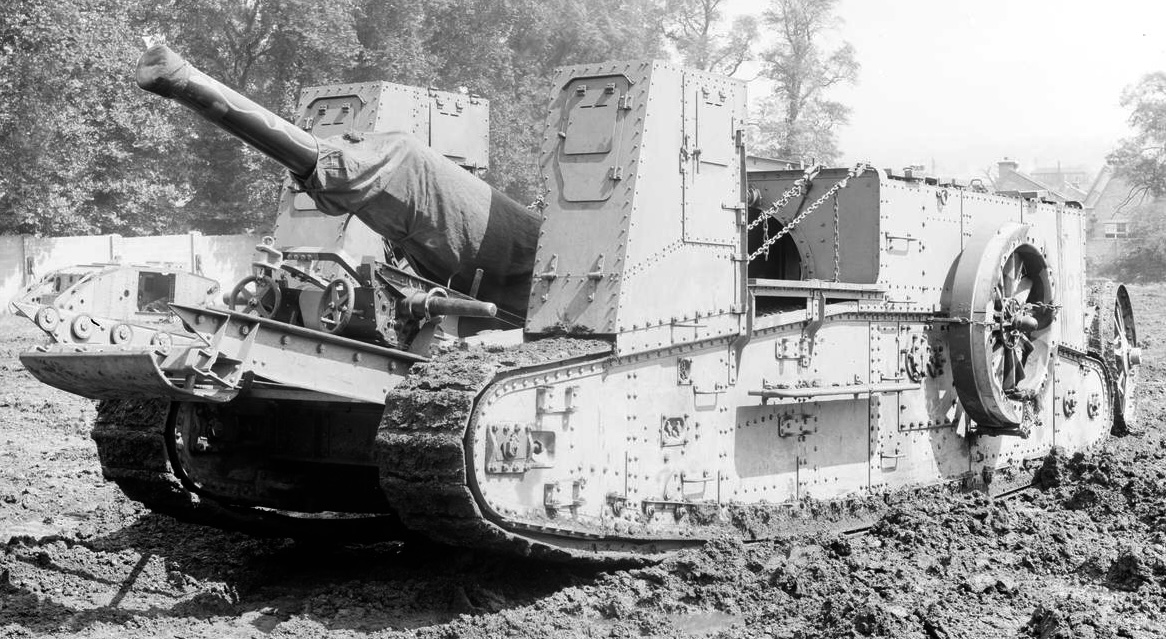
Gun Carrier Mk I, the first self-propelled gun

The advance of the tanks was hampered by the decision not to conduct a preliminary attack to capture the ground east of Sanctuary Wood and the woods nearby, for tank assembly areas. The 30th Division failed to capture a huge blockhouse to the north-east of Clapham Junction, from which the Germans commanded the Menin road to Hooge. Several attempts to destroy it with heavy artillery had failed and as tanks drove down the Menin road, 17 were hit by an anti-tank gun in the blockhouse. The first wave of 16 tanks were late and were reduced to 12 while trying to drive between the woods, four being hit near Hooge by anti-tank guns. The third objective was to be captured with the help of 24 tanks in the second wave but only 14 got forward.

Some tanks drove along the edges of Dumbarton Wood, Inverness Copse and Glencorse Wood, destroyed machine-gun nests and dispersed German troops assembling to counter-attack. The tank crews could not hit camouflaged, low, concrete emplacements built with ground-level loopholes, through which the German machine-gunners fired and forced the British infantry to ground. Eight tanks to attack the fourth objective were in the third echelon but only one tank got into action, joining in the fighting between the first and second objectives. Of the 48 fighting tanks attached to II Corps, 22 ditched or broke down and 19 got into action and caused the Germans many casualties but all were knocked out that day. (Gun Carrier Mark Is, the first self-propelled artillery could carry a 60-pounder gun or a 6-inch howitzer and made their début on 31 July.)

=== 1–9 August ===
After II Corps reported that it was close to the second objective, Gough ordered another attack on 2 August and then altered the order, to make certain that the second objective had been captured before the Fifth Army attacked again. On 1 August, Davidson recommended that the attack by II Corps should not be rushed but start after two to three days of clear weather, to exploit the observation points and the two maps captured on 31 July. The maps showed the positions of camouflaged pillboxes and Davidson argued that fresh divisions should be used because it was vital for II Corps to secure the Gheluvelt Plateau. The Fifth Army corps commanders agreed that taking the area from Inverness Copse to Westhoek would not be enough because the priority given to the defence of the plateau by the German 4th Army, meant that a big counter-attack to restore the front line must be expected. On the evening of 31 July, Rupprecht had made a diary entry,

...the results of the day's fighting were all the more satisfactory because the counter-attack divisions of Group Wytschaete behind Gheluvelt Plateau had scarcely been used.

Gruppe Wijtschate (sic) announced that

...the enemy cannot continue his intended breakthrough...until he has gained freedom for his right flank by pressing back the 52nd Reserve Division on Gheluvelt Plateau....The next blow may therefore be expected to be delivered with the utmost strength against the 52nd Reserve and 12th Divisions.(Gruppe Wijtschate order, 5 August)

The German commanders were anxious about the effect on German infantry of the fighting in Flanders but troops transferred to the 4th Army had been trained in the new defensive tactics developed in 1916 and revised after the Battle of Arras. Divisions arriving in Flanders were confident that their training, equipment and tactics could defeat the Allies.

The rain that began on 31 July continued for three days and turned the ground into a morass about 4,000 yd (2.3 mi; 3.7 km) wide behind the new British front line. The banks of streams had been smashed by artillery-fire and became bogs with few places to cross, all of whom were easily visible to the Germans and frequently bombarded, especially on the Gheluvelt Plateau. The consolidation of captured ground was retarded and troops who deviated from the tracks could drown. Roads were covered in mud, full of shell craters 3–4 ft (0.91–1.22 m) deep and the conditions exhausted rapidly the infantry of both sides.

On 2 August, Gough agreed that tanks would not be used again until a dry spell and on 2 August, the resumption of the offensive was postponed. On 4 August it stopped raining and 5 August was dull, stormy and sunless, with no drying wind and yet more rain forecast. On 3 August, Rupprecht wrote in his diary that German troops were quickly being exhausted by the conditions and divisions had suffered about 1,500–2,000 casualties during a period in the line, unlike on the Somme in 1916, when 14-day tours had cost divisions an average wastage of 4,000 men. Shorter periods in the front line enabled troops to recover faster but the frequent British gas bombardments made it difficult to get supplies forward; carrying parties of the 6th Bavarian Reserve Division had suffered 1,200 gas casualties. The Fifth Army HQ set 9 August for the II Corps attack and 13 August for the main offensive; the weather remained dull and misty until the evening of 8 August, when thunder and heavy rain again reduced the battlefront to a swamp; the attack was put back to 4:35 a.m. on 10 August.

=== Capture of Westhoek ===
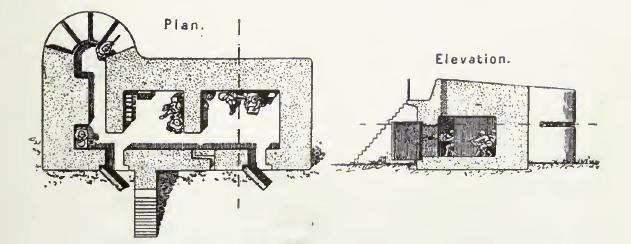
German pillbox, Flanders 1917

The power of the German artillery behind the Gheluvelt Plateau after 31 July was undiminished and a continuous bombardment fell on the front line and rear areas of II Corps. The counter-battery artillery of the Fifth Army fired on German artillery positions along the width of the army front, ready for the general attack due after the II Corps operation on the Gheluvelt Plateau. The British guns often bombarded the wrong artillery positions because of a lack of air reconnaissance to track the moves of German artillery from one artillery position to another in the bad weather. The British failed to achieve artillery superiority over the German artillery behind the plateau, which made the completion of new battery positions a long and costly effort that took until 8 August. Casualties in men and guns were so high that on 4 August, many British batteries were reduced to half strength. The state of the ground was so bad that gunners had to live in shell holes. New plank roads to carry ammunition forward could easily be seen by German artillery observers and wagon drivers and carrying parties moved only at night, dodging German bombardments which frequently included mustard gas. Amidst the rain and mud, the delivery of supplies and the passage of troops across the beaten zone extremely dangerous and caused a constant drain of casualties.

The 8th Division was replaced by the 7th and 75th brigades of the 25th Division from 1 to 4 August, which were then relieved by the 74th Brigade, troops in the front line being replaced every 48 hours. The 30th Division was relieved by the 55th and 54th brigades of the 18th (Eastern) Division on 4 August. The 24th Division, not due to attack, remained in the line and took over the front northwards close to Stirling Castle to narrow the attack frontage of the 18th (Eastern) Division. The fresh divisions had to remain close to the front for more than a week before zero hour and were rapidly exhausted by the conditions. The infantry were to advance behind a creeping barrage at 4:35 a.m., straight through to the second objective (black line) of 31 July, to capture the Albrechtstellung, Inverness Copse and Glencorse Wood across the neck of the plateau. The speed of the barrage gave the 18th (Eastern) Division 46 minutes and the 25th Division 25 minutes to complete the attack. On 8 August, Inverness Copse and Glencorse Wood were bombarded with 3,000 medium and heavy shells each; the bombardment was repeated on 9 August, the first bright day since July. The 18th (Eastern) Division attack by the 55th Brigade was to be on a battalion front of about 400 yd (370 m) and the 54th Brigade was to attack with two battalions on a front 800 yd (730 m) wide. The 74th Brigade of the 25th Division was to attack on the left flank on a 400 yd (370 m) front to recapture the Albrechtstellung, Westhoek village and Westhoek Ridge.

==== 10 August ====
Many of the German pillboxes were still undamaged, especially those at the south-west and north-west angles of Inverness Copse but the Kampffeld, about 800 yd (730 m) deep, was easily overrun by the British troops following the creeping barrage, which began at 4:35 a.m. The ground was full of flooded shell holes and in Glencorse Wood smashed trees rested on oozing mud. The defenders of Reserve Infantry Regiment 239 were capable of little resistance and many surrendered. The attacking battalion of the 55th Brigade that had advanced to the east side of Inverness Copse was vulnerable to attack from the south, because the right hand company, which had to form a defensive flank along the southern edge, had been stopped on its jumping-off line by machine-gun fire from a strongpoint at the south-west corner of the Copse. In the moonlight at 1:30 a.m., German sentries had seen the company and its support company crossing Stirling Castle Ridge to the start line. Both companies had been severely depleted by artillery and machine-gun fire before the attack. Just after 6:00 a.m., German field guns and machine-guns began to barrage the British start line from Stirling Castle north to Westhoek and cut off the British infantry from supplies and reinforcements. The German support battalions began immediate counter-attacks (Gegenstöße) into the Copse and the British were forced back through the north end. The Germans retook the western edge and the blockhouse at the north-western corner; British attempts to recapture the Copse failed.

The two battalions on the 54th Brigade front captured their objectives with fewer losses and occupied the Albrechtstellung pillboxes either side of FitzClarence Farm and along the track through Glencorse Wood, from which they repulsed the German Gegenstöße. The troops remained isolated by the German box barrage and needed reinforcements as their casualties increased during the day. The other two battalions of the brigade had held the front line for the last ten days and were exhausted but when the brigade commander asked for the 53rd Brigade to move closer at 7:40 a.m., Lee refused, to avoid crowding the area under bombardment, keeping the brigade available to take over the front line for the night. The brigade moved forward at 3:20 p.m. and the first two battalions only closed up to Sanctuary Wood around 7:00 p.m. German infantry moved into Polygon Wood and Nonne Bosschen and around 7:00 p.m. a hurricane bombardment fell on Glencorse Wood. Reserve Infantry Regiment 238 and Reserve Infantry Regiment 6, the Stoß regiment of the Eingreif 9th Reserve Division from Reutel, advanced behind a smokescreen into the wood and made a flanking attack from Inverness Copse. The British were forced back to their start line on the right but managed to hold the north-west corner of the wood.

The four battalions of the 74th Brigade, 25th Division, advanced on a 2,000 yd (1.1 mi; 1.8 km) front at 4:35 a.m. and were quick enough to evade the German counter-barrage. The outposts of Reserve Infantry Regiment 90, 54th Division, in the front line since 3/4 August, were captured by 5:30 a.m. but on the right flank a blockhouse garrison held out until attacked under a bombardment by Stokes mortars. The garrison in Westhoek and two blockhouses in the village were taken by surprise; a mud slough up to 30 yd (27 m) wide under 1 ft (0.30 m) of water in the Hanebeek Valley, protected the occupiers from counter-attacks. German artillery-fire continued all day; sniping and attacks by German aircraft on troops in the open caused many more losses. Contact with the rear was maintained all day using signal lamps; the five field artillery brigades responded quickly to calls for covering fire and dispersed German troops assembling for counter-attacks. As German troops reoccupied Glencorse Wood, snipers and machine-gunners were able to obstruct consolidation, particularly on the right flank; it was impossible to dig a continuous front line trench or communication trenches to the rear.

The 7th Brigade was in reserve and sent a battalion to reinforce the right flank and one forward to Westhoek Ridge in close reserve. The Germans attempted to make several counter-attacks into the night but all bar one were dispersed by artillery-fire. When a SOS rocket went unseen in the smoke at 7:15 p.m., another counter-attack was defeated by infantry small-arms fire, rifle-fire being found to be particularly effective. The 75th Brigade took over on the night of 11/12 August and by 14 August the 56th (1/1st London) Division (Major-General F. A. Dudgeon) and the 8th Division relieved the 25th Division. Casualties were 158 men killed, 1,033 wounded and more than 100 men missing; the right-hand battalion had 414 losses. At 11:55 a.m., Jacob ordered the front line to be consolidated and for the 53rd Brigade, in the 18th (Eastern) Division area, to recapture Glencorse Wood as soon as possible. The attack was postponed for 24 hours because of the weather, the condition of the ground and one of the relieving battalions going north of the Menin road instead of east. The artillery opened fire but the infantry advance was cancelled in time; the postponed attack was later called off.

=== 11–15 August ===
The front battalion commander of Reserve Infantry Regiment 239 had been captured on 10 August and said that the men had been so demoralised by their casualties from 31 July to 9 August, that he had reported that they could not hold their ground. The commanders of the 54th and 55th brigades in the attack of the 18th (Eastern) Division wrote that the artillery arrangements against a counter-attack had been inadequate and that one RFC aircraft for counter-attack reconnaissance was insufficient. On 12 August, Heneker asked that Nonne Bosschen and Glencorse Wood be captured as a preliminary, to avoid casualties like those of 31 July and that the artillery for 56th (1/1st London) Division should be reinforced. The sloping ground from the Menin road down to the Hanebeek Valley meant that if the attack on the southern flank failed, the 8th Division would again suffer enfilade-fire from the higher ground on the right flank. The suggestion was rejected but the day before the attack, the 53rd Brigade from the 18th (Eastern) Division was attached to the 56th (1/1st London) Division as a reinforcement.

On 12 August, Jacob asked for a delay in the general offensive due on 14 August, to allow time to capture the Gheluvelt Plateau at least as far as the 10 August objectives. The British had still not gained artillery superiority over the German guns beyond the plateau, which were destroying the tracks through Sanctuary and Château woods, interrupting the delivery of supplies and ammunition needed for the next attack. The eight divisions in corps reserve had been committed and the two in Fifth Army reserve had also been used, the 56th (1/1st London) Division joining II Corps on 6 August, along with the 47th (1/2nd London) Division and the 14th (Light) Division from the Second Army, by 15 August. Gough was constrained by Operation Hush needing the high tides due at the end of the month; if they were missed it would be four weeks before the next high tides. The Fifth Army offensive was postponed for a day but after a thunderstorm and downpour late on 14 August, Gough ordered another postponement until 16 August.

=== Battle of Langemarck ===
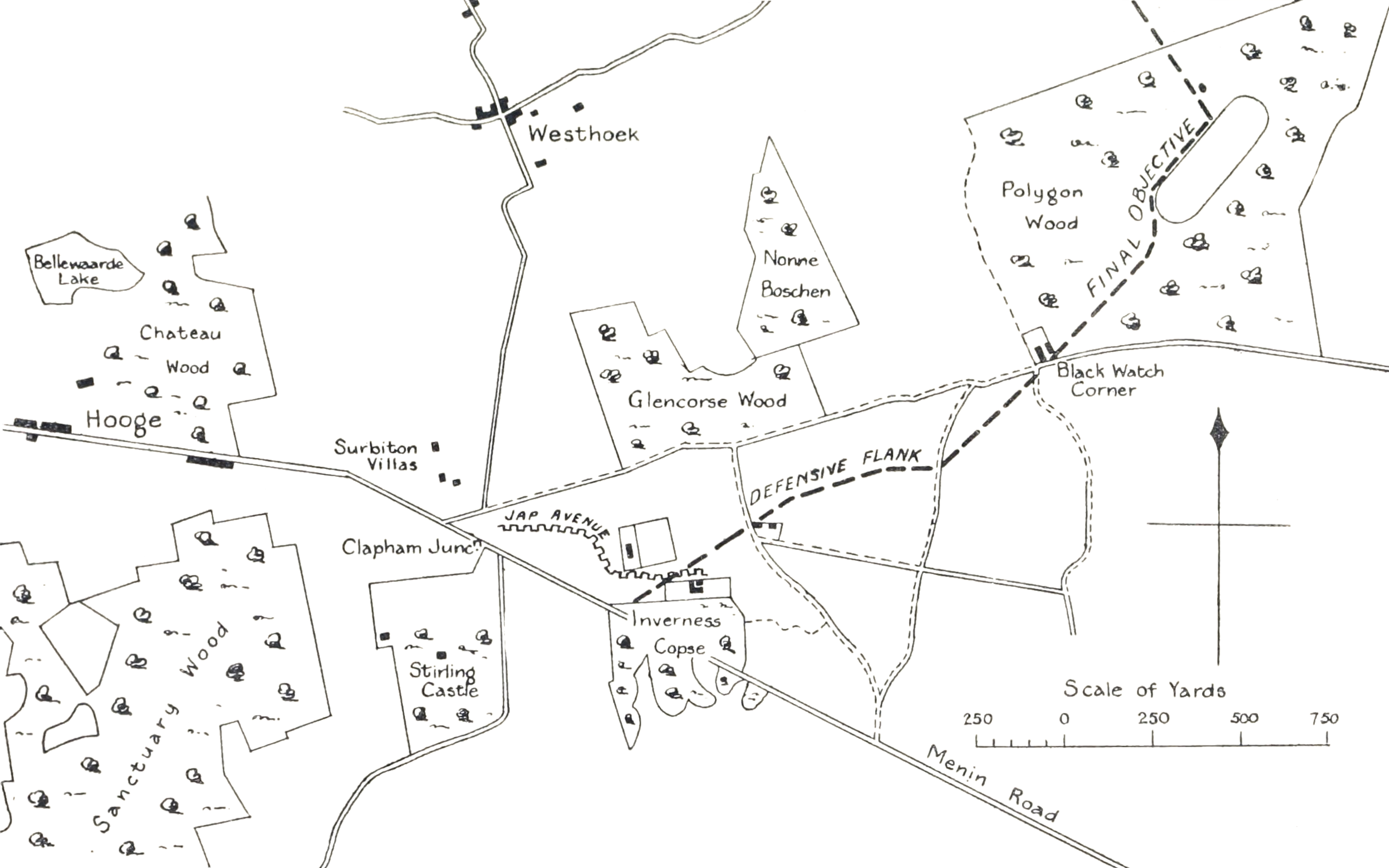
Map of the 56th (1/1st London) Division objectives, 16 August 1917

II Corps planned for the 56th (1/1st London) Division and the 8th Division to capture the Wilhelmstellung from Polygon Wood to the Ypres–Roulers railway, an advance of about 1,500 yd (1,400 m). The divisions were to set up a defensive flank facing south towards Inverness Copse, with eight strong points from Black Watch Corner at the south-west corner of Polygon Wood back to Stirling Castle. On 12 and 14 August, Brigadier-General Higginson reported that the casualties of the 53rd Brigade from 10 to 12 August had been so severe, that the brigade was incapable of reaching its objective. On 15 August, a tired battalion from the 54th Brigade and a fresh one from the 168th Brigade, 56th (1/1st London) Division reserve, were attached to form the defensive flank. The depth of advance was twice that of 10 August but battalion frontages were reduced from 400–250 yd (370–230 m) to compensate.

An intermediate objective was selected for a pause of 20 minutes for the supporting battalions to leapfrog the leading battalions and take the final objective. A creeping barrage by a hundred and eighty 18-pounder field guns was to move slower, at 100 yd (91 m) in five minutes, as seventy-two 4.5-inch howitzers and thirty-six 18-pounders kept standing barrages further on. The eight machine-gun companies of the 56th (1/1st London) Division and the 8th Division formed two groups, to fire overhead barrages on the objective and from south-west of Zonnebeke to the north-east corner of Polygon Wood. The 52nd Reserve Division, opposite the 56th (1/1st London) Division, was relieved by the 34th Division on the night of 11/12 August; a battalion of Infantry Regiment 145 took over in Glencorse Wood and Nonne Bosschen on the right and a battalion of Infantry Regiment 67 relieved the defenders of Inverness Copse and Herenthage Park, either side of the Menin road. The night of 15/16 August was very dark and a mist limited visibility to 300 yd (270 m).

==== 16 August ====
Weather 16–31 August 1917
Date	Rain mm	°F	
16	0.0	68	dull
17	0.0	72	fine
18	0.0	74	fine
19	0.0	69	dull
20	0.0	71	dull
21	0.0	72	fine
22	0.0	78	dull
23	1.4	74	dull
24	0.1	68	dull
25	0.0	67	dull
26	19.6	70	dull
27	15.3	57	dull
28	0.9	62	dull
29	2.6	61	dull
30	0.7	63	dull
31	0.7	64	dull

The British barrage began at 4:45 a.m., and the infantry followed its creep forward. German SOS flares rose into the sky but the artillery reply was too late and missed most of the attacking waves, except in the 56th Division area on the right, which lost many men in the leading companies to German artillery firing from the south-east; the advance of the two 53rd Brigade battalions to form the southern defensive flank was delayed. The rest of the composite brigade pressed on but was stopped by massed machine-gun fire from inside Inverness Copse, particularly from three machine-guns in the pillbox at the north-west corner, which had a wide field of fire. Machine-gun fire was also received from FitzClarence Farm in the open between the Copse and Glencorse Wood; a second attempt by the support companies failed. A shoot by heavy artillery on the pillbox from 5:00 to 7:00 p.m. the night before, had mistakenly not been fired and the preliminary bombardment by 4.5-inch howitzers had no effect. Part of the brigade managed to work forward further north and formed the defensive flank along the southern edge of Glencorse Wood.

In the centre, the 169th Brigade advanced quickly at the start but veered to the right to avoid boggy ground, then entered Glencorse Wood. The defenders were overrun after a mutually costly engagement and the intermediate objective, a line of pillboxes in the sunken road inside the wood, was captured. After a pause, the support battalions leapfrogged the intermediate line and pressed on through more boggy ground, against greater opposition and delays caused by German machine-gunners firing from old artillery positions. The troops lost the barrage but a few parties reached the final objective in the Wilhelmstellung pillboxes in Polygon Wood and northwards, along Anzac Farm spur to the vicinity of Iron Cross Redoubt.

The 167th Brigade also had a fast start but when it reached the north end of Nonne Bosschen, found mud 4 ft (1.2 m) deep. The brigade went round to the left, which caused a gap between the 167th and 169th brigades. The quick start had been partly due to the rear waves pushing up to avoid German shelling on the left of the brigade. The supporting infantry got mixed up with the foremost troops and failed to mop up captured ground or German troops who had been overrun and begun sniping from behind. Part of a company reached the area north of Polygon Wood, at about the same time as small numbers of troops from the 8th Division, attacking to the north. The ground in the 56th (1/1st London) Division area was so bad that none of the tanks in support got into action. A protective barrage fired in front of the intermediate objective failed to prevent Infantry Regiment 145 penetrating gaps and surrounding the four battalions of the 167th Brigade by 6:00 a.m. A German creeping barrage followed by infantry rolled over the surrounded battalions, whose survivors collected behind the sunken track in Glencorse Wood and the west side of Nonne Bosschen. Machine-gunners of the 9th London Battalion managed to stop the German advance and when news of the German attack reached the 167th Brigade HQ, the plan to form the southern defensive flank was cancelled.

On the 8th Division front, the two attacking brigades started well, advancing behind an "admirable" barrage and reached the Hanebeek stream, where hand bridges were used to cross for the advance to continue up Anzac Spur to the green line objectives on the ridge beyond. Difficulties began on the left flank, where the advance of the 16th (Irish) Division was stopped near Potsdam Redoubt, which freed German machine-gunners north of the railway to enfilade the area of 8th Division to the south. On the right flank, the 56th (1/1st London) Division advance was stopped by fire from German strong points and pillboxes and from German artillery concentrated to the south-east. The 8th Division eventually captured Iron Cross, Anzac and Zonnebeke redoubts on the rise beyond the Hanebeek, then sent parties over the ridge. German troops who recaptured machine-gun posts at the north end of Nonne Bosschen fired on the 25th Brigade troops digging in on Anzac Farm Spur, as Heneker had predicted.

German troops, seen arriving in lorries behind the German front line, advanced over Anzac Spur at 9:30 a.m. Smoke-shells in the German barrage obscured British SOS rockets and despite the good visibility, only a vague warning was delivered by an RFC aircraft on counter-attack reconnaissance. Other German guns placed a barrage from Stirling Castle to Westhoek for the rest of the day, which intensified at noon and prevented British carrying parties from taking food and ammunition forward. The British artillery did not open fire until 10:15 a.m. by when the 25th Brigade, already enfiladed from the right, had been frontally attacked and forced back to the Hanebeek, with many casualties. As the 25th Brigade fell back, the right of the 23rd Brigade was exposed and enveloped by the Germans, forcing the brigade retreated to avoid being rolled up. The British troops became disorganised but managed to hold the ground west of the Hanebeek, a few hundred yards forward of the start-line, with the northernmost battalion further forward, where the Hanebeek flowed beneath the Ypres–Roulers railway.

Reserve Infantry Regiment 90 had been resting around Becelaere and was sent back to Glencorse Wood and Nonne Bosschen to reinforce Infantry Regiment 145. At 4:00 p.m. the Germans counter-attacked from Polygon Wood and forced the remnants of the 169th Brigade out of the sunken track and back to the start-line at the west end of the wood. The 167th Brigade fell back as its southern flank was exposed and about 1,000 German infantry tried to exploit their success but British SOS flares were seen by the artillery which smothered the attack, inflicting many losses. By evening, German enfilade-fire led to the 8th Division brigades being ordered to retire close to their start-line. In a diary entry, Rupprecht wrote that 87,528 casualties had been suffered by Army Group Prince Rupprecht from 1 June to 10 August and that it was impossible for the 4th Army to conduct more than small attacks to improve their positions; Langemarck could not be recaptured.

=== 17–19 August ===
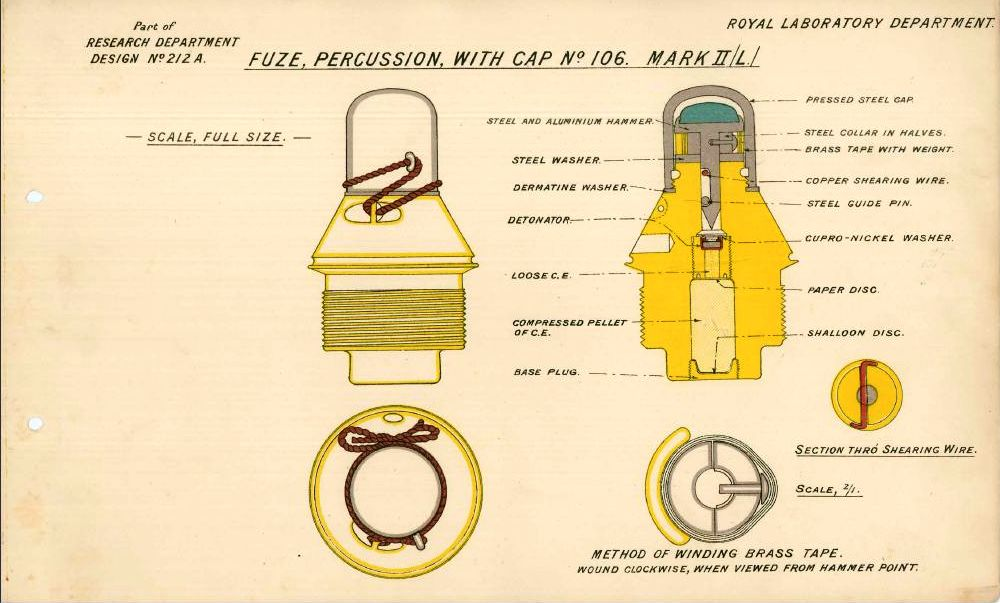
No 106 Mk II Fuze

On 17 March, Gough told a conference that an attack to capture the objectives not attained on 16 August, would take place on 25 August and that II Corps was to capture Inverness Copse on 22 August as a preliminary; the weather on 17 and 18 August was good with a drying wind. Reports from the brigade commanders of the 56th (1/1st London) Division criticised a lack of time to prepare for the attack and suggested that fresh troops ought to keep close to the foremost troops to consolidate objectives as soon as they were captured. The protective barrage fired in front of the objective had been unsatisfactory because many of the shells were fitted with Fuze 106 were ineffective when falling on soft ground and waterlogged shell-holes.

During the Battle of Langemarck, Infantry Regiment 145 had penetrated the protective barrage and surrounded the leading battalions of the 167th Brigade, 56th (1/1st London) Division and the division had suffered 2,175 casualties before it was relieved by the 14th (Light) Division on the night of 17/18 August. The 47th (1/2nd London) Division relieved the 8th Division, which had losses of 2,111 men, from the Westhoek–Zonnebeke road to the Ypres–Roulers railway on the night of 18/19 August. The infantry occupied fortified shell holes and some captured pillboxes; German artillery-observers in Polygon Wood and Hollebeke had good observation over the 47th (1/2nd London) Division area and every sign of movement was bombarded. The division edged forwards into the sparsely-garrisoned German outpost line opposite and improved the front line as a jumping-off point for the next attack; the 25th Division took over on 3 September. On 19 August, an intelligence summary estimated that the Germans had 238 guns (88 batteries) between Zandvoorde, Gheluvelt and Zonnebeke.

=== Inverness Copse ===
==== 22–23 August ====
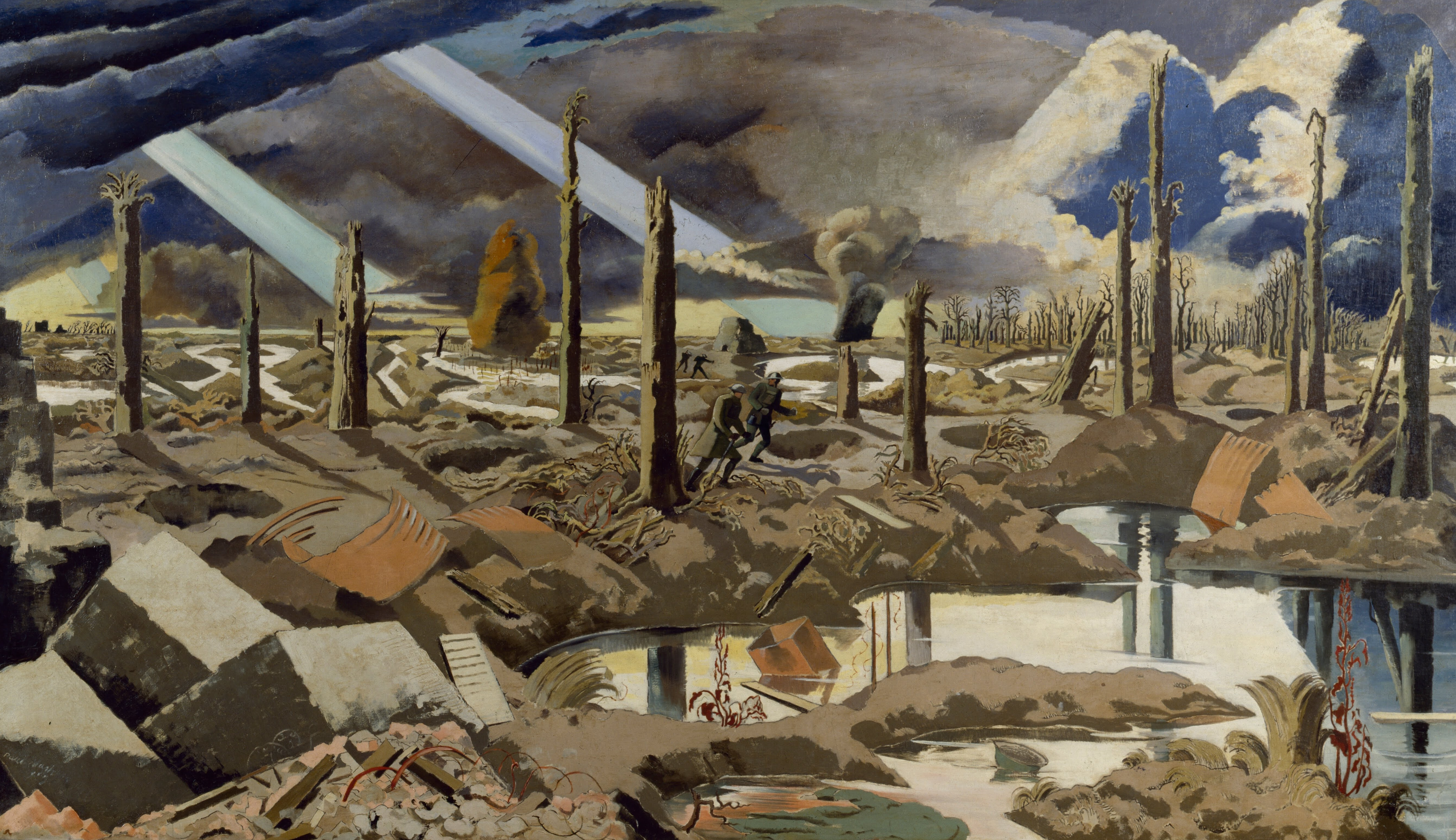
The Menin road (Paul Nash, 1919)

By late August, Inverness Copse on the north side of the Menin road and Herenthage Park to the south, were held by troops of Infantry Regiment 67 in shell-hole positions along the western fringe of the Copse. The Albrechtstellung ran along eastern edge of the Copse but the defences on the west side, about 600 yd (550 m) forward, were a vital outpost line. The defenders were ordered to hold on at all costs because the Albrechtstellung was on the edge of the Gheluvelt Plateau. The capture of the decline to the east would provide the British with valuable observation posts for the next advance. The British attack was intended to capture the Albrechtstellung from Herenthage Park south of the Menin road to Glencorse Wood, with a defensive flank back to the old British front line. The line was to follow the eastern fringe of Inverness Copse north of the Menin road and further on to FitzClarence Farm; on the left (northern) flank, the 42nd Brigade was to capture the blockhouses along the sunken road in Glencorse Wood.

On 18 August, the III Battalion, IR 177 from the 32nd Division, the Eingreif division for Gruppe Wijtschate, had moved forward in support of the 34th Division; two days later IR 103 from the same division had been moved up to Dadizele as the Eingref Regiment. The 43rd Brigade attacked with the 6th Duke of Cornwall's Light Infantry (6th DCLI) on the right and the 6th Somerset Light Infantry (6th SLI) on the left. The 6th SLI got into Inverness Copse with few losses and began a bayonet and hand grenade fight with the 5th Company of II Battalion, IR 67. The Germans were slowly forced back and the 7th and 8th companies were sent forward from the Albrechtstellung as reinforcements. The 7th Company on the left was also forced back by the 6th SLI and around 8:00 a.m. the SLI reached the château south of the Menin road and took 60 prisoners in a 600 yd (550 m) advance. The 5th and 7th companies were almost destroyed but the SLI was down to about 90 men by the time the troops reached the objective. As the 5th Company had been forced back, the left flank of the 6th Company north of the Menin road, was left in the air and the commander covered the gap with machine-guns.

The 6th DCLI was caught within 50 yd (46 m) of its jumping-off line by machine-gun fire from Inverness Copse, forced under cover and lost the barrage. One of four tanks supporting the attack arrived along the Menin road, turned north at the edge of the Copse and engaged the pillboxes pinning down the DCLI, then drove close to a trench along the north edge of the Copse, machine-gunning the German defenders, forcing them out. The 8th Company arrived from the Albrechtstellung but could not stop the tank, despite losing many men rushing it and throwing grenades. The survivors retreated until a field gun was brought up to the south end of Polygon Wood and opened fire, forcing the tank to withdraw. The 6th DCLI was able to use the distraction to move up another 200 yd (180 m) but was still far short of its objective, leaving the 6th SLI isolated.

The HQ of IR 67 in Flandern I Stellung got news of the British attack at 9:15 a.m. from a messenger pigeon and ordered forward I Battalion, IR 67 from the Wilhemstellung to recapture the front line; III Battalion, IR 67 was moved forward from Flandern I Stellung to the Wilhelmstellung in its place. I Battalion found the survivors of II Battalion in the Albrechtstellung and took them forward to counter-attack the 6th SLI, who were too depleted to repulse the attack and fell back to the western edge of the Copse. Reinforced by the 10th Durham Light Infantry, the Somersets managed to hold a line about 250 yd (230 m) south of the Menin road and gained touch with the 6th DCLI to the north. During the afternoon, the two companies of III Battalion, IR 67 in the Albrechtstellung went forward and entered the Copse at about 5:00 p.m., the other two companies took their place and a battalion of IR 177 replaced them in Flandern I Stellung. Orders for another counter-attack were sent from the 34th Division HQ but arrived too late and the attack had to be postponed.

From 2:00 a.m. on 23 August, the rest of III Battalion, IR 67 moved into the Copse and IR 177 moved up from Flandern I Stellung to the Wilhemstellung to take its place, IR 103 taking over in Flandern I Stellung, ready for the attack to begin at 5:05 a.m., after a five-minute hurricane bombardment. The bombardment was not fired and the infantry advanced on time against a determined defence (the 6th SLI and the 6th DCLI had been relieved during the night by the 6th King's Own Yorkshire Light Infantry (6th KOYLI) and the 10th DLI), through which the Germans claimed to have penetrated 200 yd (180 m) to the western edge of the Copse. The German attack coincided with a British attack supported by five tanks crossing no man's land at 4:30 a.m. The tanks were to attack the strong points and the infantry were to follow up but three tanks ditched; the other two arrived at about 6:00 a.m. and turned left and right off the Menin road and drove along the German defences. The German infantry were forced back to their start-line by machine-gun fire from the tanks but after about thirty minutes, German artillery knocked one out; the second tank had engine-trouble and the crew were killed as they dismounted.

The British guns bombarded the Copse during the afternoon and the rest of IR 67 was sent forward from the Wilhelmstellung to the front line. At 10:45 p.m., the 34th Division HQ ordered a methodical attack (Gegenangriff) to be made next morning in Abschnitt Becelaere (Becelaere Sector), to retake the western edge of the Copse and Herenthage Park. During the night, three companies of IR 177 from Flandern I Stellung, a company of IR 30 and the 4th Army Storm Detachment (Sturmabteilung), with seven ten-man platoons of bombers and flamethrowers from Guard Reserve Pioneer Regiment 9, joined IR 67. The 34th Division artillery and that of the neighbouring division were to fire a preliminary bombardment and the advance was to begin at 6:00 a.m. A company with four machine-guns was to be left behind as a rallying point on each side of the Menin road and IR 30 and IR 145 on the flanks were to support the Gegenangriff. After five minutes, the guns were to lift the barrage 300 yd (270 m) and maintain it for an hour to isolate the British from reinforcements; aircraft were to strafe the British front line.

==== 24 August ====
The German hurricane bombardment preceding the Gegenangriff began at 5:30 a.m. fell short of the British along the western fringe of the Copse and hit the German positions instead. It was too late to contact the artillery and the German infantry began the advance at 6:00 a.m. but the 300 yd (270 m) lift by the artillery fell correspondingly short. As the German infantry approached the British positions, they were met by massed small-arms fire but several parties reached the objective, particularly south of the Menin road, as IR 30 attacked southwards from Abschnitt Hooge (Hooge Sector) and dug in. The British counter-attacked at 7:30 a.m. but were held up by the arrival of another company of IR 177. The short shooting by the German artillery continued and at 10:45 a.m. a message was sent back that the infantry would have to retire unless it stopped. The firing continued and the Germans retreated from the western edge of the Copse. The British 43rd Brigade were mixed up and the 9th Rifle Brigade (a battalion), on loan from the 42nd Brigade had also arrived. The British brigade commander wanted to exploit the German retirement but at noon, the commanders at the front reported that they lacked sufficient men to conduct the attack and to hold their positions if it failed.

The Germans were preparing for another attack with II Battalion, IR 177, which had come forward from the Wilhelmstellung by noon. As it moved through the Albrechtstellung, the battalion managed to rally the troops retiring from the Copse and advanced through shrapnel and high explosive shells at 12:45 p.m., forcing back the British to the western fringe of the Copse and beyond by 12:50 p.m. The British repulse led to alarmist reports and the 43rd Brigade HQ requested reinforcements but by 3:00 p.m. news arrived that the German counter-attack had stopped at the western edge of the Copse and Herenthage Park. The panic abated but a counter-attack by two fresh battalions was called off because of the confused state of the front line. During the night, the "shattered" I Battalion IR 177 was relieved by the II Battalion, which had suffered no more than 250 casualties and the survivors of IR 67, which had lost more than 650 casualties in Abschnitt Becelaere were also relieved; III Battalion, IR 102 took over in Abschnitt Gheluvelt with the 34th Division remaining in command; the British 43rd Brigade had suffered more than 1,400 casualties in three days.

=== 25–31 August ===
On 25 August, British artillery blew up an ammunition dump near the blockhouse of the commander of the German support battalion (BTK, Bereitschafts-Truppen-Kommandeur) of the Hooge sector (Abschnitt Hooge). British shelling of the target forced the BTK to abandon the headquarters and the front line battalion commander (KTK, Kampf-Truppen-Kommandeur) did the same before his bunker was destroyed the next day. A general attack by the Fifth Army due on 25 August was cancelled and heavy rain fell during the night of 26/27 August, before a phased attack planned for the next day. The 23rd Division (Major-General James Babington) relieved the 14th (Light) Division on 26 August, except for the 41st Brigade, which came under command. Two battalions of the 70th Brigade were attached to the 41st Brigade and the rest of the 23rd Division went into reserve positions. During the morning the Germans advanced behind a creeping barrage and attacked four outposts with flamethrowers and captured three. (Note: In Lucas and Schmieschek (2015) the German attack is described as failing in such appalling conditions that no more attacks were attempted.) At 4:45 a.m. on 27 August (the corps to the north having attacked at 1:55 p.m.), four tanks were to advance, each with two infantry platoons, to capture 600 yd (550 m) of the trench from the Menin road along Inverness Copse to Glencorse Wood. The tanks ditched close to the front line around Clapham Junction and few of the infantry reached their objectives; those that did were killed or forced to retreat. Next day, the 41st Brigade was replaced by the 70th Brigade; rain and gales led Haig to cancel Fifth Army attacks, except by II Corps on the Gheluvelt Plateau; the weather continued so bad that the next attack on the plateau was called off on 31 August.

== Aftermath ==
=== Analysis ===
==== 31 July ====
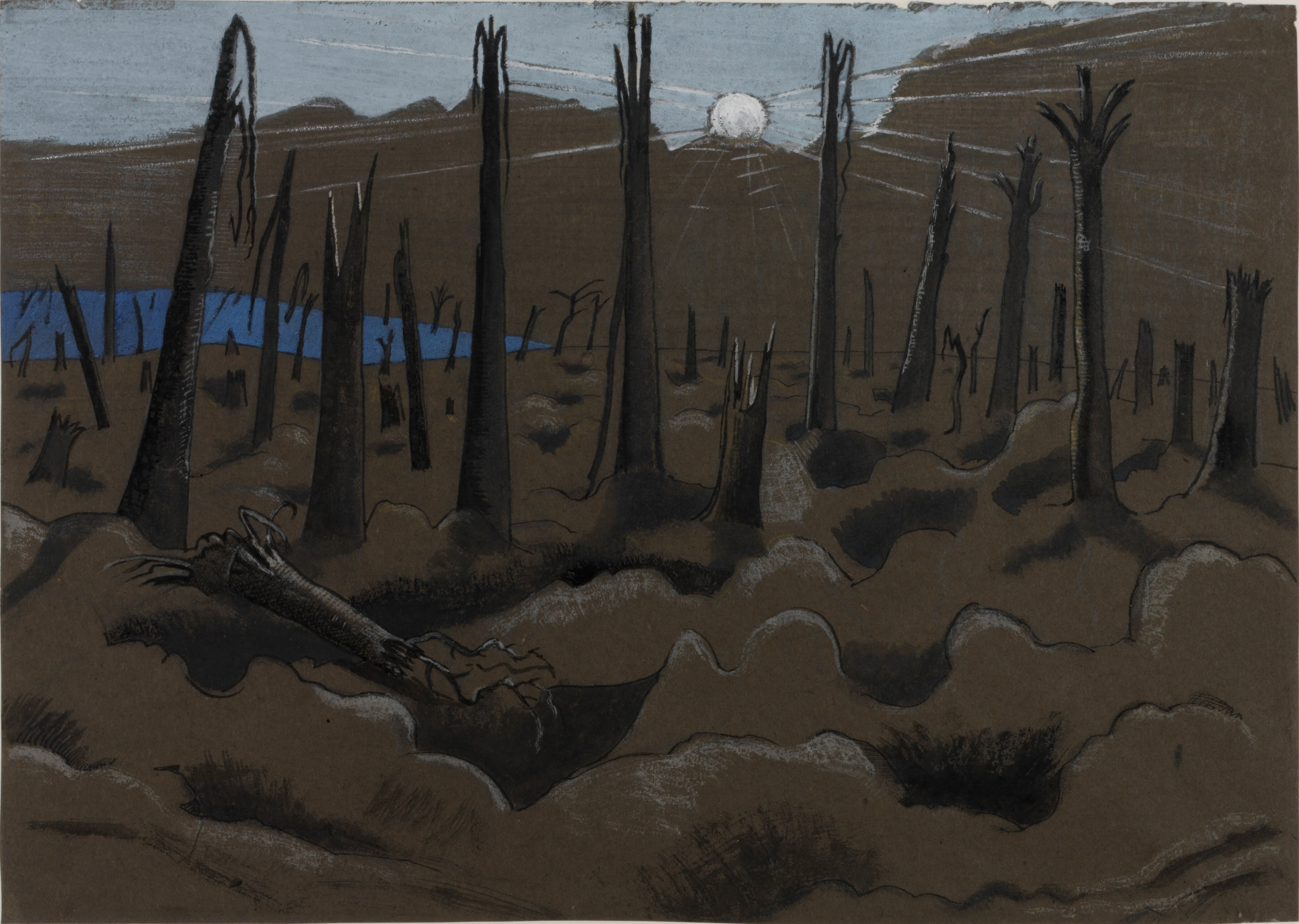
Sunrise, Inverness Copse (Paul Nash, 1917)

In the History of the Great War volume Military Operations France and Belgium 1917, Part II (1948) James Edmonds, the British official historian, described a meeting on 27 June between Haig and Jacob. Haig decided to reinforce II Corps in the Fifth Army by transferring the 24th Division and artillery from X Corps on the northern boundary of the Second Army to the southern boundary of the Fifth Army. Edmonds also described Haig meeting the army commanders the day after on 28 June but the meetings were transposed in the narrative. At the 28 June conference to discuss the memorandum written by Davidson, the Fifth Army plan was endorsed but Edmonds wrote that the emphasis Haig placed on the capture of the Gheluvelt Plateau reflected the GHQ plan, rather than the Fifth Army scheme. In the text, Edmonds wrote that Gough spread the attacking divisions evenly, when he could have reinforced the II Corps with divisions from the corps to the north.

The Fifth Army Operation Order of 27 June was reproduced in Appendix XIII of the official history, showing that the green line (third objective) was the line on which the Fifth Army was to consolidate. The red line determined the furthest extent that exploitation of local opportunities beyond the green line could be undertaken on local initiative. Advance guards of all arms, from the reserve brigades of the attacking divisions or the divisions in corps reserve, were to advance beyond the green line after the protective barrage ended, to reconnoitre and to occupy undefended ground and tactically valuable features up to the red line. The order emphasised that several organised battles on a wide front would be necessary to defeat the Germans and that quick reorganisation would be needed after each attack, contrary to later accounts that described the plan as a breakthrough attempt,

....at no time in these documents did either Gough or Maxse advocate a "hurrooch" as has been said elsewhere.

— Andrew Simpson

In the II Corps area on the Gheluvelt Plateau, the distance to the green line on the right (southern) flank of the 24th Division at Klein Zillibeke, was 1,000 yd (910 m) and 2,500 yd (1.4 mi; 2.3 km) along the left (northern) flank of II Corps along the Ypres–Roulers railway, much shorter distances to the green line than on the corps fronts further north.

In 2007, Jack Sheldon wrote that the daily report of the 4th Army claimed that the Allied attack had been a costly failure, which Sheldon called hyperbole. The attackers had advanced 1.9 mi (3 km) and overrun two defensive positions; heavy artillery had severely bombarded German Eingreifdivisionen moving behind the front line. The German defence was most successful on the Gheluvelt Plateau despite the loss of the observation posts on Bellewaarde Ridge and the Eingreifdivisionen of Gruppe Ypern had not been needed. The defenders had made powerful and determined counter-attacks and the defensive success on the plateau compromised British advances further north, which were vulnerable to enfilade fire by small arms from the plateau and observed artillery-fire. The capture of the Gheluvelt Plateau would have to be a slow process of preparatory bombardments and limited advances. British and French commanders considered the attack to be the first of a series of blows which would lead to an inevitable German collapse and German commanders were concerned at the demands that the battle made on their troops.

==== August ====
The Fifth Army needed to maintain a brisk tempo of attack to benefit from German disorganisation and to create the conditions for Operation Hush on the coast. Hush had to begin during the high tide period at the end of August or it would have to be postponed until the end of September. The Fifth Army had captured ground on the Gheluvelt Plateau on 31 July but the unusually wet and murky weather, the tenacious German defence and determined counter-attacks, left the 4th Army in control of the most vital objectives around Inverness Copse and Glencorse Wood. II Corps attacked the Gheluvelt Plateau on 10, 16, 22 and 27 August. The Germans conducted local counter-attacks (Gegenstöße) with reserve units of the ground-holding divisions and made a bigger, methodical counter-attack (Gegenangriff) on 24 August to recapture Inverness Copse. Haig cancelled a general attack intended for 25 August and altered the Fifth Army–Second Army boundary for the third time. The Second Army took over the II Corps front on the Gheluvelt Plateau in early September and Plumer was allowed three weeks to prepare the next attack.

The II Corps operations on the Gheluvelt Plateau from 31 July to 31 August were conducted by the 24th, 30th, 8th, 25th, 14th, 47th (1/2nd London) and 56th (1/1st London) divisions. From 25 June to 31 August, the II Corps artillery fired more than 2.75 million shells. All of the II Corps divisions suffered many casualties and the torrential rains created exhausting conditions for the infantry. Edmonds wrote in 1948 that the costly failure to capture the plateau in August depressed British morale lower than ever before. The experience among the survivors, recounted in Britain by wounded troops, made a greater impression than the run of victories in September and early October. Edmonds also wrote that the fighting exhausted the divisions of the 4th Army, which was reinforced with divisions and 70 per cent of the heavy artillery ammunition allotment of the French section of the Western Front. The French had been left "unmolested" and the Germans postponed plans for an offensive against the Russians. Edmonds quoted from Ludendorff (My War Memoirs, 1919) that

...the costly August battles imposed a great strain on the Western troops.... The state of affairs in the West appeared to prevent the execution of our plans elsewhere. Our wastage had been so high as to cause grave misgivings, and exceeded all our expectations.

— Ludendorff

In 1996, Robin Prior and Trevor Wilson wrote that changes in Fifth Army infantry tactics had no effect on the lack of accurate artillery firepower necessary to get infantry through the German defences without prohibitive casualties, then keep them there against German artillery-fire and infantry counter-attacks. After the German re-capture of Inverness Copse on 24 August, Haig made the Second Army responsible for the Gheluvelt Plateau, preparatory to a new attack on both sides of the Menin road. The Fifth Army continued with local attacks and by 27 August was worn out. In 2004, John Lee wrote that the weather in August was the worst for 75 years but despite the conditions, Gough continued to order attacks which were inevitably defeated, causing a "severe loss of morale" among the British infantry.

In 2008, J. P. Harris wrote that the August rain fell on both sides but that it benefited the defenders, because it made observation from the air harder, a greater disadvantage to the British and French, who had far more guns than the Germans. Mud stopped movement and the Germans were trying to hold ground, rather than attack like their opponents. The II Corps attack scheduled for 2 August had several postponements, until 10 August, when fresh divisions made a limited objective attack. The ground was still waterlogged, British counter-battery fire failed to suppress the German guns and the attack was a costly failure at the most vital point. By late August, confidence in the handling of the battle by the Fifth Army HQ at GHQ and among the corps and divisional staffs had diminished but intelligence reports continued to be optimistic about the pressure being applied to the Germans. Harris wrote that despite his "endemic optimism", Haig transferred control of the battle for the Gheluvelt Plateau to Plumer but let Fifth Army operations continue in the interim, then ordered them to stop after a series of "bloody failures" that caused a further loss of confidence in Gough.

R. A. Perry wrote in 2014 that by the end of August, thirty German divisions had fought at Ypres, two of them twice and 23 had been exhausted and replaced but that this could be misleading, since at full strength, German divisions had an establishment of 12,000 men, rather than the 20,000, in a British division. The British had used 21 divisions, two twice, of which 14 had been withdrawn. Including the four French divisions of the First Army; 26 Anglo-French divisions with an establishment of 520,000 men had engaged 37 German divisions with an establishment of 440,000 men. Nine of the German divisions had been transferred from Champagne and Alsace-Lorraine, easing the pressure on the French armies. It was conventionally assumed that an attacker needed a 3:1 superiority to prevail but the Fifth Army only had a numerical advantage of about 1.2:1; the British would have needed another 40 divisions sufficiently to outnumber the Germans.

==== Weather ====
In Field Marshal Earl Haig (1929), Brigadier-General John Charteris, the BEF Chief of Intelligence from 1915 to 1918, wrote that

Careful investigation of records of more than eighty years showed that in Flanders the weather broke early each August with the regularity of the Indian monsoon: once the Autumn rains set in difficulties would be greatly enhanced....Unfortunately, there now set in the wettest August for thirty years.

the first part of his sentence was quoted by Lloyd George (1934), Liddell Hart (1934) and Leon Wolff (1959); in a 1997 essay, John Hussey called the passage by Charteris "baffling". The BEF had set up a Meteorological Section under Ernest Gold in 1915, which by the end of 1917 had 16 officers and 82 men. The section predicted the warm weather and thunderstorms of 7 to 14 June and in a letter to the press of 17 January 1958, Gold wrote that the facts of the Flanders climate contradicted the claim made by Charteris in 1929. In 1989, Philip Griffiths examined August weather in Flanders for the thirty years before 1916 and found that,

...there is no reason to suggest that the weather broke early in the month with any regularity.

From 1901 to 1916, records from a weather station at Cap Gris Nez showed that 65 per cent of August days were dry and that from 1913 to 1916, there were 26, 23, 23 and 21 rainless days in August and monthly rainfall of 17, 28, 22 and 96 mm (0.67, 1.10, 0.87 and 3.78 in);

...during the summers preceding the Flanders campaign August days were more often dry than wet.

— Griffith

It was obvious to the Fifth Army HQ planners that moving so many troops, animals, wheeled vehicles, stores and thousands of tons of ammunition, would cut up the ground in the salient. With the experience of August weather since 1914 and study of French records, it was reasonable to hope that the relatively small amount of rain in August would dry quickly and that mud would bake. In August 1917, 127 mm (5.0 in) of rain fell, 84 mm (3.3 in) of it on 1, 8, 14, 26 and 27 August; the weather was also overcast and windless, which much reduced evaporation. Divided into two ten-days' and an eleven-day period, there were 53.6, 32.4 and 41.3 mm (2.11, 1.28 and 1.63 in) of rain in August 1917. In the 61 hours before 6:00 p.m. on 31 July, 12.5 mm (0.49 in) of rain fell and from 6:00 p.m. on 31 July to 6:00 p.m. on 4 August, there were 63 mm (2.5 in) of rain. In August 1917, there were three dry days and 14 days with less than 1 mm (0.039 in) of rain. Three August days were sunless and one had six minutes of sun; over 27 days there were 178.1 hours of sunshine, an average of 6.6 hours per day. Hussey wrote that the weather that August was exceptionally bad; Haig had been justified in his optimism.

==== Supply ====
The approaches to the battlefield as far back as Poperinghe, 10 mi (16 km) to the west, were under continual German artillery-fire and anywhere east of the Ypres–Yser Canal was impassable in daylight. Digging was the only protection from the German artillery and the area became a warren of dugouts and deep tunnels, continuously ventilated and pumped out. After 31 July, the British adapted captured German pillboxes and blockhouses but the weather quickly filled them with fœtid water from the corpses littering the area. The British guns fired more than ten million shells in August [340,000 long tons (350,000 t)] including most of the GHQ ammunition stock which, with the return fire of the German artillery, smashed the surface of the ground. On the Gheluvelt Plateau, the II Corps artillery fired 2,766,824 rounds [85,396 long tons (86,766 t)]. The nine rainy days of August 1917 was average for the month but the quantity of rain that fell was exceptional, flooding the churned ground and causing streams to overflow. Another 54,500 long tons (55,400 t) of ammunition was due to be dumped from the Pacific and Fuzeville railheads by the second week in September but many wagonloads had to be transported to the artillery lines and constant labour by engineers was necessary to maintain plank roads over the mud. After 31 July, loads had to be carried over the Steenbeek and a one-way system was instituted, once the plank roads had been extended about 1,500 yd (1,400 m) closer to the new front line. Duckboards were easy to place, could be moved to avoid shell-fire and quickly repaired.

=== Casualties ===
On 31 July, the 24th Division had 2,242 casualties, the 30th Division 3,365, the 18th Division suffered 954 men killed, wounded or missing and the 8th Division 3,076 casualties. From 31 July to 28 August, British officer casualties were 684 killed, 2,563 wounded and 177 missing, other ranks 9,582 killed, 47,589 wounded and 7,406 missing, a total of 68,010 casualties.

=== Subsequent operations ===
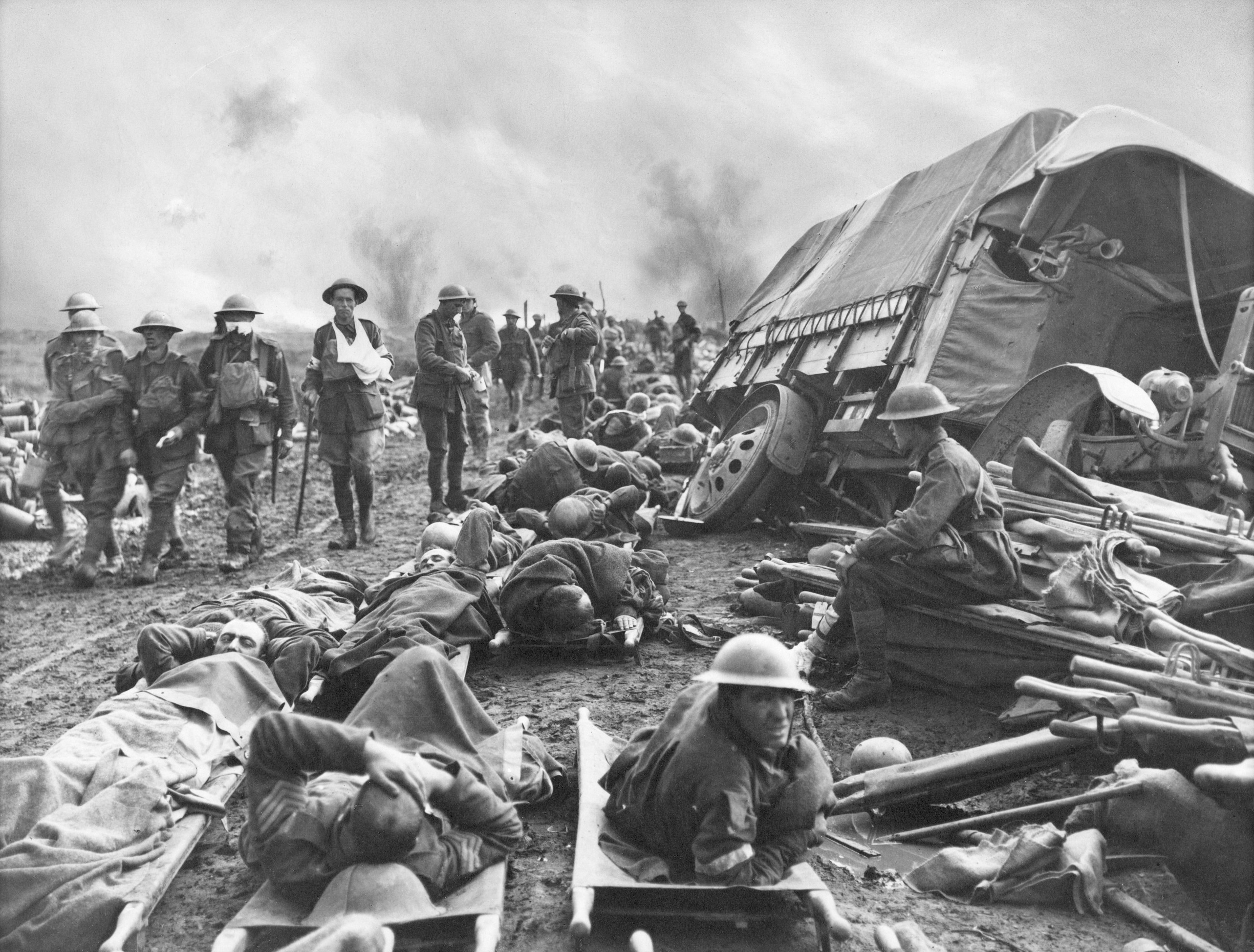
Wounded men at the side of a road after the Battle of Menin road

To force the Germans to disperse their artillery-fire, the Second Army planned to attack on a 6,800 yd (3.9 mi; 6.2 km) front from the Ypres–Comines canal to the Ypres–Roulers railway, with the Fifth Army continuing the attack north to the French First Army boundary. The British plan included more emphasis on the use of heavy and medium artillery to destroy German concrete pill-boxes and machine-gun nests, which were more numerous in the battle zones being attacked and to engage in more counter-battery fire. The Second Army corps on the Gheluvelt Plateau had 575 heavy and medium and 720 field guns and howitzers, more than double the quantity at the Battle of Pilckem Ridge.

Aircraft were to be used for systematic air observation of German troop movements to avoid the failures of previous battles, when too few aircrews had been burdened with too many duties and had often been grounded by bad weather. On 20 September, the British attacked on a 14,500 yd (8.2 mi; 13.3 km) front and captured most of their objectives to a depth of about 1,500 yd (0.85 mi; 1.4 km) by mid-morning. The Germans made many counter-attacks, beginning around 3:00 p.m. which continued until early evening. The counter-attacks failed to gain ground or made only a temporary penetration of the new British positions. The German defence had failed to defeat a well-prepared attack made in good weather.
